= History of the Communist Party of Vietnam =

The Communist Party of Vietnam was known as the Indochinese Communist Party from 1930 to 1951, and the Vietnam Workers' Party from 1951 to 1976, and has since remained the ruling party of the Socialist Republic of Vietnam.

Flag of the Communist Party of Vietnam

== Thanh niên ==
Communism in Vietnam originated in 1925. That year, Nguyễn Sinh Cung, under the pseudonym Nguyễn Ái Quốc but later best known as Hồ Chí Minh, established the Vietnamese Revolutionary Youth League (Vietnamese: Việt Nam Thanh niên Kách mệnh Đồng chí Hội, or "Thanh niên" in short), a communist political organization. Hồ Chí Minh had previously helped found the French Communist Party and had emerged as a leading anti-colonial advocate in the Communist International (Comintern).

Thanh Nien sought to employ patriotism to end the colonial occupation of the country by France as well as traditional Confucianism. The group sought political and social objectives—both national independence and redistribution of land to working peasants.

The establishment of Thanh Niên was preceded by the arrival of Comintern functionary Hồ Chí Minh in Canton, China from Moscow in December 1924. Hồ was ostensibly sent to China to work as a secretary and interpreter to Mikhail Borodin, but he actually set to work almost immediately attempting to transform the existing Vietnamese patriotic movement towards revolutionary ends. Hồ managed to convert a small group of émigré intellectuals called Tâm Tâm xã (Heart-to-Heart Association) to revolutionary socialism and Thanh Niên was born.

The headquarters of the organization in Canton directed the underground revolutionary movement in Vietnam, making all important decisions.

Thanh Nien was designed to prepare for an armed struggle against the French colonial occupation. Hồ Chí Minh and his associates envisioned three phases. In the first phase, an external center was to be established as a training center, source of unified political propaganda and headquarters for strategic decision-making and the maintenance of organizational and ideological discipline. Secret revolutionary groups called "cells" were to be trained in Canton and returned to Vietnam to operate.

In the second phase, activity would become "semi-secret", in which Thanh Niên cadres would initiate political and economic activities, including strike action, boycotts and protests, which might include political violence as a means of mobilizing the masses. A third, insurrection phase, would follow to overthrow the established political regime by force of arms, establishing a new revolutionary government.

Thanh Niên was conceived of as a relatively open mass organization, with the most trusted members part of a directing center called the Communist Youth Corps (CYC). At the time of Thanh Nien's dissolution in 1929, the CYC is believed to have consisted of 24 members. In addition to Thanh Nien, this small inner circle directed two other mass organizations, Nong Hoi ("Peasants' Association") and Cong Hoi ("Workers' Association").

The CYC and Thanh Niên published pamphlets and newspapers, including a guidebook of revolutionary theory and practical techniques called The Road to Revolution, as well as four newspapers—Thanh Niên ("Youth") from June 1925 to May 1930; Bao cong nong ("Worker-Peasant") from December 1926 to early 1928; Linh kach menh ("Revolutionary Soldier") from early 1927 to early 1928; and Viet Nam tien phong ("Vanguard of Vietnam") in 1927.

=== Factional split of 1929 ===
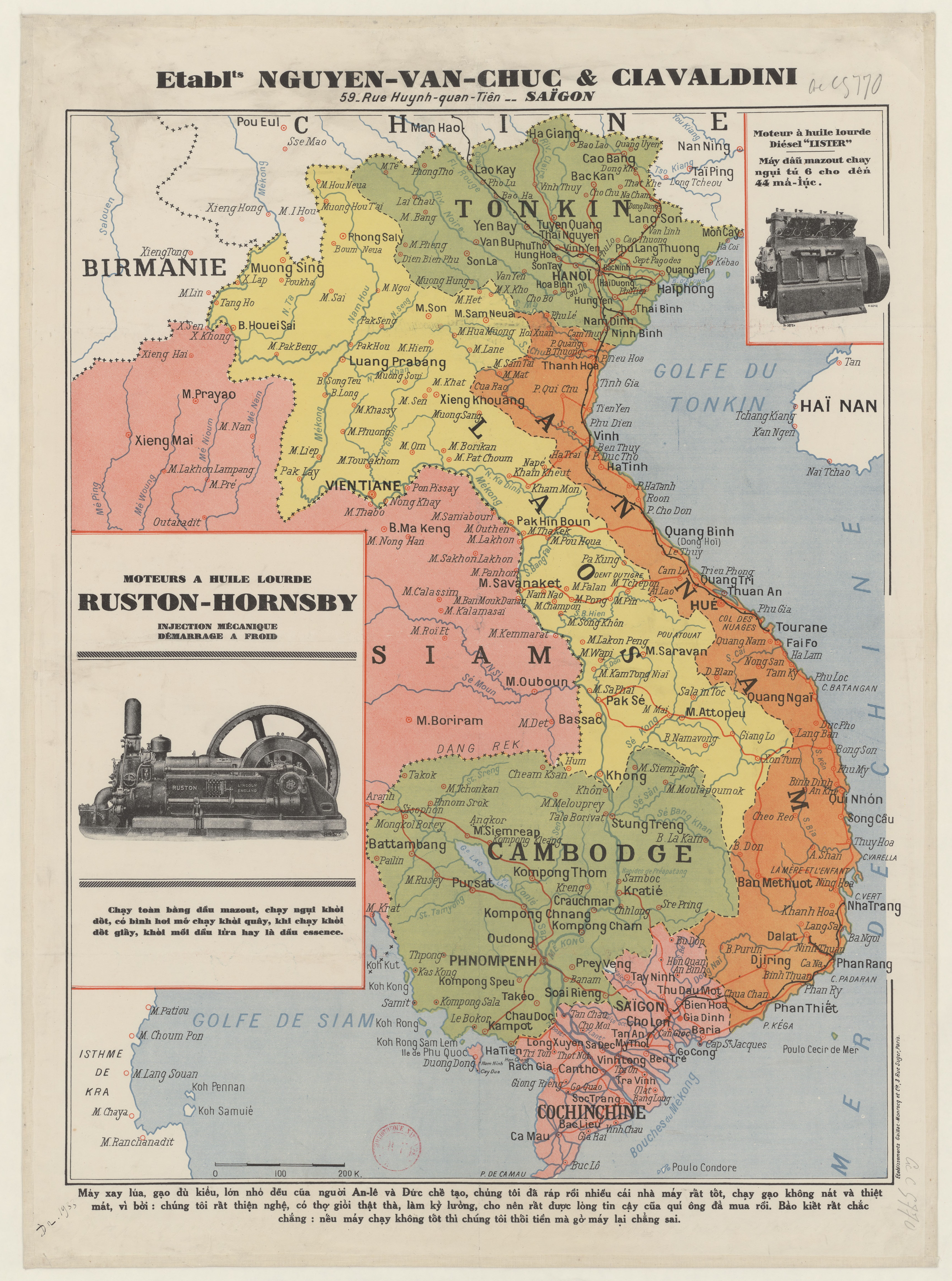
French Indochina map

In 1928 Thanh Niên was forced into hiding by the Chinese Kuomintang (KMT). The center had to be moved repeatedly to avoid repression—first to Wu-Chou and then to Hong Kong. Hồ Chí Minh departed Canton in May 1927 and was incommunicado with the Vietnamese movement. The lack of contacts with a unified headquarters catalyzed an organizational split, with movement radicals beginning to take instructions from the Comintern via the Communist Party of France and others following a different path.

In September 1928 the radical Bac Ky Regional Committee of Thanh Niên held a conference at which it affirmed the Comintern's new Third Period analysis, positing a revolutionary upsurge around the world. Noting the growth of the organization among intellectuals in urban centers, the conference determined to send its largely petty bourgeois membership into the countryside and to urban factories in an attempt to bring communist ideas to the poor peasantry and the numerically tiny working class. In a letter to the Comintern, Thanh Niên estimated that approximately 90 percent of its membership consisted of intellectuals; a full-scale offensive to win mass support was desired.

The Central Committee of Thanh Niên called a National Congress of the organization, slated to begin on May Day of 1929. This gathering, held 1–9 May 1929 and attended by 17 delegates from each of the three main administrative districts of Vietnam, plus Hong Kong and Siam, would prove the occasion for a split between those who placed primary emphasis on the so-called "national question" (independence from colonialism) and those who sought social revolution. Hồ Chí Minh was not in attendance, still missing from the scene. The conclave was chaired by Nguyen Cong Vien, making use of the pseudonym Lam Duc Thu, who summarily ruled the question of formation of a proper Communist party out of order, prompting a walkout of three members of the northern delegation, leaving only an informer working on behalf of the French secret police at the session as the Tonkin representative.

The walkouts were sharply critical of those who refused to split, charging the remaining Thanh Niên leaders as "false revolutionaries" and "petit-bourgeois intellectuals" who were attempting to build bridges with the "anti-revolutionary and anti-worker" Kuomintang. On 17 June more than 20 delegates from cells throughout the Tonkin region held a conference in Hanoi, where they declared the dissolution of Thanh Niên and the establishment of a new organization called the Communist Party of Indochina (ICP).

The new Northern party published pamphlets detailing its rules based upon the Comintern's "Model Statutes for a Communist Party" as well as the International program approved by the Sixth World Congress of the Comintern in 1928. Three periodicals were launched—the newspaper Cờ đỏ ("Red Flag"), the theoretical journal Búa liềm ("Hammer and Sickle") and the trade union publication Công hoi đỏ ("Red Trade Union").

The other faction, based in the central and southern administrative districts of the country, named itself the Communist Party of Annam in the fall. The two organizations spent the rest of 1929 engaged in a polemical battle in an attempt to gain hegemony over the movement.

A third Vietnamese communist party emerged around this time, unconnected with Thanh Niên, called the League of Indochinese Communists (Vietnamese: Đông Dương Cộng sản Liên Đoàn). This group had its roots in another national liberation group which had existed as a rival to Thanh Niên.

== Indo-Chinese Communist Party ==
=== Comintern critique ===
The two warring offspring of Thanh Niên joined with individual members of a third Marxist group founded by Phan Bội Châu at a "Unification Conference" held in Hong Kong from 3–7 February 1930. Hồ Chí Minh became active again and was responsible for brokering the peace, as well as writing the initial manifesto and statement of tactics of the group. The new party was named the Communist Party of Vietnam (CPV), but did not long retain this title.

The Hong Kong conference (held in Kowloon City) elected a nine-member Provisional Central Committee consisting of three members from Tonkin in the North, two from the central region of Annam, two from the southern district Cochinchina and two from the émigré Vietnamese community in China. The latter group had previously been organized within the South Seas Communist Party.

The Comintern was sharply critical of the way in which the organization was unified, decrying the Vietnamese's party's failure to eliminate so-called "heterogeneous elements". The organization's declared emphasis upon national liberation under the slogan "An Independent Viet Nam" was criticized as a manifestation of nationalism, while the party's emphasis on its role in the international communist movement was deemed insufficient. A new conference was demanded, labeled the "First Plenum of the Central Committee." The session was held in Hong Kong in October 1930 and renamed the organization the Indochinese Communist Party (Vietnamese: Đông Dương Cộng sản Đảng) (ICP) to mark Comintern's imposed changes.

At the time it formally came into being, the ICP could claim to be a vanguard of only a small working class – a mere 221,000 people in a country of 17 million. Even of this minority, most were far removed from modern industry, with one-third of these employed in various capacities on rubber plantations and the like. The working class in the North was semi-peasant in nature, leaving work in the mines and factories for the Tết festival that marked the start of the new year, often not returning. Working conditions were poor and labor turnover high.

During its first five years ICP membership reached about 1500, plus a large additional contingent of sympathizers. Despite the group's small size, it exerted influence in a turbulent Vietnamese social climate. Back-to-back bad harvests in 1929 and 1930 combined with an onerous debt burden served to radicalize many peasants. In the industrial city of Vinh, May Day demonstrations were organized by ICP activists, which gained critical mass when families of semi-peasant workers joined demonstrations as a means of venting their dissatisfaction.

=== Suppression and restoration ===
As three May Day marches grew into mass rallies, French colonial authorities moved to squelch what they perceived to be dangerous peasant revolts. Government forces fired upon the assembled crowd, killing dozens of participants and inflaming the population. In response local councils sprung up in various villages in an effort to govern themselves as the revolt spread. Repression began in the fall, with some 1,300 eventually killed by the French and many times more imprisoned or deported. General Secretary Trần Phú and many leaders of the Central Committee were arrested and killed. While the ICP was effectively wiped out in the region, popular memory lived on. Lê Hồng Phong was assigned from the Comintern to restore the movement.

The First National Party Congress was held in secret in Macau in 1935. At the same time, a Comintern Congress in Moscow adopted a policy towards a popular front against Fascism and directed Communist movements around the world to collaborate with anti-fascist forces regardless of their orientation towards socialism. This required the ICP to regard all nationalist parties in Indochina as potential allies. Hà Huy Tập was appointed General Secretary (instead of Lê Hồng Phong).

=== Left Opposition and the Popular Front ===
The support the party accorded to the new Popular Front government in France contributed to a unique instance of cooperation between leading party cadres and left-oppositionists. In July 1930, declaring that, "being at all times a reactionary ideology, nationalism cannot succeed but to forge a new chain for the working class", party dissidents in France had formed an Indochinese Group within the Communist League [Liên Minh Cộng Sản Đoàn/Groupe indochinois de la Ligue Communiste (Opposition)], the French section of Trotsky's International Left Opposition. Deported back to Cochinchina, the oppositionists split. Hồ Hữu Tường, once considered "the theoretician of the Vietnamese contingent in Moscow," formed the October Left Opposition (Ta Doi Lap Thang Moui) and called for a new "mass-based" party.

Reacting to the severe repression of 1930-32 that had shattered and disorganised all anti-colonial political groupings, the local ICP party leader Nguyễn Văn Tạo found others, around Tạ Thu Thâu, willing to cooperate in a common program. On the basis of a mutual political armistice they produced the newspaper La Lutte (The Struggle) and presented a common workers' slate in Saigon municipal, and Cochinchina Colonial Council, elections.

The Lutteurs entered their own Popular Front, the Indo-Chinese Congress Movement (Phong-tiao-Dong-duong-Dai-hoi) with the bourgeois Constitutionalist Party, in order to draw up demands relating to the political, economic and social reforms that were to be presented to the new government in Paris. But militants continued to be arrested, and the Congress movement was suppressed. Pressured under the lengthening shadow of the Moscow Trials to denounce their Trotskyite collaborators as "the twin brothers of fascism", Nguyễn Văn Tạo and his comrades rejected a motion by Thâu attacking the Popular Front for betraying the promises of reform in the colonies and in June 1937 they withdrew from La Lutte.

In April 1939, burdened by the colonial defence levy that, in the spirit of Franco-Soviet accord, they had felt obliged to support, the party's Democratic Front lost out to Thâu's "United Workers and Peasants" slate in elections to the colonial Cochinchina Council. Governor-General Brévié, who set the results aside, wrote to Colonial Minister Georges Mandel: "the Trotskyists under the leadership of Ta Thu Thau, want to take advantage of a possible war in order to win total liberation." The Stalinists, on the other hand, are "following the position of the Communist Party in France" and "will thus be loyal if war breaks out".

The Hitler-Stalin Pact of August 23, 1939 intervened, and Moscow ordered a return to direct confrontation with the French. The party obliged, triggering early in 1940 a peasant revolt in the Mekong Delta late in 1940. Following the rising's brutal suppression, the French executed Hà Huy Tập and several other leading cadres.

=== World War II ===
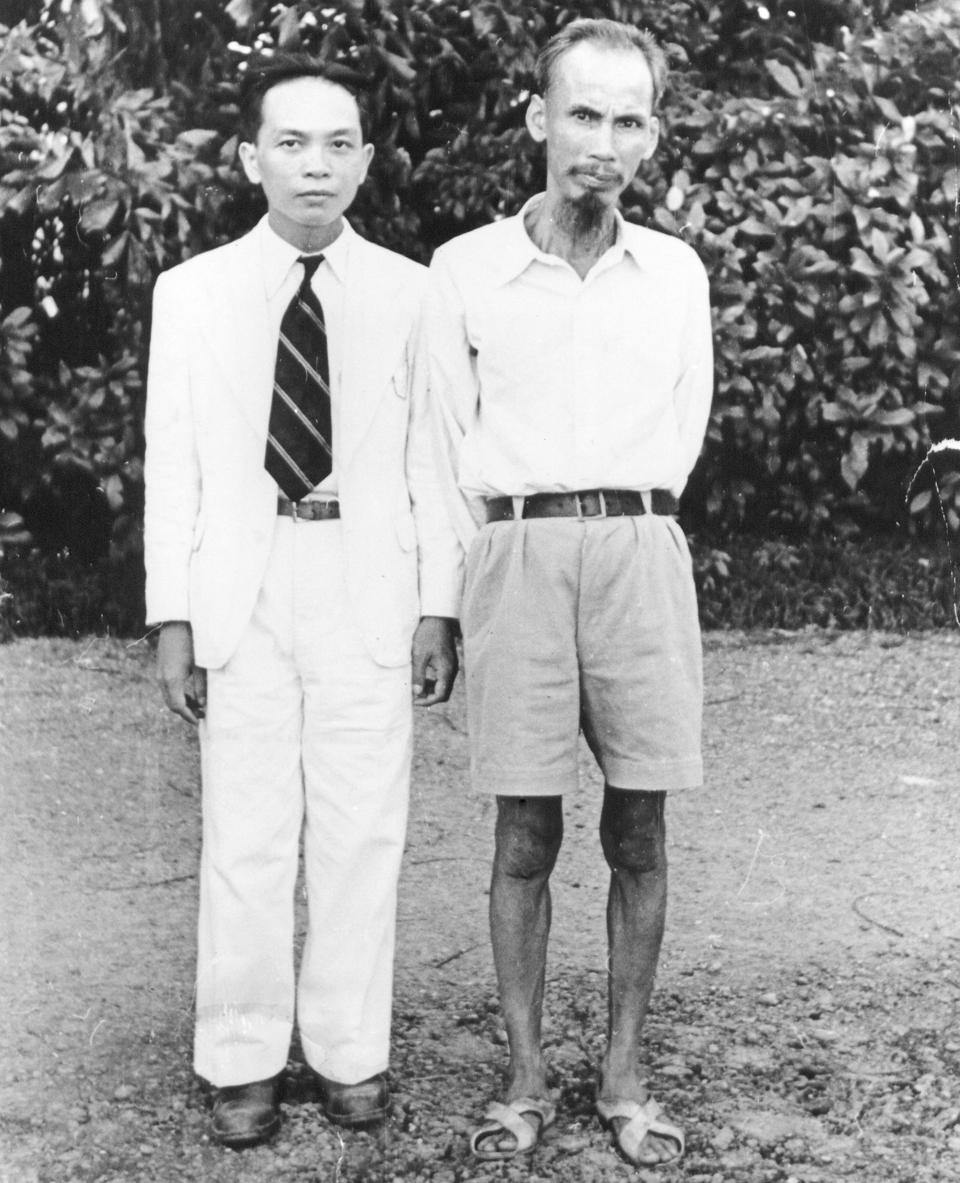
Võ Nguyên Giáp (left) and Hồ Chí Minh in Hà Nội, October 1945

The Second World War drastically weakened France's grasp on Indochina. The fall of France to Nazi Germany in May 1940 and Vichy France's subsequent collaboration with the Axis powers, and Imperial Japan in particular, served to delegitimize French claims to ownership. Preoccupation with the European war made colonial governance from France impossible and the country was occupied by the Empire of Japan.

The ICP instructed its members to move to rural areas and to go into hiding as an underground organization. Despite this preventive measure, more than 2,000 party members were imprisoned, including many key leaders. Party activists were particularly hard hit in the southern region of Cochinchina, where the previously strong organization was wiped out by arrests and killings. After an uprising in Cochinchina in 1940, most of the Central Committee leaders were arrested, killed, including Nguyễn Văn Cừ (General Secretary), Hà Huy Tập; and Lê Hồng Phong was deported to Côn Đảo and died later.

Following the elimination of the old leadership, a new group emerged, including Trường Chinh, Phạm Văn Đồng and Võ Nguyên Giáp—individuals who together with Hồ Chí Minh would provide a unified leadership, notwithstanding recurrent factional disputes, over the ensuing decades.

Hồ Chí Minh returned to Vietnam in February 1941 and established a military organization known as the League for the Independence of Vietnam (Vietnamese: Việt Nam Độc Lập Đồng Minh Hội, commonly "Viet Minh"). The Viet Minh originally downplayed their social objectives, painting themselves as a patriotic organization battling for national independence to garner maximum public support against the Japanese military occupation. As the most uncompromising force fighting the occupation, the Viet Minh gained popular recognition and legitimacy in what would develop into a political vacuum.

With his organization underarmed and its bases isolated, Hồ traveled to China in August 1942 seeking Allied military aid. Ho was arrested by the Nationalist government and subjected to 14 months of brutal imprisonment, followed by another year of restricted movement. Hồ was unable to return to Vietnam until September 1944. The Communist Party and its Viet Minh offshoot managed to prosper without him. Despite its position as the core of the Viet Minh organization, the Indochinese Communist Party remained very small through the war years, with an estimated membership of 2–3,000 in 1944.

The ICP launched an uprising in 1945, the August Revolution, that freed Le Duan and other party faithful. This was accompanied by attacks upon rival political formations, including the nationalist VNQDĐ, the syncretic Hoa Hao and Cao Dai sects, and the Trotskyists—the Socialist Workers Party in the north (Dang Tho Thuyen Xa Hoi Viet Bac) and the Fourth Internationalists in the south (Trăng Câu Đệ Tứ Đảng)--and the execution of their leading cadres.

=== Dissolution and reformation as CPV ===
The ICP formally dissolved in 1945 to hide its Communist affiliation and its activities were folded into the Marxism Research Association and the Viet Minh. Its remnants functioned as the core of the Viet Minh. The Central Intelligence Agency estimated that membership grew over from 50,000 members in 1946 to 400,000 members in 1950.

The party was re-founded as the Workers' Party of Vietnam (Đảng lao động Việt Nam) at the 2nd Congress in Tuyên Quang in 1951. The Congress decided to split into three parties, one each for Vietnam, Laos and Cambodia. At the time the party had 766,349 members.

The Third National Congress, held in Hanoi in 1960, formalized the tasks of constructing socialism in what was by then North Vietnam and committed the party to liberation in the South. The party had some 500,000 members (both north and south). At the 4th Congress in 1976, the Workers' Party of North Vietnam merged with the People's Revolutionary Party of South Vietnam to form the Communist Party of Vietnam. At the time, the party had 1,550,000 members.

=== Collective leadership and internal divisions ===
Following the 1954 Geneva Accords, which indirectly split Vietnam into North and South, the party had been split by factional rivalry between party boss Trường Chinh and President Hồ, focusing on the issue of land reform in the North. Lê Duẩn had remained neutral in this dispute, allowing him to rise through the Party ranks, beginning as the First Secretary, the head of the Communist Party, in late 1956.

He acquired more influence by installing his supporters, notably Lê Ðức Thọ, in top positions, then took on responsibility for planning the offensive in the south, while his main rival within the party, Trường Chinh, concerned himself primarily with the socialist transformation of the north. Lê Duẩn became the de facto leader of the Party even though Hồ remained its chairman and continued to influence North Vietnam's governance.

In 1964, Hồ's health began to fail and Lê Duẩn, as his trusted underling, more visibly took on day-to-day decision-making responsibilities. When Hồ died on 2 September 1969, the collective leadership he had espoused continued, but Lê Duẩn was first among equals.

== Ruling party (1976–present) ==
On 2 July 1976, South Vietnam and North Vietnam were reunified to form the Socialist Republic of Vietnam. The CPV retained its power.

=== 4th Congress (1976–1982) ===
The 4th Congress consisted of 1,008 delegates. A new policy for socialist construction was approved, the Second Five-Year Plan (1976–80) was approved and several amendments were made to the party constitution. The new approach emphasized building socialism domestically, while at the same time supporting socialist expansion abroad. The party's economic goal at the time was to build a strong and prosperous socialist country over 20 years by skipping the stage of capitalist development.

The Second Five-Year Plan failed utterly and during the period between the 4th and 5th Party Congresses, heated debate about economic policy took place. The first was at the 6th Central Committee plenum of the 4th Congress in September 1979, but the most revealing discussion occurred at the 10th Central Committee plenum of the 4th Congress that lasted from 9 October to 3 November 1981. The plenum adopted a reformist line, but it was forced to moderate its position when several grass-root chapters objected.

=== 5th Congress (1982–1986) ===
At the 5th National Congress, held in March 1982, General Secretary Lê Duẩn said the party had to reach two goals; the first was to construct socialism and the second was to protect Vietnam from Chinese aggression, giving priority to socialist construction. The party leadership acknowledged the failure of the Second Five-Year Plan, claiming that it was their failure to grasp the economic and social conditions which aggravated the country's economic problems. The Third Five-Year Plan (1981–85) emphasized the need to improve living conditions and the need for more industrial investment, but agriculture was given top priority. Other points were to improve planning, trade relations with COMECON, the Lao People's Democratic Republic and the People's Republic of Kampuchea.

On the days that our party was fighting for power, it depended on the people for support. Now, the possession of power is likely to lead to alienation from the masses, arrogance and high-handedness, greed and embezzlement, bureaucratism and authoritarianism in economic and ideological leadership. All this must be strongly criticised and condemned.

— Nguyễn Văn Linh in a press conference where he talked about the need to relax state censorship and allow more freedom of expression in general.

While Lê Duẩn continued to believe in the Third Five-Year Plan, leading members within the Communist Party were losing their trust in the system. It was in this mood in 1985 that market prices were introduced. This led to a period of inflation that reached over 100%. The Third Five-Year Plan also failed. Lê Duẩn died on 10 July 1986, months short of the 6th Party Congress. A Politburo meeting held 25–30 August 1986 paved the way for more radical reforms. In an ironic twist, the new reform movement was led by the former Maoist-Stalinist hardliner Trường Chinh.

=== 6th Congress (1986–1991) ===
At the 6th Congress, Nguyễn Văn Linh was elected General Secretary – a victory for the party's old guard reformers. The new leadership would later launch Đổi Mới and establish the framework for a socialist-oriented market economy. The economic reforms were initiated alongside a relaxation of state censorship and increased freedom of expression.

The fall of communism in the Eastern Bloc and the dissolution of the Soviet Union in 1991 led the Vietnamese leadership to distinguish between economic and political reform – believing the former led to the fall of communism in Eastern Europe. Despite vague references to "imperialist and reactionary forces", the party asserted that the changes in Europe were because of its lack of reform, or the unsuccessful implementation of reform. The Draft Platform for the Building of Socialism in the Transition Period was created at the Central Committee meeting of 17–26 November 1990, to prepare for the upcoming 7th Congress. It declared that socialism, "regardless of the tortuous path ahead", was the right path and the communist movement would be revitalized in the face of capitalism's own contradictions.

=== 7th Congress (1991–1996) ===
At the 7th Party Congress, Nguyễn Văn Linh retired from active politics. He reaffirmed Vietnam's commitment to socialism. Đỗ Mười, a conservative, succeeded Nguyễn Văn Linh as General Secretary, Võ Văn Kiệt, the leading communist reformer, was appointed prime minister and Lê Đức Anh, a conservative communist, was appointed president.

In the aftermath of the 7th Party Congress, the conservatives tried to retake control of the Party. In 1994, four new members were appointed to the 7th Politburo, all of whom opposed more radical reform. Despite conservative maneuvering, the reform proved highly successful and economic growth between the 7th and 8th Party Congress averaged 8 percent. While the growth figures were impressive, sustaining growth run required ongoing reforms – however, such reforms, it was believed, would lead to instability and maybe even threaten the Communist Party's hold on power. The conservatives opposed change for that reason, while the reformers held that change was the only way to develop the economy. The Asian financial crisis of the late-1990s shrank growth to 2 percent annually.

Before 1991, there was significantly greater concentration of power in the General Secretary. After the revised constitution was adopted in 1992, power was more distributed between the General Secretary, the President, and the Prime Minister.

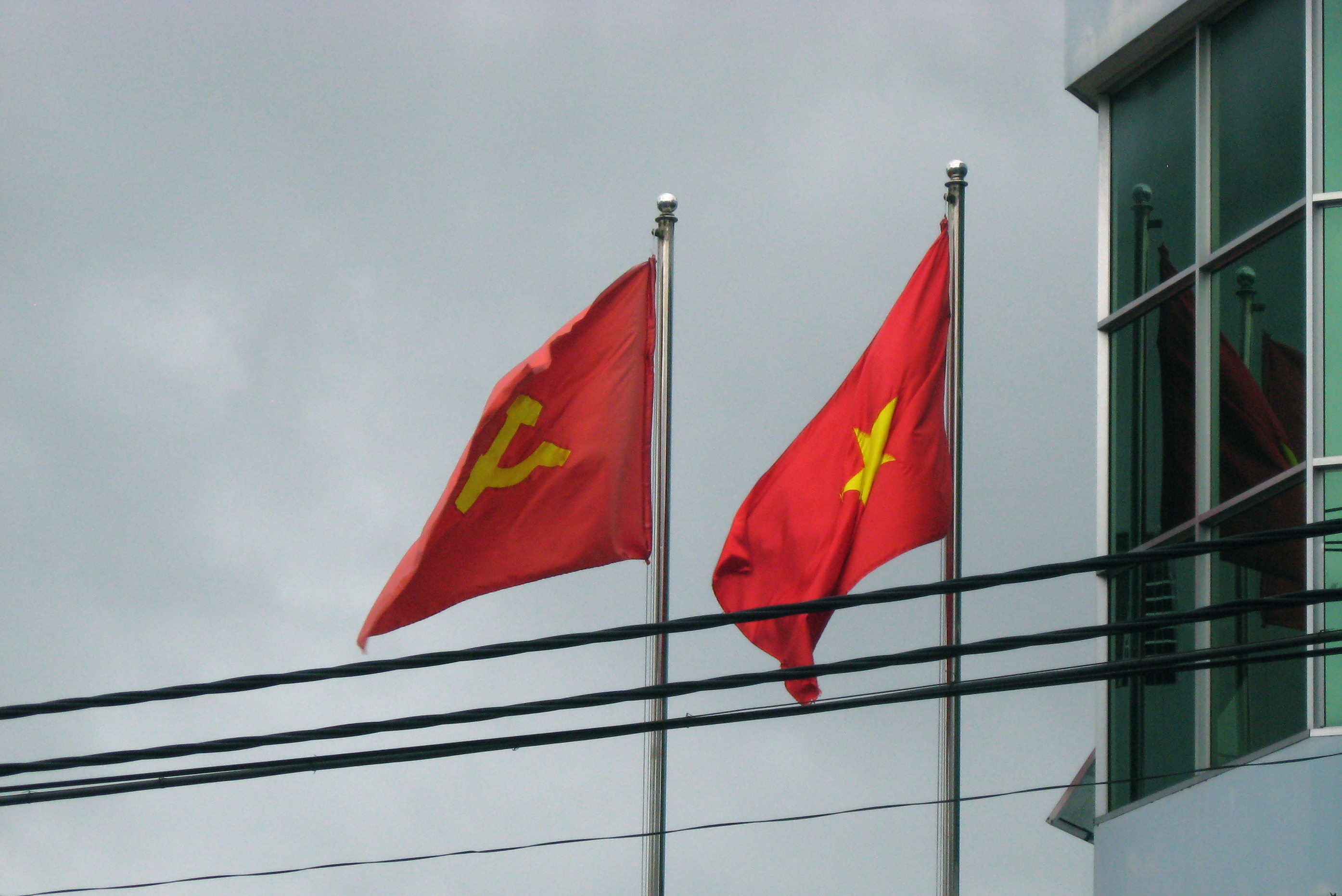
Two flags—the flag of the Communist Party and the national flag of Vietnam—flying side by side.

==== Infighting ====
Factional infighting broke out between the 7th and 8th Party Congresses, crippling the country's leadership. While reformers led by Võ Văn Kiệt wanted to open Vietnam to the global economy via a neo-liberal approach – which meant a total break with Leninist economics – conservatives wanted Vietnam's state-owned enterprises to dominate and pointed to the success of Four Asia Tigers. The party that had worked via consensus was breaking apart rapidly.

In a 1995 letter to the Politburo, which was later leaked to the press, Võ Văn Kiệt wrote "in order to mobilize the genius of all within party, there must be uncompromising democracy." He lambasted the conservatives, claiming that the state-owned sector had to shrink in favor of the private sector and that Vietnam had to forsake its relations with the remaining socialist states. He advised the party to stop meddling in government affairs and put national interest above government affairs. In response, conservatives sent Nguyễn Hà Phan around the country to criticise Võ Văn Kiệt, who he claimed was deviating from socialism. As the power struggle continued, Chief of Staff Đào Đình Luyện was demoted for his support of the reformist line and Nguyễn Hà Phan was demoted from the Politburo and put under house arrest on charges of treason in April 1996.

During these hard times, conservatives launched a campaign led by Đào Duy Tùng, the editor-in-chief of Communist Review (Vietnamese: Tạp chí Cộng Sản). Thanks to his support within the party, Đào Duy Tùng attained unprecedented control over personnel appointment and the drafting of the Political Report to the 8th Party Congress. However, at the 10th Central Committee meeting of the 7th Party Congress, he was accused of "anti-democratic behaviour" and abuse of power and because of it, he was not reelected to the Politburo, attaining only 10 percent of the vote.

=== 8th Congress (1996–2001) ===
The fall of Đào Duy Tùng, Đỗ Mười's planned successor, led to a compromise solution where the general secretary, prime minister and president were reelected at the 8th Party Congress because of the lack of a majority driven by the conservative – reformist power struggle. However, a significant turnover within the party leadership occurred and for the first time in years, the central leadership lost ground to the provincial party branches and government bureaucrats – only 8.9 percent of the new Central Committee members came from the central party apparatus, while 67 percent of the new members had either an immediate provincial background or a government background.

The first sign of the future transition came when President Lê Đức Anh suffered a stroke in 1996. With a leading conservative incapacitated, reformers led by Võ Văn Kiệt launched an unsuccessful campaign for power. At the June 1997 Central Committee meeting, both Lê Đức Anh and Võ Văn Kiệt confirmed their resignation to the 9th National Assembly, the assembly would be dissolved in September 1997. Đỗ Mười, it seems, tried to hold on to his post until 2001. Phan Văn Khải was approved as Võ Văn Kiệt's successor and the relatively unknown Trần Đức Lương succeeded Lê Đức Anh as president because of conservative infighting. At the 4th Central Committee plenum of the 8th Congress, Lê Khả Phiêu, a conservative military man, was elected General Secretary with backing from the reformers – again, the conservatives were troubled by infighting and they had trouble choosing a candidate for the post of General Secretary; they went through Đoàn Khuê, Nông Đức Mạnh, Nguyễn Đức Bình, Nguyễn Thị Xuân Mỹ, Lê Minh Hương, Lê Xuân Tùng and Phạm Thế Duyệt until they settled for Nguyễn Văn An, but by then it was too late.

==== Lê Khả Phiêu ====
Unlike his predecessors, Lê Khả Phiêu represented a compromise among the factions. Because of this, Lê Khả Phiêu entered his secretaryship with a handicap. Another problem facing him was his lack of a patronage network. He had previously worked as the Head of the General Political Department, but he was unpopular among several of his military colleagues. The Asian financial crisis and the power struggle within the party crippled efficient administration, presenting Lê Khả Phiêu with a daunting task. While the conservatives believed Vietnam could weather the storm, the reformers believed Vietnam could revitalise its economy by introducing a radical reform package. The conservatives blamed the crisis on the deficiencies of capitalism and believed Vietnam's lack of integration with the global economy was a blessing, while the reformers blamed "crony capitalism", which occurred because of imperfect markets and government intervention.

Lê Khả Phiêu took a subdued approach, weighing in only at the ends of discussions, instead of leading them. The devolution of authority from the Central Committee had increased rapidly since the 6th Party Congress. Provincial-level officials first felt the pinch of the economic crisis and were the most eager to launch reforms. This led to Lê Khả Phiêu's downfall in 2001. While he was able to persuade the Politburo to keep him as general secretary (a two-thirds majority voted in favor of retaining him), the 12th Central Committee plenum of the 8th Party Congress overturned the Politburo's decision and ousted him. Nông Đức Mạnh succeeded Lê Khả Phiêu in 2001 as general secretary in the immediate aftermath of the 9th Party Congress.

=== Since 2001 ===
Nông Đức Mạnh held the top spot until the 11th National Congress in 2011, when he was succeeded by Nguyễn Phú Trọng. Trong is seen as a conservative and closer to China. In 2021, General Secretary of the Communist Party, Nguyen Phu Trong, was re-elected for his third term in office, meaning he is Vietnam's most powerful leader in decades.

== Bibliography ==
- Abuza, Zachary (16 November 2001). "The Lessons of Le Kha Phieu: Changing Rules in Vietnamese politics". Vietnamese Professionals of America. Catholic University of America.
- Ang, Cheng Guan (1997). Vietnamese Communists' Relations with China and the Second Indochina Conflict, 1956–1962. McFarland & Company. ISBN 9780786404049.
- Ashwill, Mark; Thai, Ngoc Diep (2005). Vietnam Today: A Guide to a Nation at a Crossroads. Intercultural Press. ISBN 9781931930093.
- Brocheux, Pierre (2007). Ho Chi Minh: a Biography. Cambridge University Press. ISBN 9780521850629.
- Corfield, Justin (2008). The History of Vietnam. ABC-CLIO. ISBN 9780313341946.
- East, Roger; Thomas, Richard (2003). Profiles of People in Power: The World's Government Leaders. Routledge. ISBN 9781857431261.
- Gillespie, John Stanley (2006). Transplanting Commercial Law Reform: Developing a 'Rule of Law' in Vietnam. Ashgate Publishing. ISBN 9780754647041.
- Huỳnh Kim Khánh (1982). Vietnamese Communism, 1925–1945. Cornell University Press. ISBN 978-0-8014-1369-8.
- Jeffries, Ian (1993). Socialist Economies and the Transition of the Market: A Guide. Routledge. ISBN 9780415075800.
- Kolko, Gabriel (1994). Anatomy of a War: Vietnam, the United States and the Modern Historical Experience. New Press. ISBN 9781565842182.
- Largo; et al. (2002). Vietnam: Current Issues and Historical Background. Nova Publishers. ISBN 978-1590333686.
- Porter, Gareth (1993). Vietnam: The Politics of Bureaucratic Socialism. Cornell University Press. ISBN 9780801421686.
- Quinn-Judge, Sophie (2002). Ho Chi Minh: The Missing Years, 1919–1941. University of California Press. ISBN 9780520235335.
- Rowley, Chris (2008). The Changing Face of Management in South East Asia. Taylor & Francis. ISBN 9780415405447.
- Smith, R. B. (October 1998). "The Foundation of the Indochinese Communist Party, 1929–1930". Modern Asian Studies. 32 (4): 769–805. doi:10.1017/s0026749x98002923. S2CID 145317771.
- Van, Canh Nguyen; Cooper, Earle (1983). Vietnam under Communism, 1975–1982. Hoover Press. ISBN 9780817978518.
- Võ, Nhân Trí (1990). Vietnam's Economic Policy since 1975. Institute of Southeast Asian Studies. ISBN 9789813035546.
