= Communism in Vietnam =

Communism in Vietnam is closely associated with the country's modern history and politics. Marxism–Leninism was first introduced into Vietnam in the 1920s. In 1930, the anti-colonial revolutionary Hồ Chí Minh, acting under the direction of the Comintern, coordinated the unification of three competing communist organizations in Hong Kong, establishing the Communist Party of Vietnam (soon renamed to the Indochinese Communist Party). Trần Phú served as its first Secretary General. There were also influential Trotskyists in Vietnam until their suppression by the ICP.

Both repressed by the French colonial authorities, republicans were far more popular than communists in the competition between the two groups for leadership of the national independence movement. Following the end of the Japanese occupation and the August Revolution in 1945, the ICP-led Việt Minh declared the independence of the Democratic Republic of Vietnam (DRV). The party subsequently led the DRV through the First Indochina War against the French Union (1946–1954) and the Vietnam War against South Vietnam and the United States (1955–1975), which ended with national reunification in 1976.

Since the introduction of the Đổi Mới (Renovation) economic reforms in 1986, the CPV has officially guided Vietnam under the framework of a "Socialist-Oriented Market Economy," integrating market mechanisms and foreign investment while retaining state control over core sectors, financial institutions, and political governance.

== History ==
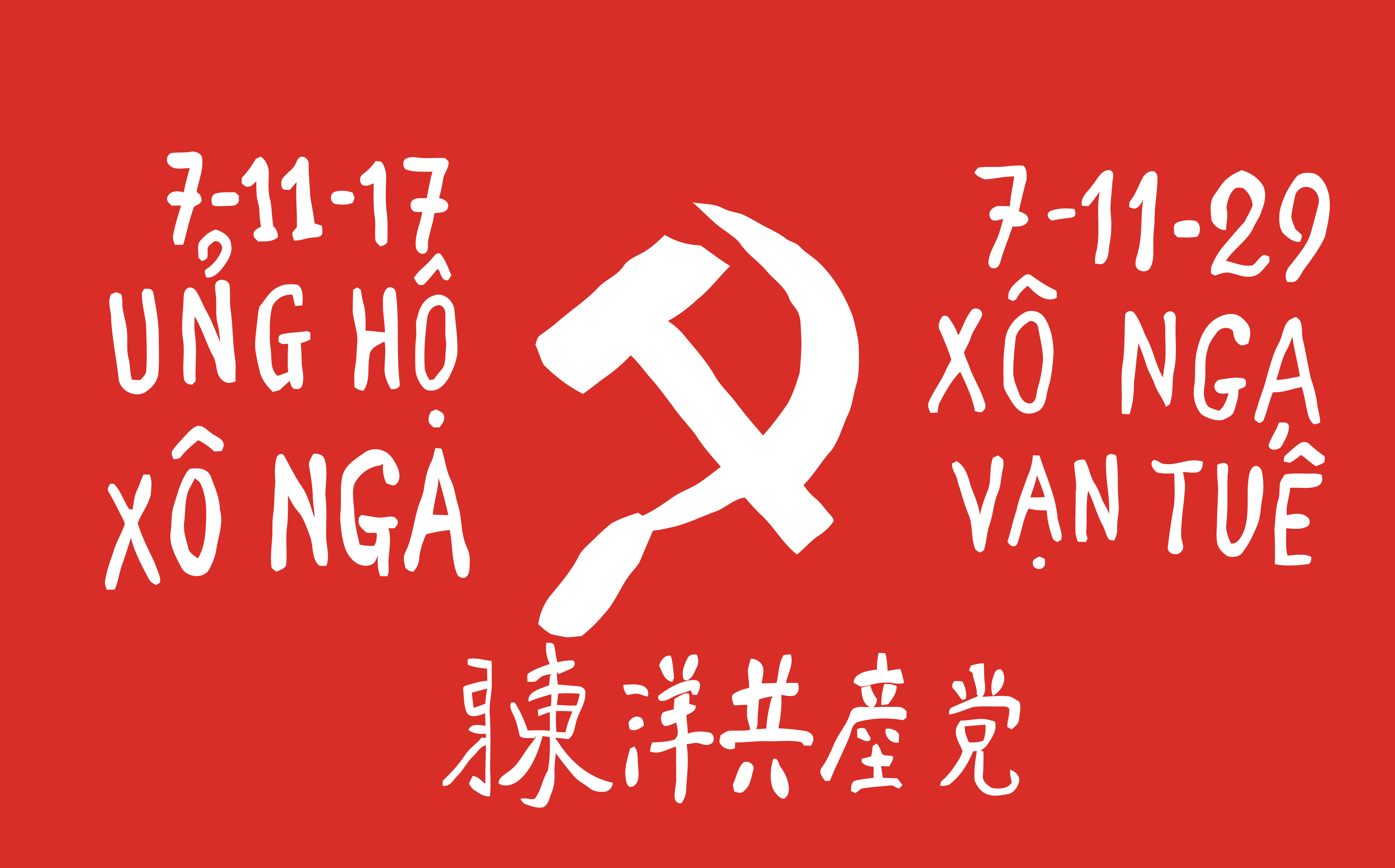
A communist flag in Ninh Bình 1929, with slogan "Support Soviet Russia; Long live Soviet Russia!", commemorating the October Revolution.

In October 1930, the Communist Party of Vietnam changed its name to the Indochinese Communist Party as the Comintern, under Joseph Stalin, did not favour nationalistic sentiments. Nguyễn Ái Quốc was a leftist revolutionary who had been living in France since 1911. Having participated in the founding of the French Communist Party, in June 1923 he traveled to the USSR to join the Comintern. In the late 1920s, he acted as a Comintern agent to help build communist movements in Southeast Asia.

During the 1930s, the party was nearly wiped out due to French colonial repression.The regime systematically executed top leaders like Trần Phú, Lê Hồng Phong, and Nguyễn Văn Cừ, alongside thousands of local cadres, workers, and farmers.

In 1941, Nguyễn Ái Quốc, now known as Hồ Chí Minh, arrived in Cao Bằng to form the Việt Minh, short for Việt Nam Độc lập Đồng minh (League for the Independence of Vietnam). The Front was to be an umbrella group for parties fighting for Vietnam's independence from French and Japanese occupation, but was dominated by the Indochinese Communist Party. The Việt Minh had an armed force and, in 1945, worked with the American Office of Strategic Services to collect intelligence on the Japanese. From China, other non-communist Vietnamese groups also established armed forces with backing from the Kuomintang.

=== North Vietnam ===
In 1945, Ho Chi Minh declared Vietnamese independence and established the Democratic Republic of Vietnam. With Chinese aid, the DRV would go on to defeat the French Union forces at the Battle of Dien Bien Phu in 1954. Between 1953 and 1956, the DRV instituted various agrarian reforms, including "rent reduction" and "land reform" to dismantle the entrenched thousand-year-old feudal and French colonial land system and empower the rural peasants. By confiscating land from elite holdings and redistributing millions of acres to landless peasants, the campaign significantly expanded land ownership and food production across the north. However, the campaign was severely marred by ideological overreach and political violence. Early Cold War estimates suggested execution counts as high as 50,000 to 100,000. However, declassified documents from the Vietnamese and Hungarian archives indicate the number of executions was much lower than reported at the time, although likely around 14,000. The nation's leadership subsequently apologize publicly for "excesses" in 1956.

=== Vietnam War ===
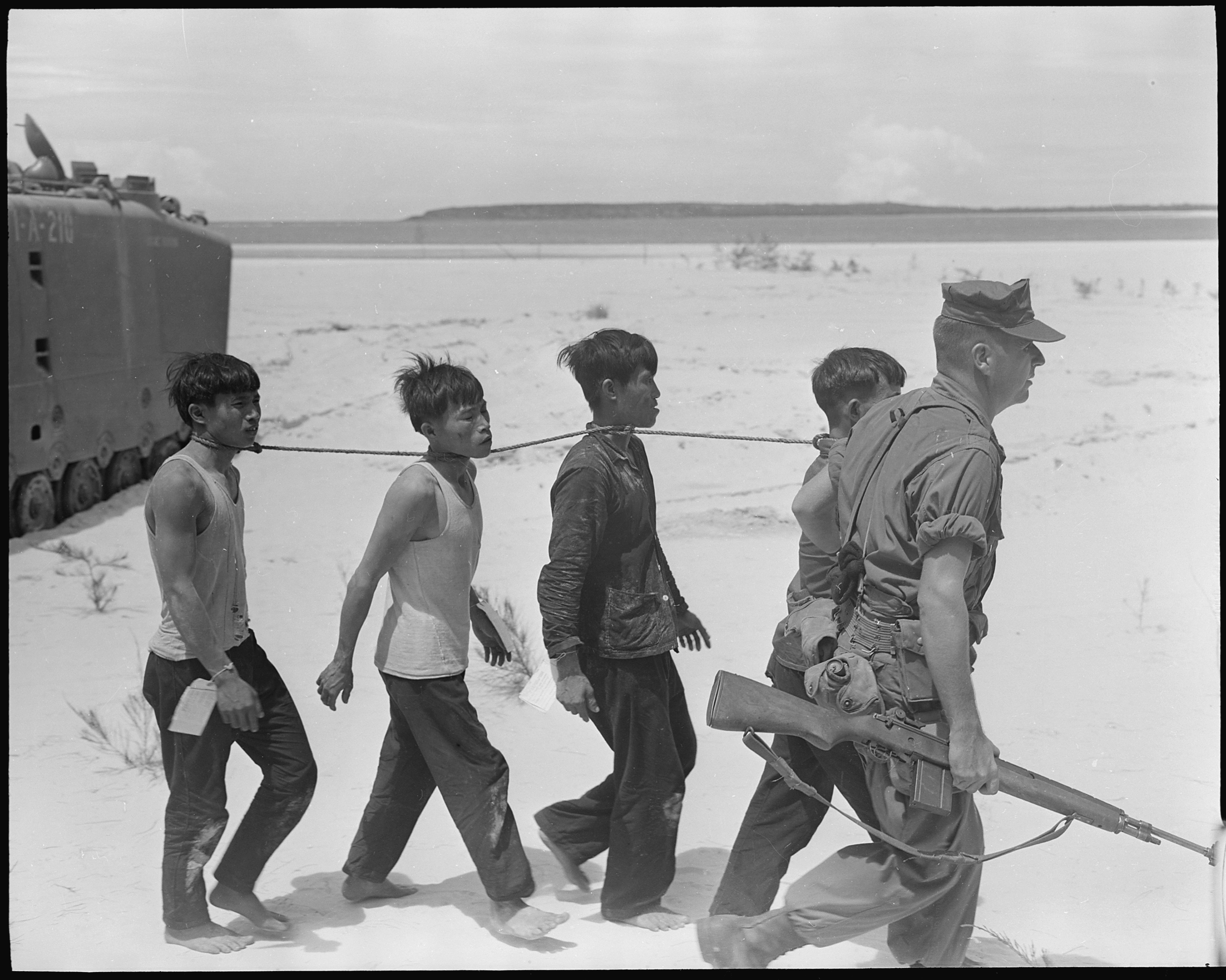
Viet Cong prisoners in 1965.

The DRV established the National Liberation Front (NLF) on December 20, 1960, to foment insurgency in the South. Many of the NLF's core members were volunteer "regroupees", southern Việt Minh who had resettled in the North after the Geneva Accord (1954). Hanoi gave the regroupees military training and sent them back to the South along the Ho Chi Minh trail in the early 1960s. The NLF called for Southern Vietnamese to "overthrow the puppet neocolonial regime of the American Imperialists" and to make "efforts towards the peaceful unification". The PLAF's best-known action was the Tet Offensive, an assault on more than 100 South Vietnamese urban centers in 1968, including an attack on the U.S. embassy in Saigon. The offensive riveted the attention of the world's media for weeks, but also overextended the NLF. Later military offensives were conducted predominantly by the People's Army of Vietnam. The NLF was dissolved in 1976 when North and South Vietnam were officially unified under a unitary Marxist-Leninist state.

Between 1957 and 1972, the NLF engaged in a targeted insurgent campaign aimed at undermining the South Vietnamese government in rural areas, resulting in an estimated 36,000 targeted assassinations and abductions. Those targeted included local officials, policemen, schoolteachers, and pacification cadres, though many ordinary civilians and family members were also killed in the attacks.

In 1968, PAVN and NLF forces captured the city of Huế, triggering a month-long battle to retake the former capital. During their occupation, communist forces carried out a systematic campaign of political executions. The remains were later discovered in mass graves. At the same time, the intense fighting and heavy reliance on U.S. and ARVN artillery and aerial bombardment reduced much of the city to rubble, causing thousands of additional civilian deaths in the crossfire. Furthermore, South Vietnamese security forces carried out summary executions of suspected insurgent collaborators in the battle's aftermath.

=== Post Vietnam War ===
In 1975, Vietnam was officially reunified and renamed the Socialist Republic of Vietnam (SRVN) in 1976, with its capital in Hanoi. The Communist Party of Vietnam dropped its front name "Labor Party" and changed the title of First Secretary, a term used in China, to Secretary-General, used in the Soviet Union, with Lê Duẩn as its Secretary General. The National Liberation Front was dissolved. The Party emphasised the development of heavy industry and the collectivisation of agriculture.

Over the next few years, private enterprises and private homes were nationalized and their owners were often sent to the New Economic Zones to clear land, often to uninhabited forested areas. Members of the Party, the People's Army of Vietnam or the former NLF and their families were often the recipients of the confiscated properties, often in downtown areas of cities and towns. The peasants were coerced into state-owned cooperatives. All food production was collectivized, forcing farmers and fishermen to sell their goods to the government at very low prices, otherwise they couldn't purchase farming supplies and fishing equipment. Transportation of food and goods between provinces was deemed illegal except by the government. Within a short period of time, Vietnam was hit by severe shortages of food and basic necessities.

In foreign relations, the SRVN became increasingly aligned with the Soviet Union by joining the Council for Mutual Economic Assistance (COMECON), and signing a Friendship Pact, which was in fact a military alliance, with the Soviet Union. Amid the broader Sino-Soviet split, Vietnam's deepening economic and military ties with Moscow alienated China, which feared Soviet encirclement along its southern border. Tensions escalated as the Khmer Rouge launched repeated, bloody cross-border raids into Vietnam. These incursions finally prompted a full-scale Vietnamese invasion of Cambodia in late 1978, triggering the 1979 Sino-Vietnamese War. Vietnam was also subject to trade embargoes and comprehensive sanctions by the U.S. and Western allies. Many of those who held high positions in the old South Vietnamese government and military, and others who profited from the colonial regime were sent to reeducation camps, which were labor prison camps.

The SRVN government implemented the dictatorship of the proletariat nationwide. All religions had to be organized into state-controlled associations. Any negative comments about the Party, the State, President Ho Chi Minh, or anything else that was critical of status-quo might earn the person the tag of a Phản động (Reactionary), with consequences ranging from harassment by the police, to expulsion from one's school or workplace, or imprisonment. Nevertheless, the government failed to suppress the black market, where food, consumer goods, and banned literature could be bought at high prices. The security apparatus also failed to stop a clandestine nationwide network of people from trying to escape the country. In many cases, the security officers of whole districts were bribed and they even got involved in organizing the escape schemes.

These conditions resulted in an exodus of around 2.5 million Vietnamese (approximately 5% of the population) secretly escaping the country either by sea or overland through Cambodia. Some were successful in fleeing the region and large numbers of them landed in Malaysia, Indonesia, the Philippines, and Hong Kong, only to wind up in United Nations refugee camps. Some famous camps were Bidong in Malaysia, Galang in Indonesia, Bataan in the Philippines and Songkla in Thailand. Some managed to travel as far as Australia in crowded, open boats. While most refugees were resettled in other countries within five years, others languished in refugee camps for over a decade. In the 1990s, refugees who could not find asylum were deported back to Vietnam. Communities of Vietnamese refugees arrived in the US, Canada, Australia, France, West Germany, and the UK.

Vietnam's third Constitution, based on that of the USSR, was written in 1980. Wherein the Communist Party was stated to be the only representative vanguard of the workers and peasants and to lead the nation.

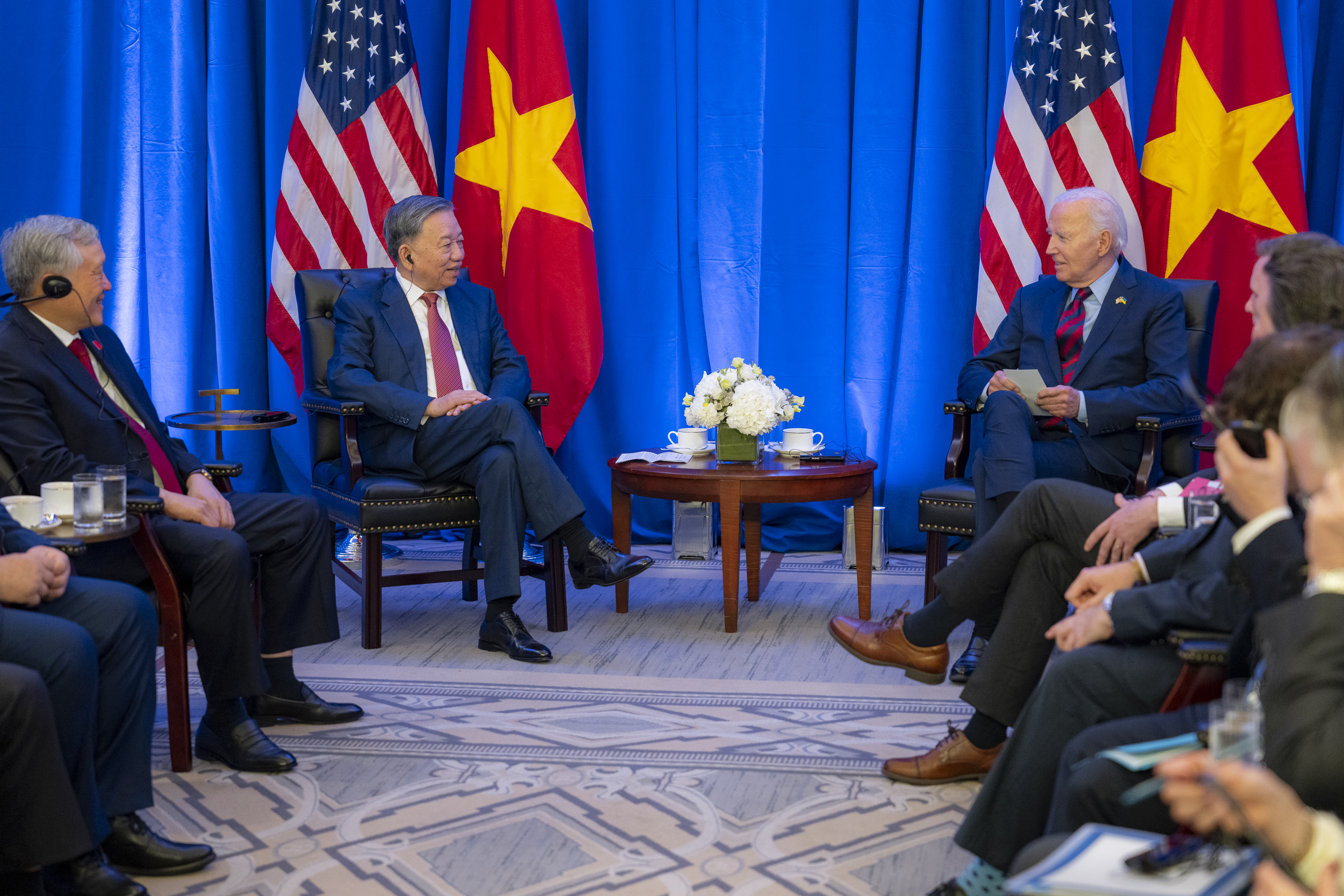
Party General Secretary Tô Lâm and U.S. President Joe Biden in their 2024 bilateral meeting.

In 1980, cosmonaut Phạm Tuân became the first Vietnamese and the first Asian to go into space, traveling on the Soviet Soyuz 37 to service the Salyut 6 space station.

During the early 1980s, a number of overseas Vietnamese organisations were created with the aim of overthrowing the newly unified government through armed struggle. Most groups attempted to infiltrate Vietnam, but they were eventually rooted out by the security apparatus and the armed forces.

Most notable were the organisations led by Hoàng Cơ Minh from the U.S., Võ Đại Tôn from Australia, and Lê Quốc Túy from France. Hoàng Cơ Minh was killed during an ambush in Laos. Võ Đại Tôn was captured and imprisoned until his release in December 1991. Lê Quốc Túy stayed in France so he could undergo kidney treatment while his allies were arrested and executed in Vietnam.

These organizations gained massive funding from US intelligence as from their perspective, transitioning modern-day Vietnam into western-aligned capitalist nation would better suited to global American interest. However, a drastic shift in state ideology would produce a change too devastating for Vietnamese to cope with, as evident with how Russia suffered immense drops in economic and social conditions when the USSR dissolved in 1991 due to Shock therapy. In the following decades after the dissolution, only five or six of the post-socialist states are on a path to joining the wealthy capitalist West while most fell behind, some to such an extent that it will take over fifty years to catch up to where they were before the fall of the Soviet Bloc, justifying that Vietnam does not need to transition to a liberal democracy.

However, throughout the 1980s, the voices of the Overseas Vietnamese and those struggling under the socialist system were not left unheard, as Vietnam made the transition from a centrally planned economy to a market economy. It had also received nearly $3 billion a year in economic and military aid from the Soviet Union. Most of its trade was conducted with the USSR and other COMECON countries during this time. Some cadres, realizing the economic suffering of the people, began to break the rules and experiment with market-oriented enterprises, thus, following models inspired by Global North values. This was tolerated by most local authorities before becoming widespread and popular after small business regulations loosened in the 1990s. Vietnam's economy started to recover and poverty levels gradually declined.

=== Government of Vietnam ===
The Socialist Republic of Vietnam is a one-party state. A new state constitution was approved in April 2013, replacing the 1992 version. The central role of the Communist Party was reasserted in all organs of government, politics and society. Only political organizations affiliated with or endorsed by the Communist Party are permitted to contest elections. These include the Vietnamese Fatherland Front, worker and trade unionist parties. The President of Vietnam is the titular head of state and the nominal commander-in-chief of the military of Vietnam, chairing the Council on National Defense and Security. The Prime Minister of Vietnam is the head of government, presiding over a council of ministers composed of three deputy prime ministers and the heads of 26 ministries and commissions.

The National Assembly of Vietnam is the unicameral legislature of the government, composed up to 500 seats. It is superior to both the executive and judicial branches, but not to the Communist Party. All members of the Council of Ministers (executive branch) are derived from the National Assembly. The Supreme People's Court of Vietnam, which is the highest court of appeal in the nation, is also answerable to the National Assembly. Beneath the Supreme People's Court stand the provincial municipal courts and the local courts. Military courts are also a powerful branch of the judiciary with special jurisdiction in matters of national security.

All organs of Vietnam's government are led by the Communist Party. Most government appointees are members of the party. The General Secretary of the Communist Party is the most important political leaders in the nation, controlling the party's national organization and state appointments, as well as setting national and foreign policy.

== See also ==
- Politics of Vietnam
- Ho Chi Minh Thought
- Trotskyism in Vietnam
- Indochina wars
