= Hóc Môn district =

Hóc Môn district Huyện Hóc Môn
- District
- Position in HCMC's metropolitan area

- Location within Vietnam
- Coordinates: 10°52′42″N 106°35′33″E
- Country: Vietnam
- Centrally governed city: Ho Chi Minh City
- Divisions: 1 township, 11 communes

Area
  - Total: 109 km^{2} (42 sq mi)

Population (2019)
  - Total: 542,243
  - Density: 4,970/km^{2} (12,900/sq mi)

Demographics
  - Main ethnic groups: predominantly Kinh
- Time zone: UTC+07 (ICT)
- Website: hocmon.hochiminhcity.gov.vn

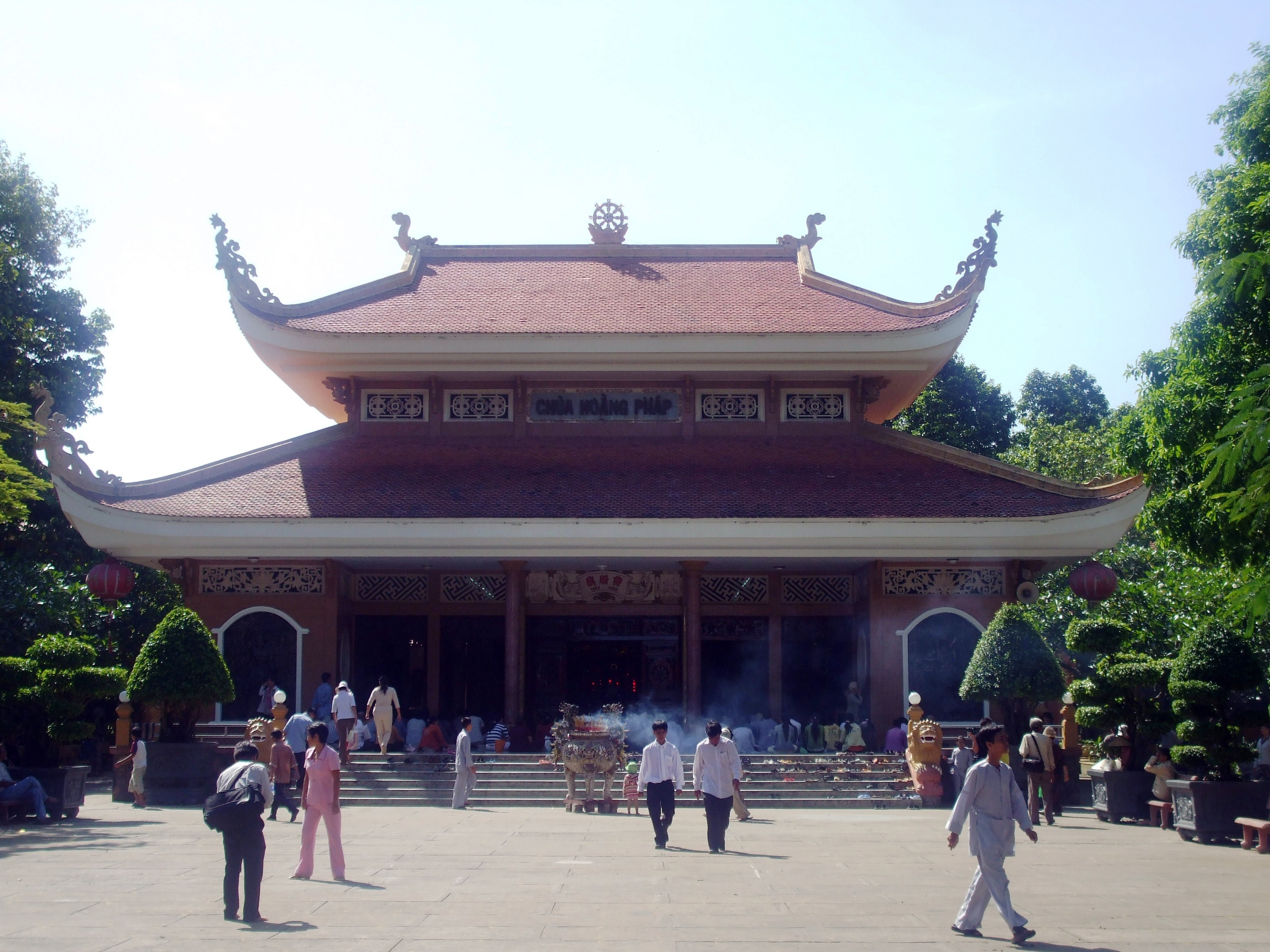
Hoằng Pháp Temple

Hóc Môn is a former suburban district of Ho Chi Minh City, Vietnam. In 2019, the district had a population of 542,243 and an area of 109 km^{2} (42 sq mi).

== Geographical location ==
Hóc Môn District borders Củ Chi district to the north, Bình Dương province to the east, District 12 to the south, and Bình Chánh and Bình Tân districts to the west.

== Administration ==
Hóc Môn District now consists of the town of Hóc Môn (thị trấn Hóc Môn) and 11 communes (xã):

- Bà Điểm
- Đông Thạnh
- Nhị Bình
- Tân Hiệp
- Tân Thới Nhì
- Tân Xuân
- Thới Tam Thôn
- Trung Chánh
- Xuân Thới Đông
- Xuân Thới Sơn
- Xuân Thới Thượng

== History ==
Between 1698 and 1731, some people from the northern and central regions of Vietnam moved to Hóc Môn to escape the constant warfare between the Nguyễn and the Trịnh. At that time, this area was still undeveloped land, with wild animals including tigers roaming free. Because a great deal of taro grew in the swampy areas there, the new settlers called this place "Hóc Môn", meaning "the corner/alley with taro." In 1885 a revolt broke out at the Eighteen Betel Nut Gardens. However, in Khmer language "Hóc Môn" is spelled (by Annamese pronunciation) of "ហុកម៉ូន" (Hok-maun).

The Giồng T-road junction (ngã ba Giồng) at Hóc Môn is a road intersection where many anticolonial prisoners were executed by French firing squads, including Phan Đăng Lưu, Hà Huy Tập, Nguyễn Thị Minh Khai, Võ Văn Tần and Nguyễn Văn Cừ on 28 August 1941.

In April 1997, seven communes split to create District 12: Thạnh Lộc, An Phú Đông, Tân Thới Hiệp, Đông Hưng Thuận, Tân Thới Nhất, a piece of Tân Chánh Hiệp and a piece of Trung Mỹ Tây.
