= 1940 Cochinchina uprising =

Peasant uprising in French Indochina

Cochinchina uprising
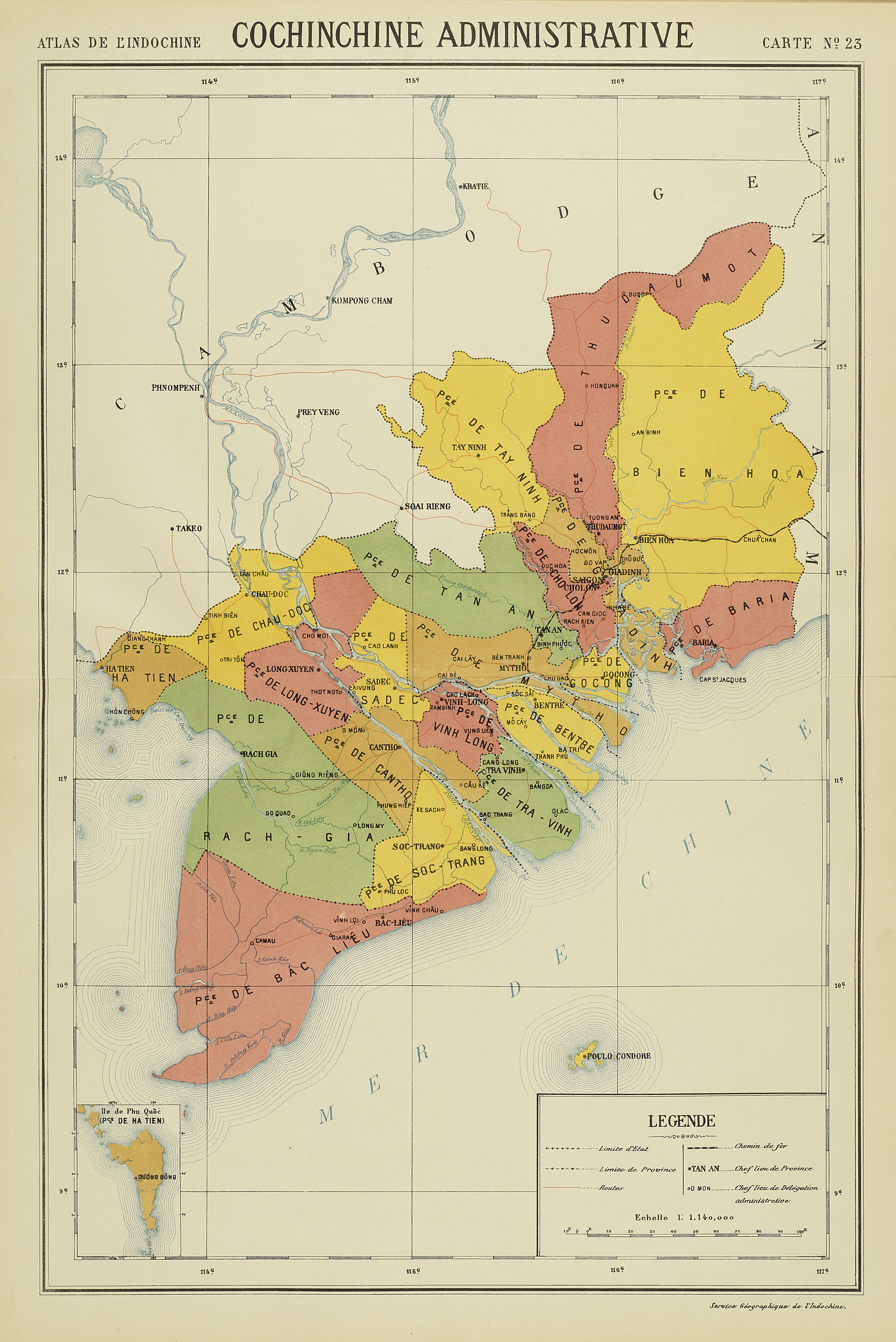
- Map of French Cochinchina, 1920
Date	22 November 1940 – 31 December 1940
Location	French Cochinchina
Result	French victory • Uprising suppressed

Belligerents
Vichy France: French Indochina	Indochinese Communist Party

Commanders and leaders
(Vichy France) Jean Decoux (Vichy France) René Veber	Nguyễn Văn Cừ (POW); Võ Văn Tần (POW); Lê Duẩn (POW); Phan Đăng Lưu (POW); Hà Huy Tập (POW); Tạ Uyên (executed); Nguyễn Thị Minh Khai (POW); Võ Văn Kiệt

Strength
Unknown	Unknown

Casualties and losses
Unknown	Unknown

The Cochinchina uprising (Vietnamese: Nam Kỳ khởi nghĩa) was an armed peasant uprising against the French colonialists by the Vietnamese in the south (at that time known as Cochinchina) in 1940, led by the Indochinese Communist Party.

== Historical background ==
In June 1940, France was invaded by the Germany troops. Given this opportunity, in September, the Japanese invaded the colonised-by-France Indochina peninsula. From here, Vietnam was controlled by two foreign powers, the French and the Japanese. The Vietnamese appear to have expected Japanese support for the uprising, given the fact that the Japanese had been aiding most other Southeast Asian nations with the hope that they would support the plan for the Greater East Asia Co-Prosperity Sphere. Instead, the Vietnamese denounced the Japanese as traitors for not helping them achieve independence from French colonial rule. With the anti-French spirit and the Bac Son Uprising, many people from South Vietnamese provinces revolted against the French and Japanese. In Southern Indochina, the French had to deal with claims from Thailand which, backed by the Japanese, demanded territories situated to the Northwest of Cambodia's Tonle Sap and on the right bank of the Mekong River in Laos. Units of Vietnamese troops were sent to the front to fight the Thais. Some of these units stationed in Saigon decided to rebel against being sent to the front. This plan was part of the program of the Party Committee for Cochinchina which from June 1940 on had actively prepared for an uprising. A plan of action was worked out with the aim of combining the actions of military units in revolt with those of worker and peasant organizations throughout Cochinchina. As it so happened, the French did not go to war with Thailand, and thus they could devote their whole strength against the insurgents and easily decimated the South Vietnamese ICP. With this, it can be said that the insurgents who carried out the uprising had initially believed that Thailand would involve themselves in the conflict, causing a distraction to the French, which would help them, unfortunately for them, this would not happen.

== Preparation ==
In March 1940, the Standing Committee of the Party, headed by Võ Văn Tần, drafted the outline to prepare for an anti-French movement, and then prepared for armed uprising. Many demonstrations occurred during that time.

Self-defense forces and guerrillas which directly led by Võ Văn Tần, Phan Đăng Lưu were formed in big factories in Saigon such as Ba Son, FACI, pier, Cho Quan lamp. In rural areas, most communes had a squadron or even a guerrilla platoon.

Popular discontent was on the rise in the South and provided, at least momentarily, an opportunity for the ICP to release its frustration at the events since the previous September. At the root of the unrest in the South was economics. High taxes, a fall in the price of rice, and an increase in unemployment all served to cut the standard of living for the average Vietnamese. Throughout the spring and summer of 1940, peasant riots against French conscription for military service along the Cambodian-Thai border, where the threat of war was high. Peasant protests against conscription took place in several towns and villages throughout the delta.

As the wave of discontent in the South rose, the Party's Regional Committee for Cochinchina attempted to ride the crest, concentrating its propaganda on peasants and newly drafted Vietnamese troops. Since the restoration of the Party apparatus in Cochinchina in the early 1930s, the regional Party organization under the direction of Stalin School graduate Tran Van Giau had possessed a unique degree of autonomy and under Giau's autocratic leadership was somewhat inclined toward making decisions independent of the national party leadership. Now, with almost all members of the ICP central Committee in the South in jail, regional leaders took matters in their own hands and began to plan for a general uprising in response to the decisions reached at the Sixth Plenum the previous November. After the French surrender to Nazi Germany in June, they hastily convened an expanded Party conference in My Tho, deep in the heart of the Mekong delta and agreed to initiate preparations for the insurrection. By autumn, half the indigenous troops in Cochinchina were allegedly sympathetic to the Communists, with ICP sources estimating that up to 30 percent of the entire population of the colony was on its side.

All blacksmiths produced weapons day by day in order to provide ammunition to army. The anti-war movement, combating the soldiers with the slogan "no soldier, no penny for imperial war" took place the people and soldiers community. Due to good military service, most of the 15,000 Vietnamese soldiers in the French army stationed in Saigon were willing to co-ordinate the uprising.

== Development ==
Party leaders in Cochinchina, however, were understandably hoping to seek support for the uprising from revolutionary elements elsewhere in the country, and in October they sent Phan Đăng Lưu, representative of the Central Committee of the Indochinese Communist Party, to consult with members of the ICP Regional Committee for Tonkin. North Vietnamese delegates had not been able to attend the Sixth Plenum in November 1939 and were thus not well informed about the Central Committee's plans to move toward a general insurrection against French colonial rule.

Several members of the regional committee, including Truong Cinh, Hoang Van Thu, and Hoang Quoc Viet met with Phan Dang Luu in early November in a suburb of Hanoi. The meeting took place in the immediate aftermath of the abortive revolt in Bac Son, and its decisions reflected an understandable ambivalence about the possibilities of armed uprising. The session reaffirmed the decision of the Sixth Plenum to begin preparations for a future armed uprising against French power, and it affirmed the contention that, if conditions were favorable, a local uprising could be launched in one area of the country even if Vietnamese society as a whole was not in a revolutionary situation. But it condemned what it considered the mistakes committed at Bac Son. The local leadership at Bac Son, it claimed, did not know how to establish revolutionary power, did not know how to conduct propaganda activities and develop revolutionary strength, and, when the battle was over, did not know how to retreat. The decision to abandon the cities for the countryside was termed an error that weakened the Party's urban base. Then, it said, the Party had lost an opportunity to launch a general uprising after French surrendered in June 1940. Finally, it criticized the new united front as vaguely defined and not sufficiently focused on the worker-peasant alliance. Looking to the future, the plenum concluded that Vietnam was not yet in a directly revolutionary situation, but that the revolution could break out in the form of local uprising where conditions were appropriate, leading the way toward a general uprising that would result in a seizure of power in the country as a whole. In perpetration for that moment, the Committee members called for the conservation of the remnants of the Bac Son forces, which were to be reorganized as guerrilla units, and for a revolutionary base in the Viet Bac to wait for the appropriate moment to launch an uprising.

Given the judgments above, it is not surprising that the meeting suspected that conditions for an armed uprising were lacking in the South. Local forces were too small, and units in the Center and the North were in no position to give adequate support. So Phan Dang Luu was informed that an uprising in Cochinchina should be postponed until the Central Committee could send a representative to check on the national situation and provide proper leadership. If the uprising should fail in spite of such preparations, the rebels must be prepared to make an orderly retreat and transform the defeated forces into guerrilla units.

The meeting also took steps to reconstitute the ICP Central Committee, which had become nearly defunct as the result of the recent arrest of most of its members in the South. Acting on the authority of the one remaining member, Phan Dang Luu, those in attendance named themselves a new provisional central committee with Truong Cinh serving temporarily as general secretary until new elections could be held. This November meeting of the Regional Committee of Tonkin is thus known in Party histories as the Seventh Plenum of the ICP.

Immediately after the meeting, Phan Dang Luu returned to Cochinchina to give his colleagues the bad news that their comrades in Tonkin did not favor a general uprising. But on the evening of 22 November he was arrested by French police at the railway station in Saigon. Advised in advance of the revolt, the French declared martial law and disarmed all indigenous troops in the area.

In the Mekong delta, however, the Regional Committee was growing increasingly restive. With 15,000 in the uprising organization and the rebellious troops increasingly impatient for action, the Regional Committee now decided that it could wait no longer for the return of Phan Dang Luu and decided to schedule the outbreak for the night of 22–23 November. the uprising was concentrated on several district and provincial capitals throughout the Mekong delta. French military posts were to be attacked, communications links cut, and revolutionary power established at the village level. Attacks took place as scheduled in such delta towns as Soc Trang, Bac Lieu, Tan An, Vinh Long and Can Tho, as well as in rural areas along the edge of the Plain of Reeds. In some areas, the masses seized power, formed revolutionary tribunals to punish class enemies, and raised flags in the name of the National United Front. These were plans for an attack on Saigon as well, but the French prevented disturbances by confiscating weapons and blocking entrances to the city.

The course of the insurrection can be divided into three periods. The first period was from 22 to 30 November which was the most intense period of the insurgency. The second was from 30 to 13 December when the insurrection spread to the region of the inter-provincial committee of Long Xuyen and to Rach Gia and Bac Lieu. The final period from 12 to 31 December is centered on the Poulo-Obi incident in Bac Lieu

The revolutionary governments were existed in very short time, the longest one in My Tho was about 49 days. French colonialists vehemently oppressed, seeking to destroy the revolutionary government. It was during this uprising that the flag of North Vietnam was raised at Cao Lanh in the western delta. The revolt began in the Plaine des Joncs in the western delta and none of the northern provinces were affected. The slogans of the uprising included "Land to the Tillers, Freedom for the workers and independence for Vietnam". One of the leaders of the uprising was a man who later became the father of the trade union movement in Vietnam, Tran Quoc Buu. Buu was the founder of the CVT.

=== The 22–30 November Period ===
The most intense fighting occurred simultaneously on 22 and 23 November 1940 in Gia Dinh, Cholon, My Tho and Can Tho, which were centres of inter-provincial committees of the ICP. The attacks started at 10 pm on 22 November. The success of the insurrection in Gia Dinh My Tho and Can Tho on 22 and 23 November persuaded ICP insurgents in other provinces to fight. As a result, from 23 November, the insurrection spread to many provinces, even though by that time the government had started to retaliate by using all its force to suppress the rebellion. These included aerial bombardment and the leveling of many villages. However, the government was not able to stop the uprising in the provinces. Village notables were the main targets of the attacks because they were representatives of the colonial administration of the village level. Even though their administrative power was very limited, they were still the liaison between the colonial administration and the peasants.

=== The 30 November – 13 December period ===
This was the period where the insurrection in Gia Dinh, My Tho and Can Tho became less intense and the ICP was on the defensive but when fighting broke out in the inter-provincial region of Long Xuyen. Communist insurgents in that region were in disarray due to the repressive measures of the government, and were not able to rise at the same time as their comrades in other areas even though they received the insurrection order on 22 November. The ICP in this region lost a good opportunity, given that the Inter-Provincial Committee of Long Xuyen was very active in preparing the insurrection. The Long Xuyen Committee ordered its party members to manufacture arms and ammunition in September, and that in October it asked the Cochinchina Committee to send instructors to teach tactics to the guerrilla groups newly formed by the committee. Moreover, the Far West region had serious peasants problems in the second half of the 1930s which would have been an important factor if the ICP were to win over the masses should the insurrection have taken place as originally planned.

The main targets were the three town centres and their suburbs. Strategic targets such as post offices, police stations and ferries were included in the attack plans. Due to bad communications between party members and the arrest of important members of the party, the provinces of Rach Gia and Bac Lieu remained calm during this period, even though Rach Gia was the first province able to form an insurrection group, in September 1940, Ben Tre also saw only small-scale fighting during this period.

=== The 13–31 December Period ===
The high point of this period was the attack on Poulo Obi lighthouse in Ca Mau district on 13 and 14 December which cost the life of M Olivier, A French lighthouse keeper. By the second half of December, the insurrection had lost momentum and was dying down. In most areas the ICP had to retreat, and the insurgents were only able to distribute tracts or threaten village notables but no serious attacks were undertaken. In Gia Dinh, as well as in Tan An and the Plain of Reeds, the insurgents had to retreat to the dense forests to avoid being hunted down by the authorities. According to a French report, by mid-December, the government was able to control the situation. Thousands of villages who had fled during the insurrection started to return to their homes. Schools reopened and confidence in the French authorities among the Vietnamese was gradually revived. By the end of the year, the insurrection had completely died down.

=== Class distinction during the uprising ===
The picture of solidarity between the revolutionaries and the rich peasants is contradicted by another account of the period, that the revolutionaries destroyed the crops of some rich peasants and well-off middle peasants who possessed a lot of land. A poor peasant whose resentment of the wealthier classes in his village still burned bright in 1971 said that in the pre-1945 period village officials had to be at least middle peasants, and that middle peasants were allied to the landlords and with the hamlet and village te or officials. Village officials were not without their own influence and support against the insurrection, but it was usually not enough to stem the tide. In the market town of Tan Hiep, the village chief had gathered 200 villagers to support the soldiers in the post against the large crown of peasants insurrectionists sweeping through the area. When the crowd approached, however, the villagers all fled, leaving the village officials and militia to cope with the situation. As during the "Vietnam War" period, loyalty to the authority structure did not always extend to defending it to the death, and there was often an asymmetry of commitment between the followers of the opposing sides.

The class categories mentioned in later accounts by witnesses of the 1940 Cochinchina Uprising and the August 1945 revolution were assigned only later, during the land reform after 1945. several interview sources assert that there was little or no awareness of class labels at this time, but only a general awareness of a great divide between the minority of the rich and the majority of the poor in their province. The social and economic dominance of a small number of large landholders and the very high percentage of the rural population who were poor and landless peasants make it easy to see why the simple rich-poor categorization of provincial society was prevalent at the time. It is also clear, however, that almost all observers of these events had little difficulty in retrospectively identifying the different socioeconomic positions of the protagonists of social conflict in the 1930s in terms of the more highly differentiated class categories of a later period, even though the exact designations and terminology may have been applied retrospectively.

The seems to have been a case of a new analytic framework so exactly fitting the reality of the times that it seemed always to have been true. Everyone knew, for example, that landlords were people who owned more land than was necessary to support their families, and that they did not work the land but rented it out. Rich peasants were a less distinct category but it was generally understood that they were in essence small landlords who owned less land but still more than they needed for bare survival, who farmed what they could themselves but hired laborers or rented what they could not work to tenants. Middle peasants were self-sufficient owner-cultivators who owned just enough land to support their families, and who worked it themselves. Poor peasants may have owned a bit of land but not enough to support a family. Typically, they were tenants who rented a specified piece of land from one of the large landholders. Very poor peasants were landless peasants who worked as occasional hired laborers, usually in a depressed labor market. Although these class categories were more elaborately defined during the subsequent land reform period, they were simple and serviceable ways to describe the social reality of the 1930s and 1940s and were used consistently by both interviewees and written sources.

The French response was swift. In Saigon an attempted uprising was quelled in a day; in the delta, unrest dragged on and was finally put down in early December. Unlike their counterparts in the Viet Bac, the rebels were unable to preserve their forces by retreating to isolated areas, and their defeat signaled the temporary collapse of the Party in Cochinchina.

== Aftermath ==
The Communist movement in the south was gravely set back after the suppression of the 1940 uprising, an upsurge of the Hoa Hao movement taking advantage of the new situation. Surviving Communists then purged their own ranks, condemning several to death on the accusation of being double agents. Much later, on the seventeenth anniversary of the uprising, the former chairman of the Viet Minh Committee of the south, Tran Van Giau, cited the November 1940 example as a warning to militants to bide their time against Diem's repressions, least a premature uprising in the south be crushed in 1957 as in 1940 The principal reasons for these failures were that the communists had insufficient men and arms and that the colonial police and security services had broken into the party's communications networks. The repression was directed by the governor of Indochina, Rivoal and his inspector of political and administrative affairs, Brasey, whose chief aide was Nguyen Van Tam. Some 50 people were guillotined, including Nguyen Thi Minh Khai, the sister in law of Vo Nguyen Giap.

In the face of defeat, the province insurrection leadership made three decisions. First, put all the people captured during the uprising of trial right away. The intention was to scare them but release them, recognizing that if they were badly mistreated, they-or their friends, allies and family-would later seek revenge which would not be advantageous for the revolution. There should be no repeat of the public execution of Constable Trau in 1930. A People's Court was set up, with prosecutors chosen from among the peasants and Party members overseeing the proceedings. All those detained were released after warnings not to repress the revolution if they did return to work for the French. The second decision made by the province leadership was to break open the rice granaries and distribute the rice to the needy. The peasants needed little encouragement In Nhi Binh village, they seized the granaries of Nguyen Thanh Long, a large landlord and Doc Phu Mau in Ngu Hiep, as well as other smaller landlords. It took the peasants three days to cart away the contents of Doc Phu Mau's granary. In Long Trung village, the granary of Ho Khai Khoa was spared because his son aligned himself with the revolution. The third decision of the province leadership was to order the insurrection participants to retreat into clandestiny, hide their weapons and wait for an order from the Central Committee for a second uprising. Jennings has called the French reaction to the uprising "repressive" and has also used terms such as "repressive" and "brutal", highlighting how serious the uprising was to the French. Interestingly enough, he also suggests that the event was important in highlighting the need for rural reform as he credits the uprising to the "diminishing prestige of conservative pro-French patriarchs."

The Cochinchina Uprising was a traumatic event but it did not leave as big a mark on My Tho as might have been expected. The event does not feature prominently in revolutionary historiography because it was judged to be a rash and premature act, taken without authorization from the Party's top leadership. It did, of course, result in the temporary breakup of the small band of clandestine organizers. Despite the reports of hundreds or even thousands of participants, and the temporary immobilization of the French authority in much of My Tho province, it seems that the number of core activists was relatively small.
