= General Secretary Nguyễn =

General Secretary Nguyễn may refer to:

- Nguyễn Văn Cừ (1912–1941), former General Secretary of the Communist Party of Indochina (1938-1940)
- Nguyễn Văn Linh (1915–1998), former General Secretary of the Communist Party of Vietnam (1986-1991)
- Nguyễn Phú Trọng (1944- ), current General Secretary of the Communist Party of Vietnam (2011-)
