= Phan Đăng Lưu =

Phan Đăng Lưu (May 5, 1902 – August 28, 1941) was a prominent 20th century Vietnamese revolutionary, politician, intellectual and journalist.

== Early life and background ==
Phan Đăng Lưu was born on May 5, 1902, in the Tràng Thành commune (now Hoa Thành commune), Yên Thành District, Nghệ An Province, Vietnam. His father Phan Đăng Dư (1874–1955) and his mother Trần Thị Liễu had four sons. Three of them, Phan Đăng Lưu (Phán Tằm), Phan Đăng Triều (Phán Triều), Phan Đăng Tài (Phán Tài) would later join the revolutionary struggle against the French colonial occupation.

During the decline of the Mạc dynasty at the end of the 16th century, Mạc Mậu Giang as the son of king Mạc Phúc Nguyên, went to Nghệ An seeking refuge. To avoid political persecution, Mạc Huyền Nhai as the son of Mạc Mậu Giang marked the beginning of Phan (Đăng) as the adjusted surname of this lineage in Yên Thành District, Nghệ An province; "Đăng" being a connotation to the founder of the Mạc dynasty, Mạc Đăng Dung. Phan Đăng Dư is a descendant of Mạc Mậu Giang in the 14th generation. Furthermore, this lineage may be traced back as far as to the renowned 13th century Confucian scholar Mạc Đĩnh Chi under the Trần dynasty, who himself was a descendant of another renowned 11th century Vietnamese scholar Mạc Hiển Tích under the Lý dynasty.

Phan Đăng Dư worked as a pharmacist and geography teacher. In 1908, he joined Chu Trạc in the resistance against local French oppression. Classified as a landowner during the land reform of the 1950s in Vietnam, his family was stripped of its property and house. Phan Đăng Dư was sentenced to 20 years imprisonment and died in 1955 on the way to prison. The house, in which Phan Đăng Lưu grew up, is nowadays a national historical site to commemorate and honor Phan Đăng Lưu and his family's contribution to Vietnam's national struggle for self-determination and independence.

In his early years, Lưu studied Chinese characters. Later, he went to Vinh for his primary education in the French-Vietnamese primary school. Afterwards, he continued his secondary education in the Quốc Học Huế High School. Other sources cite the Quốc Tử Giám - Huế secondary school. He also studied the romanized Vietnamese language and French. Phan Đăng Lưu then enrolled at the College of Agricultural Administration in Tuyên Quang, where he graduated as an agricultural engineer.

== Political struggle before the August Revolution of 1945 ==
In 1923, Lưu began working in the office of experimental sericulture in Đông Ba, Vĩnh Phú province. He was transferred to Diễn Châu District, Nghệ An, in 1925. He also worked in Linh Cảm, Hà Tĩnh Province, in Phú Phong, Bình Định Province, in Đà Lạt and Di Linh, Lâm Đồng Province. Wherever Lưu went, he would be non-chalant about his anti-colonialistic views. This eventually led to his dismissal.

He used this opportunity to immerse himself in the study of communist and anti-imperialistic writings such as Marx's Le Capital or Judgment of French colonialism by Nguyễn Ái Quốc. By that time, he had already been involved in the political movement Hội Phục Việt.

On July 14, 1928, at the general plenum of the Tân Việt Revolutionary Party, Phan Đăng Lưu was voted as a standing member into the central committee of the party, responsible for revolutionary propaganda that included the propagation of a new democratic order and the socialist doctrine. In this function, together with Đào Duy Anh and other members of the Tân Việt Revolutionary Party he co-edited, translated, compiled several works under the party's publishing organ Quan hải tùng thư. It comprised works such as the A.B.C. of Marx's Doctrine ("A.B.C Chủ nghĩa Mác"), New Democracy ("Dân chủ mới"); translations of works such as Social Essays ("Xã hội luận"), A History of economic teachings ("Lược sử các học thuyết kinh tế") or The Communist Manifesto ("Tuyên ngôn Đảng Cộng sản").

At the end of 1928, Lưu and Hà Huy Tập were sent to Guangzhou, China, in order to engage the Vietnam Revolutionary Youth League into a common struggle for liberation and independence. He returned after five months as the Vietnam Revolutionary Youth League went into hiding and contact could not be established. In September 1929, Phan Đăng Lưu went to Guangzhou for a second time to discuss and prepare the foundation of a Vietnamese Communist Party with the Vietnam Revolutionary Youth League. He was later captured in Haiphong and subsequently put to trial with 60 other members of the Tân Việt Revolutionary Party at the Nam triều court in Vinh. Lưu received a prison sentence of three years on 21 January 1930.

Lưu was transferred to the Buon Ma Thuot exile house, where he nevertheless continued to engage in revolutionary activities. While being in prison, he was admitted to the Communist Party of Vietnam that was founded on 3 February 1930. Since most of the prison officers belonged to the Ê Đê people who did not speak any Vietnamese, Lưu began to learn the Ê Đê language. He would then bring out a weekly prison newspaper "Doãn đê tù báo" in Ê Đê and Vietnamese, handwritten and secretly distributed, to foster good relations with the prison officers and to teach other inmates the Ê Đê language. Moreover, he wrote articles in French and Vietnamese, thereby also drawing attention to the severe prison conditions and had them smuggled to the outside whenever inmates would be released. When he was caught, his prison sentence was increased by additional 5 years.

Upon his release from prison in February, 1936, prior to the end of his full sentence due to a democratic and human rights movement in Indochina and France that had formed for the release of political prisoners, Phan Đăng Lưu was admitted into the Communist Party's Committee of Middle Vietnam (Xứ ủy Trung Kỳ). Together with Nguyễn Chí Diểu, Hải Triều, Lâm Mộng Quang, Trịnh Xuân An, Hải Thanh and others he was tasked with taking the Party's political activities into the legal and open sphere of influence. Therefore, Phan Đăng Lưu edited and published many articles in newspapers such as Sông Hương tục bản, Dân, Dân Tiến, Dân Muốn under various pen names such as Đông Tùng, Phi Bằng, Bằng Phi, Sông Hương, Tân Cương, Ly Toét, BCH, QB, SH, KD, Mục tiêu, Thương tâm, KĐ, etc.

During this time, Lưu had a major influence on other revolutionaries in Nghệ Tĩnh and Huế such as Trịnh Xuân An, Tôn Quang Phiệt, Trịnh Quang Xuân, Hà Thế Hanh and also on the younger generation of revolutionaries such as Tố Hữu, Trần Tống, Tran Quynh, Nguyễn Chí Thanh, Võ Nguyên Giáp. In the years between 1937 and 1939, Lưu published influential works and books such as The Capitalist Society ("Xã hội Tư bản"), The Old and New World ("Thế giới cũ và Thế giới mới"), etc.. Since Phan Đăng Lưu was also close to Phan Bội Châu, he would help him to finish his work Phan Bội Châu Chronology ("Phan Bội Châu niên biểu").

In September 1939, Lưu was assigned to move into South Vietnam continuing to lead the party's underground revolutionary activities. In November 1939, at the VI general plenum of the Communist Party's 1st Central Committee, he was admitted as a standing member into the Central Committee ("Ban Thường vụ Trung ương"). The Standing Committee of the Central Committee was the predecessor of the Politburo. At this point in time, he was one of the highest-ranked political members of the Communist Party of Vietnam. At the VII general plenum of the Communist Party's 1st Central Committee in November 1940, he advised to postpone the planned uprising in South Vietnam.

On 22 November 1940, on his way back to Saigon, Lưu was caught and sentenced to death on 3 March 1941. He was executed along with Nguyễn Văn Cừ, Nguyễn Thị Minh Khai, Hà Huy Tập, Võ Văn Tần and Nguyễn Hữu Tiến in Bà Điểm commune, Hóc Môn District, Saigon, on 28 August 1941.

== Memorials ==
Today, streets in Hanoi, Ho Chi Minh City, Thừa Thiên–Huế, Nghệ An, Đà Nẵng, Bà Rịa–Vũng Tàu and in many other places throughout Vietnam bear his name. There are schools and parks named after him, especially in Nghệ An, Huế, Haiphong and Đà Nẵng. A statue in his homeland, Yên Thành, was erected in his honor. There is also a Phan Đăng Lưu prison in Hồ Chí Minh City.
