= Xuân Thới Sơn =

Xuân Thới Sơn Xã Xuân Thới Sơn Tân Thới Nhì, Xuân Thới Đông
- Commune
- Interactive map of Xuân Thới Sơn
- Coordinates: 10°52′35″N 106°33′35″E
- Country: Vietnam
- Municipality: Ho Chi Minh City
- Established: June 16, 2025

Area
  - Total: 13.59 sq mi (35.21 km^{2})

Population (2024)
  - Total: 103,643
  - Density: 7,624/sq mi (2,944/km^{2})
- Time zone: UTC+07:00 (Indochina Time)
- Administrative code: 27577

Xuân Thới Sơn (Vietnamese: Xã Xuân Thới Sơn) is a commune of Ho Chi Minh City, Vietnam. It is one of the 168 new wards, communes and special zones of the city following the reorganization in 2025.

== History ==
On June 16, 2025, the National Assembly Standing Committee issued Resolution No. 1685/NQ-UBTVQH15 on the arrangement of commune-level administrative units of Ho Chi Minh City in 2025 (effective from June 16, 2025). Accordingly, the entire land area and population of Tân Thới Nhì, Xuân Thới Sơn and Xuân Thới Đông communes of the former Hóc Môn district will be integrated into a new commune named Xuân Thới Sơn (Clause 132, Article 1).
