= Hoằng Pháp Temple =

Coordinates: 10.9003°N 106.5818°E

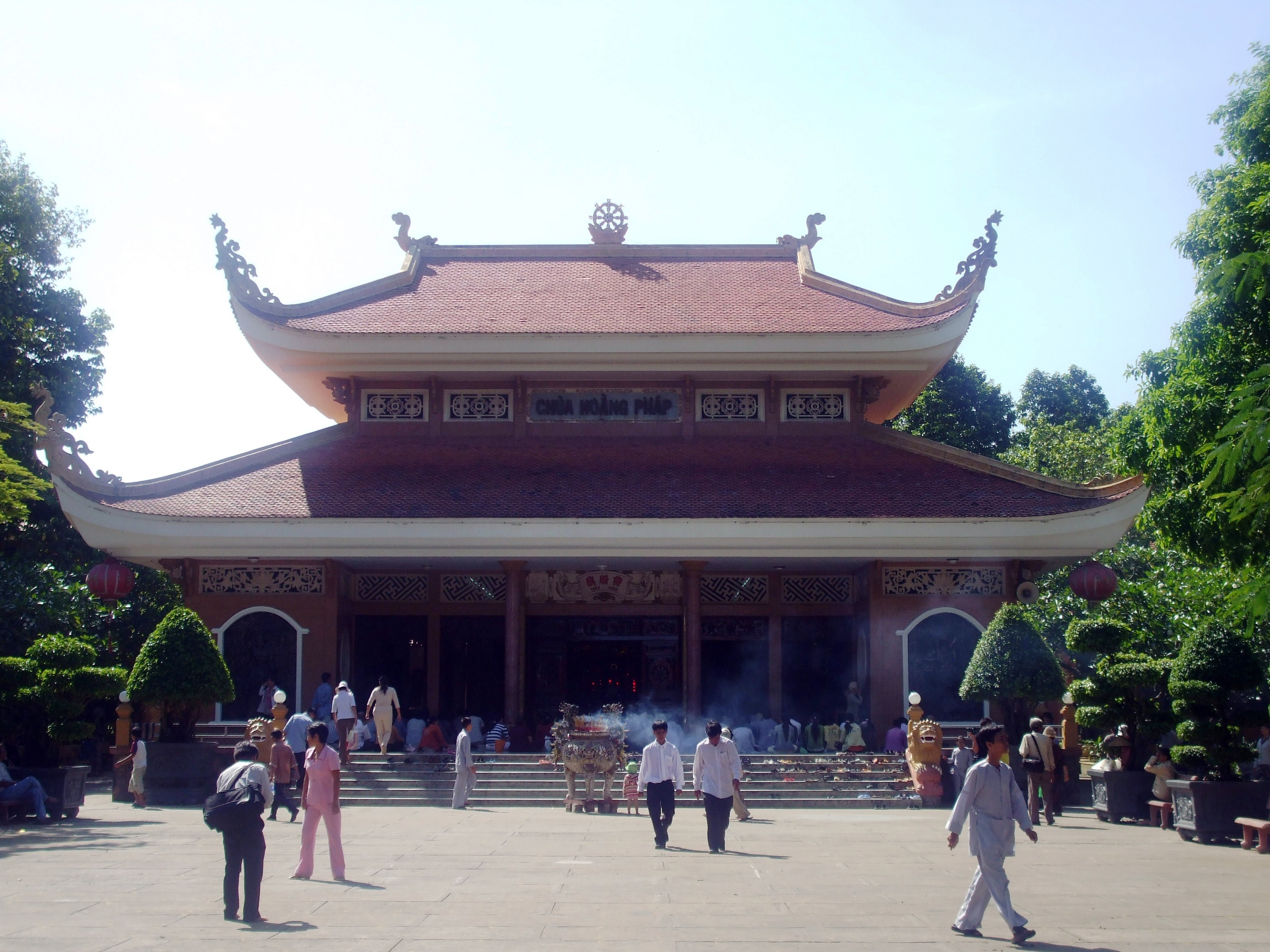
Hoằng Pháp Temple

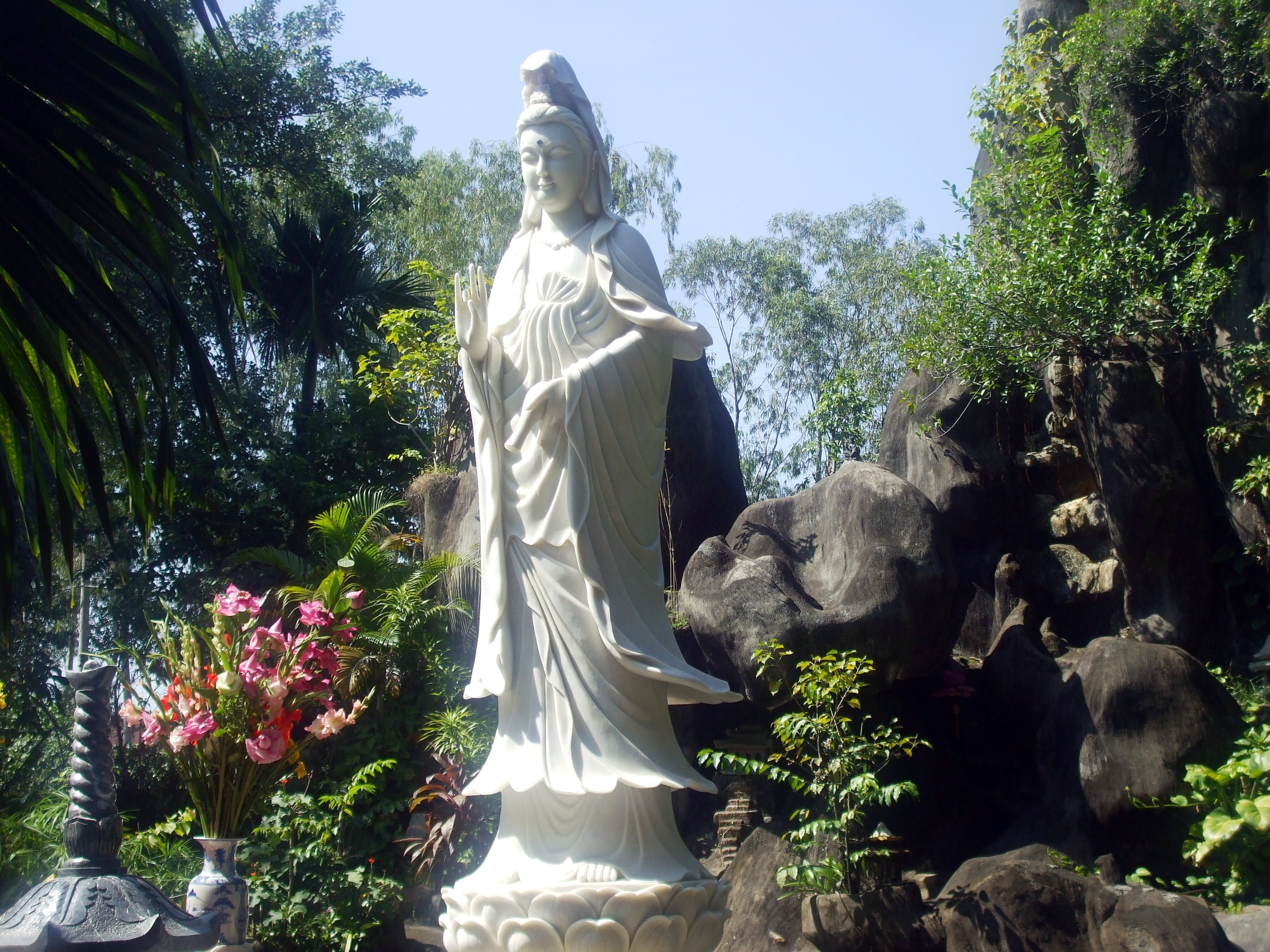
Statue of Quán Thế Âm at Hoằng Pháp Temple

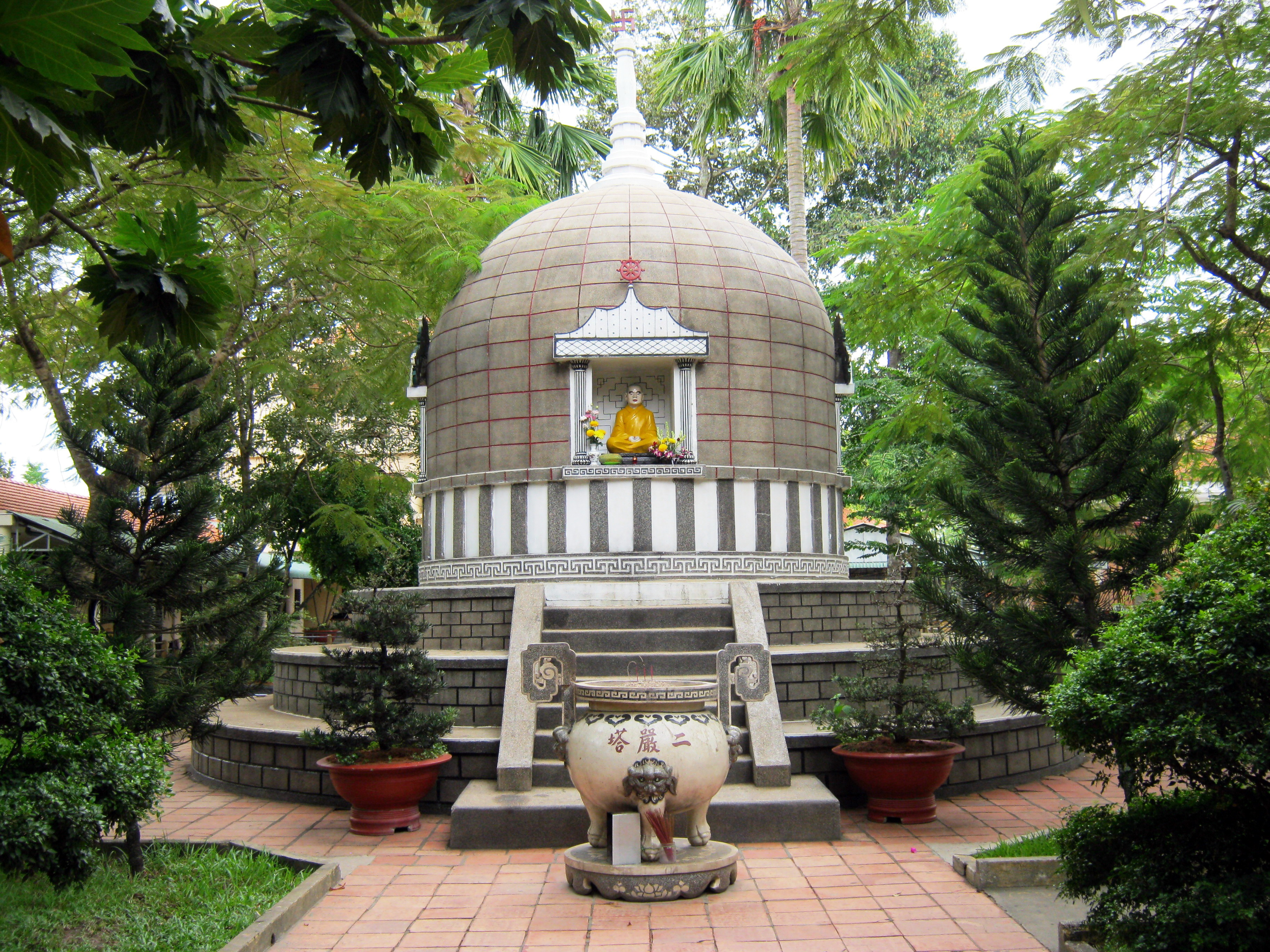
Nhị Nghiêm Tower

Hoằng Pháp Temple (Chùa Hoằng Pháp, built 1957) is a temple in Hóc Môn, a suburb of Ho Chi Minh City.
