= Hà Huy Tập =

Vietnamese revolutionary and General Secretary (1906–1941)

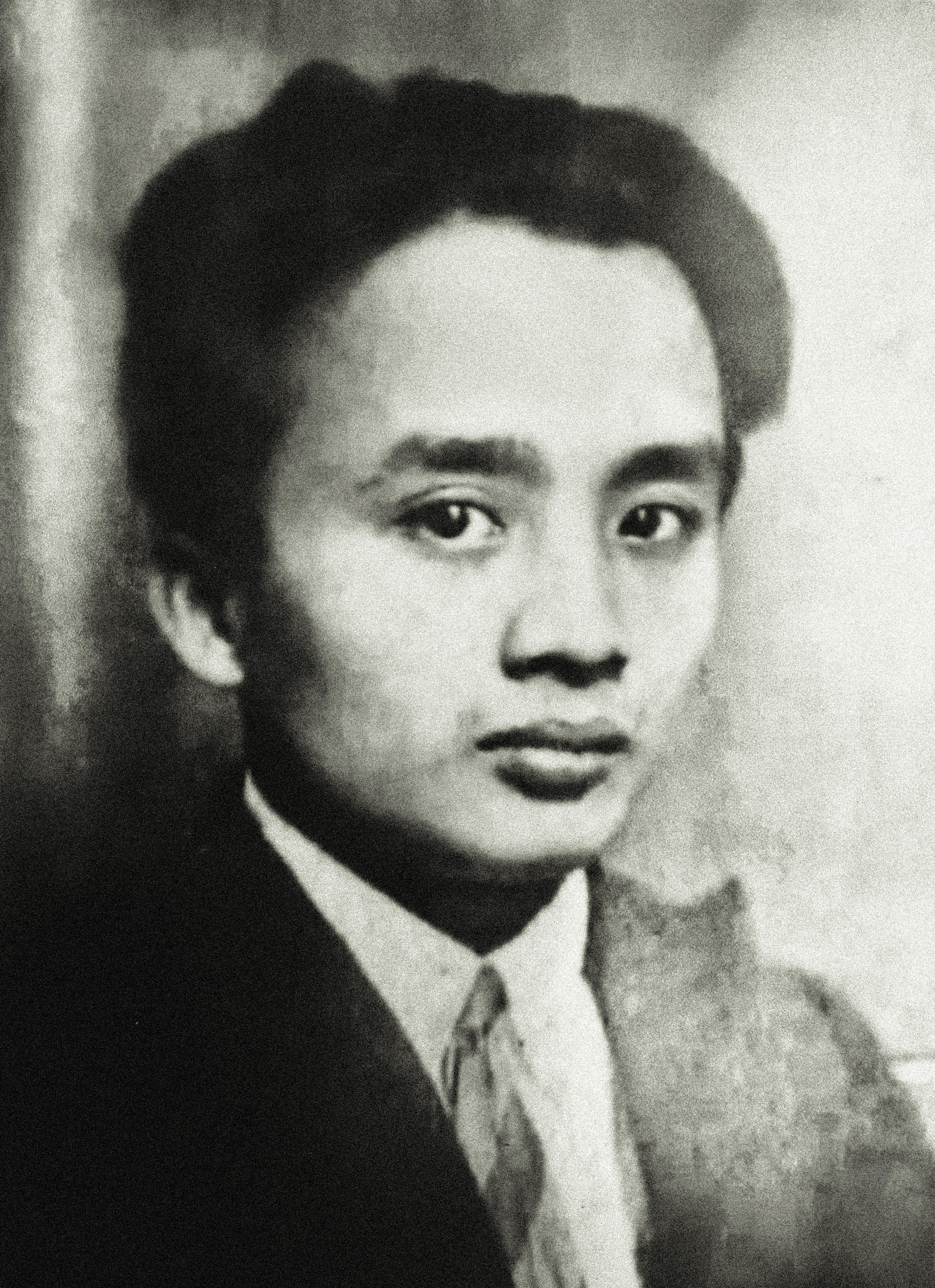

General Secretary of the Central Committee of the Indochinese Communist Party
- In office 26 July 1936 – 30 March 1938
- Preceded by: Lê Hồng Phong
- Succeeded by: Nguyễn Văn Cừ

Personal details
- Born: Hà Huy Khiêm; 24 April 1906 Cẩm Xuyên district, Hà Tĩnh Province, Annam, French Indochina
- Died: 28 August 1941 (aged 35) Hóc Môn, Saigon, Cochinchina, French Indochina
- Party: Communist Party of Vietnam

Hà Huy Tập (24 April 1906 – 28 August 1941) was a Vietnamese revolutionary and the third General Secretary of the Central Committee of the Indochinese Communist Party (ICP).

== Early life ==
Hà Huy Tập was born Hà Huy Khiêm on April 24, 1906 in Cẩm Xuyên, Hà Tĩnh Province. He was the second child in a family of 5 siblings.

He was taught basic Confucianism by his father at a young age. He also attended elementary school in Hà Tĩnh. After finishing elementary school in 1919 he entered Quốc học Huế. In 1923, he graduated with honors in Diplomacy and was sent to teach at Nha Trang Primary School (presently known as Nguyễn Văn Trỗi High School) until 1926.

== Revolutionary activity ==
Influenced by his father, during his time as an elementary teacher, in addition to teaching the young, he also taught laborers and the poor outside the class. He paid for books for his poor students out of his salary. His activities were endorsed by a number of young intellectuals and introduced him to a political organization called Hội Phục Việt (the Vietnam Society), which later became the Tân Việt Revolutionary Party.

The Tân Việt Revolutionary Party's calls for "breaking the empire" and building a society of equality and charity opposed the vision of the French on Vietnam at the time. Thus, in mid-1926, he was sacked and expelled from Nha Trang by the colonial authorities. In August 1926, he taught in Cao Xuân Dục primary school in Nghệ An. In March 1927, he moved to Saigon to work, make a living, and teach in An Nam Nguyen school. He also continued teaching poor laborers, thereby propagating the patriotic spirit and the revolutionary idea of independence.

Due to these activities, in January 1928, he was fired again from An Nam school but continued to teach and propagate the revolution from Bà Rịa, Biên Hòa, Sài Gòn, Gia Định.

In July 1928, he went to the North, tasked with communicating with the Vietnam Revolutionary Youth Association in an effort to unite all anti-colonial organizations into one entity. In December 1928, he was sent to Guangzhou to attend a training session of the Vietnam Revolutionary Youth Association. Impressed by the ideas of Nguyễn Ái Quốc and the work of Đường Kách Mệnh, he became active in the Vietnam Revolutionary Youth Association.

On July 19, 1929, he went to the Soviet Union, studying at the Communist International University of the Communist International in Moscow, under the pseudonym Sinichkin（Синичкин). In late 1929, he was admitted to the Communist Party of the Soviet Union (Bolshevik). During this time he drafted the "Indochinese Communist Party Action Plan" and "The History of the Communist Movement in Indochina".

In April 1934, he graduated from the University and returned to Vietnam. He was arrested by the French on his way, then deported to Belgium, then went to China, where he was appointed by the Communist International to join the Foreign Brigades of the Indochinese Communist Party, led by Lê Hồng Phong as the Secretary. From 16 to 21 June 1934, the congress of the Indochinese Communist Party Committee and representatives of the Party organizations in the country were formed, consisted of Lê Hồng Phong, Hà Huy Tập, Nguyễn Văn Dựt, Nguyễn Văn Tham and Trần Văn Chấn. The conference adopted the Political Resolution and the Resolution on Organizational Matters.

In March 1935, at the First Party Congress in Macau, Lê Hồng Phong was elected General Secretary. Ha Huy Tap was elected to the Central Executive Committee and was appointed as the Secretary of the Overseas Command. In July 1936, the Overseas Committee of the Party held the first conference, the Central Committee sent him back to repatriate the Party Central Committee and held the post of General Secretary from July 26. He directed the L'Avant garde (1937), the People's Party (1938) in the name of "labor and people" in Cochinchina.

From September 3 to September 5, 1937, the Central Conference met in Ba Dinh, Gia Dinh, where he reported on the leadership of the party from the first Congress to 1937. On March 30, 1938, together with his predecessor Le Hong Phong, he chaired the third meeting of the Party Central Committee at Ba Diem. At this conference, he resigned as General Secretary, but still joined the Central Committee of the Party. His successor was Nguyễn Văn Cừ.

On May 1, 1938, he was arrested while attending International Labor Day in Saigon. He was expelled from Cochinchina and sent to his hometown. By March 30, 1940, he was arrested and sent to Cochinchina for trial. On October 25 of that year, he was sentenced by the French colonial government to five years in prison. At this trial, he and his comrades were represented by young lawyer Nguyễn Văn Huyền, who later served as the Vice President of the Republic of Vietnam, as a defense lawyer.

On March 25, 1941, the French government changed his sentence to death for "being responsible for the spirit of the 1940 Cochinchina uprising". Also sentenced to death were Nguyễn Văn Cừ, Võ Văn Tần, and Nguyễn Thị Minh Khai. He stated: "I have nothing to regret, if I am alive, I will continue."

On August 28, 1941, he was executed, along with several other revolutionaries, by the French government at the Garbage Department (now Hoc Mon Hospital, Ho Chi Minh City). The last letter he sent to his family said, "Suppose I was destined to die... Dear my friends and my family... Please do not consider me as the dead or the mourned, instead deem me as a living person, but just being away from home for an indefinite period of time."
