= Võ Văn Tần =

Vietnamese revolutionary (1894–1941)

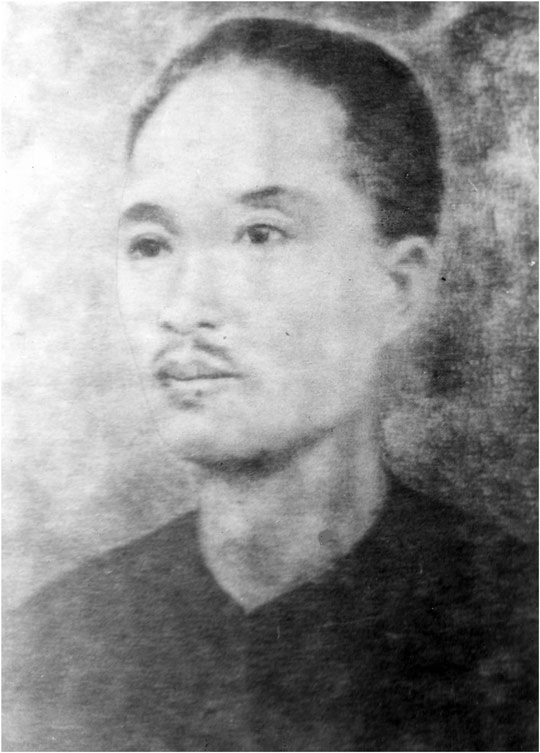
Võ Văn Tần

Võ Văn Tần (21 August 1894 – 28 August 1941) was a Vietnamese revolutionary and a senior leader of the Indochina Communist Party during the period 1930-1940. He was executed by French firing squad at the Giồng T-road junction (ngã ba Giồng) in Hóc Môn District along with Nguyễn Thị Minh Khai and Nguyễn Văn Cừ in August 1941.

== Biography ==
Võ Văn Tần was born to a poor farmer family on August 21, 1891, in Đức Hòa district, Chợ Lớn province (now in Long An province), and was the older brother of Võ Văn Ngân. Growing up, he went to Saigon to work as a rickshaw puller to make a living.

He joined local struggles early, participating in Nguyễn An Ninh's organization, then transferring to the An Nam Communist Party organization in 1929, where he became thee First District Party Committee Secretary of Đức Hòa district in 1930, organizing peasant revolts in Đức Hòa. He was sentenced to death in absentia by the French colonialists on June 4, 1930. He then became Secretary of the Chợ Lớn Provincial Party Committee (1931), Secretary of the Gia Định Provincial Party Committee (1932). Starting in 1936, the organization led the revolutionary movement in Saigon and the provinces of Cochinchina. He served as Secretary of the Southern Party Committee and member of the Party Central Committee (1937 - 1940). He attended the 6th Conference (November 1939) of the Party Central Committee meeting in Bà Điểm, Hóc Môn District.

He was arrested by the French colonialists on April 21, 1940, in Tan Xuan commune, Hóc Môn district and then executed by firing squad in Hóc Môn on August 28, 1941, along with a number of other revolutionaries and Communist leaders.

== Memorials ==
Today, his name is given to many streets in Ho Chi Minh City and many other localities throughout the country. In his hometown, his name was given to Võ Văn Tần junior high school, Quarter 3, Đức Hòa town, Đức Hòa district, Long An province. At the Đức Hòa Crossroads historical site, the Võ Văn Tần monument is placed in the park named after him.
