= Đông Thạnh =

Đông Thạnh Xã Đông Thạnh Thới Tam Thôn, Nhị Bình
- Commune
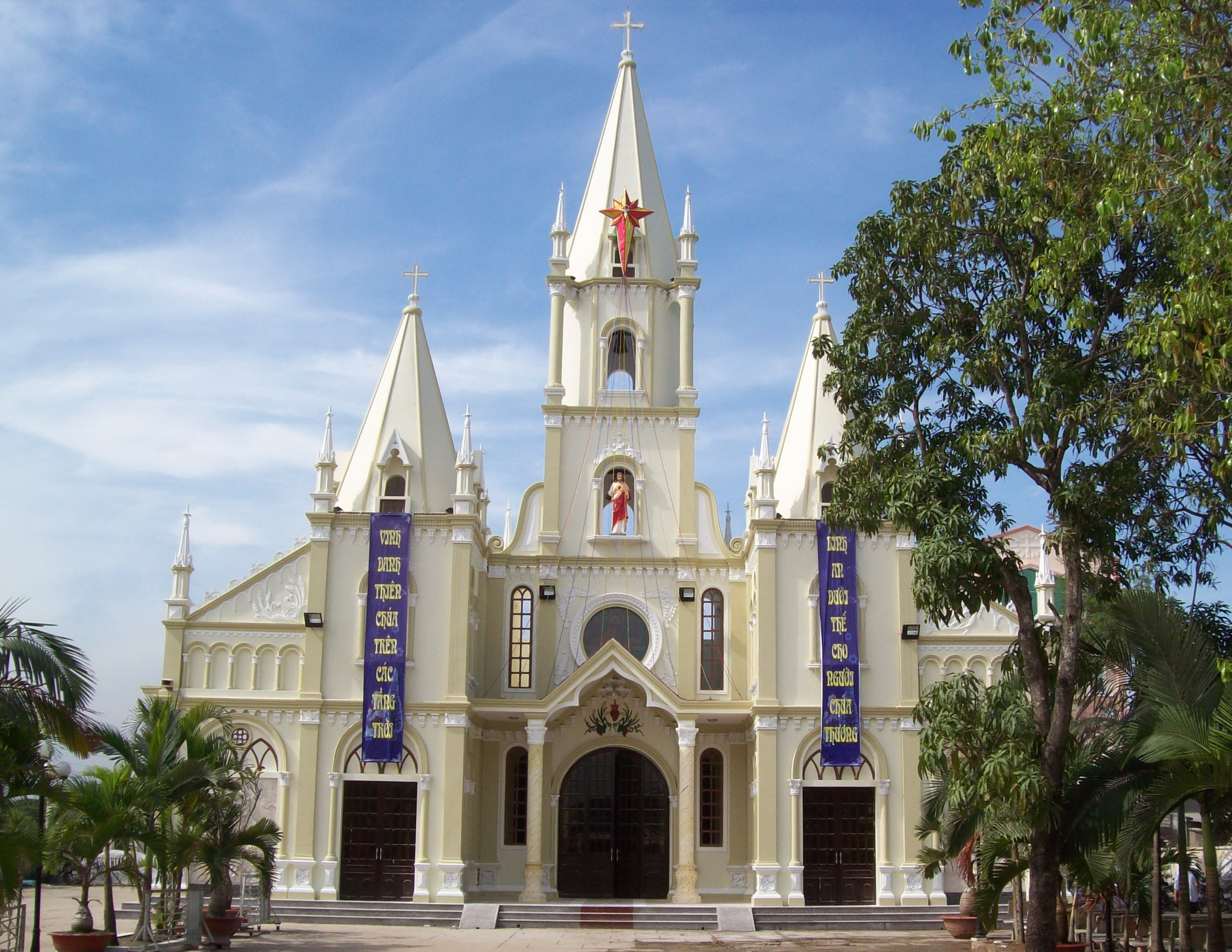
- Tân Đông Church
- Interactive map of Đông Thạnh
- Coordinates: 10°54′32″N 106°38′39″E
- Country: Vietnam
- Municipality: Ho Chi Minh City
- Established: June 16, 2025

Area
  - Total: 11.64 sq mi (30.16 km^{2})

Population (2024)
  - Total: 190,400
  - Density: 16,350/sq mi (6,313/km^{2})
- Time zone: UTC+07:00 (Indochina Time)
- Administrative code: 27568

Đông Thạnh (Vietnamese: Xã Đông Thạnh) is a commune of Ho Chi Minh City, Vietnam. It is one of the 168 new wards, communes and special zones of the city following the reorganization in 2025.

== History ==
On June 16, 2025, the National Assembly Standing Committee issued Resolution No. 1685/NQ-UBTVQH15 on the arrangement of commune-level administrative units of Ho Chi Minh City in 2025 (effective from June 16, 2025). Accordingly, the entire land area and population of Thới Tam Thôn, Đông Thạnh and Nhị Bình communes of the former Hóc Môn district will be integrated into a new commune named Đông Thạnh (Clause 130, Article 1).
