= Cẩm Xuyên district =

Coordinates: 18.250°N 106.000°E

Cẩm Xuyên district Huyện Cẩm Xuyên
- District
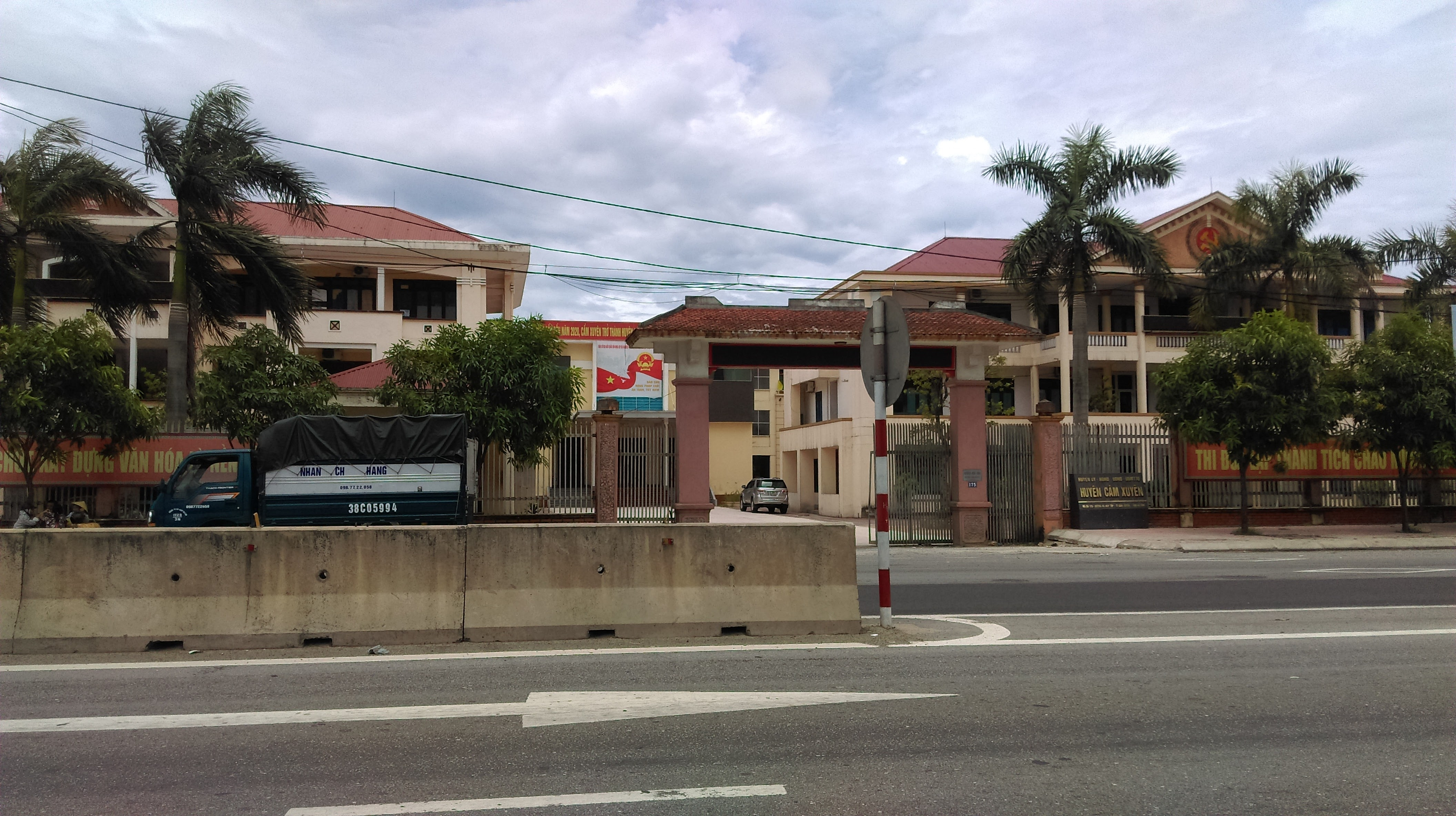
- People's Committee of Cẩm Xuyên

- Seal
- Interactive map of Cẩm Xuyên district
- Country: Vietnam
- Region: North Central Coast
- Province: Hà Tĩnh
- Capital: Cẩm Xuyên

Area
  - Total: 246 sq mi (636 km^{2})

Population (2003)
  - Total: 153,523
- Time zone: UTC+07:00 (Indochina Time)

Cẩm Xuyên is a rural district of Hà Tĩnh province in the North Central Coast region of Vietnam. As of 2003 the district had a population of 153,523. The district covers an area of 636 km^{2} (246 sq mi). The district capital lies at Cẩm Xuyên.

Notable people from the district include Hà Huy Tập (1906 - executed Saigon 1941), third General Secretary of the Central Committee of the Communist Party of Vietnam.
