= Provincial Municipal Courts of Vietnam =

Provincial Municipal Courts of Vietnam are lower level courts in Vietnam's judicial system. These courts are essentially provincial courts and report directly to the central government in Hanoi.

Other courts in Vietnam:

- Supreme People's Court of Vietnam
- Local Courts of Vietnam
- Military Courts of Vietnam
