= Lê Hồng Phong =

Vietnamese politician (1902–1942)

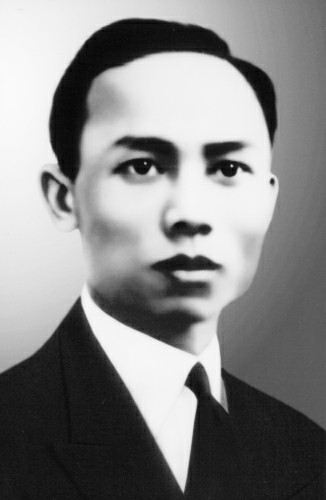

General Secretary of the Central Committee of the Indochinese Communist Party de facto
- In office 27 October 1931 – 26 July 1936
- Preceded by: Trần Phú
- Succeeded by: Hà Huy Tập

Personal details
- Born: Lê Huy Doãn; 6 September 1902 Nghệ An Province, French Indochina
- Died: 6 September 1942 (aged 40) Côn Đảo, French Indochina
- Party: Communist Party of Vietnam
- Spouse: Nguyễn Thị Minh Khai
- Children: 1

Lê Hồng Phong (6 September 1902 – 6 September 1942) was the second leader of the Communist Party of Vietnam (CPV); he led the party through the office of General Secretary of the Overseas Executive Committee of the Indochinese Communist Party. The Overseas Executive Committee was the only body of the CPV left intact after increased repression by the French authorities in Indochina. His wife, Nguyễn Thị Minh Khai, also played an important role in the Party in its early stages.

== Early life ==
He was born on 6 September 1902 to a poor family in Nghệ An, and given the name Lê Huy Doãn. Orphaned at an early age, he was nonetheless able to study Chinese and French in his village. His teacher changed his name to Lê Văn Duyện.

At 16, he applied to work as a salesman in Vinh to earn more money for his family. Some time later, he began work at the Ben Thuy match factory and was dismissed for mobilizing workers to fight for their rights against their exploitative employers. At that point he became a professional revolutionary.

== Overseas activities ==
In January 1924, he and 10 youths, including his village friend Phạm Hồng Thái, went to Thailand, then crossed to Guangzhou, China. Here, he, Lê Hồng Sơn, and Lê Quang Đạt met Nguyễn Ái Quốc and was admitted to the revolutionary organization Tâm Tâm Xã (the Heart-to-Heart Association), which later was transformed into the Vietnamese Revolutionary Youth League, of which Lê Hồng Phong was a core member.

In the summer of 1925, he, Lê Hồng Sơn and Lê Quang Đạt enrolled in the Whampoa Military Academy. One year later, he was sent to study at the Guangzhou Air Force School. There, in February 1926, with the recommendation of Nguyễn Ái Quốc, he was admitted to the Chinese Communist Party. In August 1927, he and a group of young Vietnamese volunteers studying at the Guangzhou Air Force School went to the Soviet Air Force School to continue their studies.

Thanks to his good health, he was the only one in the group to continue studying at the Soviet Air Force School. From October 1926 to October 1927, he attended the Military Theory School in Leningrad. From December 1927 to November 1928, he attended the 2nd Air Force Academy in Borisoglebsk. From December 1928, he attended the Communist International University of the Communist International in Moscow with the alias Litvinov (Литвинов). After graduation, he joined the Red Army with the rank of Lieutenant Colonel.

== Establishment of the Overseas Commission ==
At the end of 1931, with the name of Vương Nhật Dân, he returned to China. At that time communist organizations in Indochina were violently suppressed by the colonial government. In 1932, under the direction of the Communist International, he and some other comrades sought to contact the Party organization in the country to revive the movement and program the party's actions after the Party had suffered heavy losses.

In June 1932, the Indochinese Communist Party issued a Program of Action recognized by the Comintern. Under the direction of the Comintern, in March 1934, in Macau, the Overseas Commission of the Indochinese Communist Party was established, in which he served as Secretary. As the Central Committee was almost paralyzed, the Overseas Command, together with the Provisional Central Executive Committee, had the task of communicating between the Indochinese Communist Party and the Communist International and other Communist parties. They reorganized the training of cadres for the country, launched the Bolshevik Magazine, the theoretical organ of the Party Central Committee, gathered and restored Party bases, and prepared to convene the first Party Congress.

From 16 to 21 June 1934, the Conference of the Overseas Commission of the Indochinese Communist Party and representatives of the Party organizations in the country, including Lê Hồng Phong, Hà Huy Tập, Nguyễn Văn Dựt, Nguyễn Văn Tham and Trần Văn Chấn, was organized. The conference adopted a Political Resolution and the Resolution on Organizational Matters which detailed the organizational structure and tasks of the Overseas Commission of the Indochina Communist Party:

1. The Overseas Commission consists of 5 people (3 people appointed by the Communist International and 2 people appointed by the Central Committee of the Indochina Communist Party). The Overseas Commission elects the Standing Committee and its secretary. The term of existence of the Overseas Commission is determined by the Communist International. Plenary conferences of the Overseas Commission are convened at least every three months.
2. The Overseas Commission is the Party's representative in relations and communications with the Communist International and sister Communist Parties.
3. The Overseas Commission directs the general political policy of the Party Central Committee. The Commission has the right to appoint delegates to participate in work and inspect all work of party committees at all levels in the country.
4. The most important resolutions of the Central Government must be discussed and agreed upon with the Overseas Commission. In case the Central Committee of the Indochina Communist Party does not agree with the Overseas Commission, the Central Committee has the right to appeal the resolution to the Communist International. Before the Communist International decides on any controversial issue, the Central Committee is responsible for implementing the directives of the Overseas Commission.
5. In case the Party Central Committee is broken and out of contact and to avoid permanent loss of leadership, the Party Committees (Northern Vietnam, Central Vietnam, Cochinchina, Laos, Cambodia) must contact the Overseas Commission. In case the Central Committee fails, the Overseas Commission can replace the Central Committee to directly lead all party organizations in the country...

As Secretary of the Overseas Commission, Lê Hồng Phong was the de facto General Secretary of the Indochina Communist Party. After the Central Executive Committee was established domestically, the Overseas Commission had its own tasks and membership.

== Activities from 1935 until his death ==
In March 1935, at the First Congress of the Party in Macau, Lê Hồng Phong was elected General Secretary. In July 1935, Lê Hồng Phong led the Party delegation to the 7th Congress of the Communist International in Moscow. The Congress recognized the Party as the official Communist Party and elected him a member of the Executive Committee of the Communist International. In January 1936, he went to China and convened the Central Party Congress in Shanghai in July 1936. On 10 November 1937, he returned to Vietnam to work under the name La Anh.

In March 1938, he attended the Central Conference in Hóc Môn, which decided to establish the "Indochinese Democratic Front". On June 22, 1939, he was arrested for the first time in Saigon and sentenced to 6 months in prison and 3 years of house arrest and deported to his hometown of Nghệ An. On February 6, 1940, he was arrested for the second time, sentenced to five years in prison and exiled to Saigon and Côn Đảo.

On September 6, 1942, he died while in prison in Côn Đảo on his 40th birthday. Before dying, he sent a message: "Hello all comrades. Please tell the Party: Until the last moment, Lê Hồng Phong still believed in the glorious victory of the revolution."

== Family ==
He married Nguyễn Thị Minh Khai, a female comrade who studied at Phương Đông University. The two had a daughter, named Lê Nguyễn Hồng Minh.

Lê Hồng Phong had been married before meeting Nguyễn Thị Minh Khai. However, because he had long since left his homeland to work, his wife had started a new family.

He was once a brother-in-law with General Võ Nguyên Giáp.

== Honors ==
His name was given to streets in Hanoi (connecting Đội Cấn with Điện Biên Phủ and connecting Tô Hiệu with Lê Lợi in the Hà Đông district), Ho Chi Minh City (connecting Hoàng Dư Khương with Trần Hưng Đạo), Hai Phong (connecting Đà Nẵng Road with Cát Bi airport), Nha Trang (connecting October 23 Street with Phước Long Street), Vinh (connecting Nguyễn Thái Học street with Phong Định Cảng Street, adjacent to Nguyễn Thị Minh Khai Street), Cần Thơ (connecting Cách mạng tháng Tám Street with National Highway 91), Đà Lat (connecting Trần Phú Street with Pasteur Street), Tuy Hòa (connecting Hùng Vương Street with Lê Duẩn Street), Quy Nhon, Uông Bí (from Nguyễn Văn Cừ Street to bordering Vàng Danh ward railway), Vũng Tàu City (connecting Lê Lợi with Thùy Vân), Pleiku City (Connecting Lý Thái Tổ with Hoàng Văn Thụ and some other roads). His name is also given to two High schools for the gifted in Nam Định and Ho Chi Minh City.

== See also ==
- Lê Hồng Phong High School
