= Local Courts of Vietnam =

Local Courts of Vietnam or People's Courts deal with legal issues at the district precinct levels. These courts report to provincial or municipal governments.

Matters dealt by this court include:

- labour disputes
- individual disputes

Other courts in Vietnam:

- Supreme People's Court of Vietnam
- Provincial Municipal Courts of Vietnam
- Military Courts of Vietnam
