= Military Courts of Vietnam =

Military Courts of Vietnam (Vietnamese: Tòa án quân sự Việt Nam) deal with criminal matters within the Vietnam People's Army. They are part of the court system in Vietnam:

- Supreme People's Court of Vietnam
- Local Courts of Vietnam
- Provincial Municipal Courts of Vietnam

Military courts operate at various levels in the VPA, with the highest being the Central Military Tribunal, an affiliated institution which is subordinate to the People's Court.
