= Nguyễn Văn Cừ =

Vietnamese revolutionary (1912–1941)

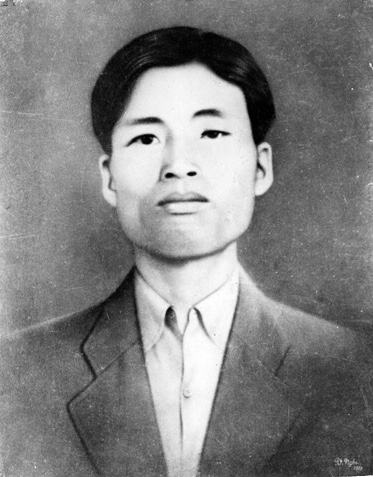

General Secretary of the Central Committee of the Indochinese Communist Party
- In office 30 March 1938 – 9 November 1940
- Preceded by: Hà Huy Tập
- Succeeded by: Trường Chinh

Personal details
- Born: 9 July 1912 Bắc Ninh Province, French Indochina
- Died: 28 August 1941 (aged 29) Saigon, French Indochina
- Party: Communist Party of Vietnam

Nguyễn Văn Cừ (9 July 1912 – 28 August 1941) was a Vietnamese revolutionary, a descendant of Nguyễn Trãi. He served as the fourth General Secretary of the Central Committee of the Communist Party of Vietnam (CPV) 30 March 1938 – 9 November 1940.

== Early years ==
Nguyễn Văn Cừ was born into a Confucian family in Phù Khê commune (now Phù Khê ward, Từ Sơn city, Bắc Ninh province). His 17th great-grandfather was Nguyễn Trãi.

In 1927, he went to Hanoi to study high school at the Protectorate School and participated in many patriotic activities of students. In May, he was expelled by the colonial government and had to go to Hà Lỗ village (Đông Anh) to teach.

== Revolutionary career ==
In early 1928, he joined the Vietnamese Revolutionary Youth League. In August, he was arrested and detained for 12 days. After being released from prison, he was introduced by Secretary of the Bắc Ninh Provincial Party Committee Ngô Gia Tự to Secretary of the Haiphong Party Committee Nguyễn Đức Cảnh, who was sent to work at the Vàng Danh mine (Uông Bí) under the alias Phùng.

On June 17, 1929, Nguyễn Văn Cừ was admitted to the first Indochina Communist Party cell in Hanoi. In September, he was assigned to the Haiphong City Party Committee, then went to work at Mạo Khê mine under the alias Phùng Ngọc Tường. In 1930, the Communist Party of Vietnam was born, and he was assigned by Nguyễn Đức Cảnh to work in mines in Quảng Yên in Hai Ninh Province. In October, he was appointed by the Northern Region Party Committee to be the Representative of the Regional Party Committee next to the Hồng Gai - Uông Bí Special Region Party Committee led by Vũ Văn Hiếu as Secretary. On February 15, 1931, on the way from Cẩm Phả to Hòn Gai, he was arrested by the French colonial authorities, sentenced to hard labor, and exiled to Côn Đảo.

In November 1936, he was released and returned to secret activities in Hanoi. Nguyễn Văn Cừ focused on the work of restoring the Party base and promoting the people's agitational activities and succeeded in re-establishing the Northern Party Committee and becoming a member of the Standing Committee of the Northern Party Committee. In September 1937, Nguyễn Văn Cừ was appointed to the Standing Committee of the Central Committee of the Indochina Communist Party at the Hóc Môn conference in Gia Định Province. At the Central Executive Committee Conference held on March 29, 1938 he was elected General Secretary at the age of 26.

At the Central Executive Committee Conference in March 1938, Nguyễn Văn Cừ and the Party Central Committee developed a Resolution "reviewing the work, outlining the Party's tasks in the new period, determining the issue of establishing a Front. Unified democracy is a central task of the Party in the current period." Right after the Central Executive Committee Conference, he immediately promoted the establishment of the Indochina Democratic Front, following the Comintern's promotion of popular front politics.

Under his direct direction, the November 1939 Central Executive Committee Conference Resolution decided important issues in shifting revolutionary strategy. The Party advocates temporarily shelved the slogan of land reform and proposing instead the slogan of confiscating land from imperialists and landlords who betray national interests, opposing high rents and combatting usury while temporarily shelving the slogan of establishing a Soviet of workers, farmers, and soldiers, replaced by the establishment of a democratic republican government and the establishment of the Indochina Anti-Imperial People's Front.

On January 17, 1940, Nguyễn Văn Cừ, Lê Duẩn and Vu Van Hieu (with documents stating his name as "Nguyen Van Hieu") were arrested in Saigon with many important documents and sentenced to prison.

After the 1940 Cochinchina uprising, he was accused by the French colonialists of drafting the "Resolution to establish the Indochina Anti-Imperial National United Front", "advocating violence" and being "a person responsible for the Cochinchina uprising" and sentenced to death.

On August 28, 1941, Nguyễn Văn Cừ was shot at the Giồng T-road junction (ngã ba Giồng) in Hóc Môn District along with Nguyễn Thị Minh Khai and Võ Văn Tần.
