= Hóc Môn =

Hóc Môn Xã Hóc Môn Tân Thới Nhì, Tân Thới Đông, Tân Thới Tây, Tân Thới Trung
- Commune
- Interactive map of Hóc Môn
- Coordinates: 10°53′19″N 106°35′45″E
- Country: Vietnam
- Municipality: Ho Chi Minh City
- Established: June 16, 2025

Area
  - Total: 6.34 sq mi (16.43 km^{2})

Population (2024)
  - Total: 93,323
  - Density: 14,710/sq mi (5,680/km^{2})
- Time zone: UTC+07:00 (Indochina Time)
- Administrative code: 27559

Hóc Môn (Vietnamese: Xã Hóc Môn) is a commune of Ho Chi Minh City, Vietnam. It is one of the 168 new wards, communes and special zones of the city following the reorganization in 2025.

== History ==
On June 16, 2025, the National Assembly Standing Committee issued Resolution No. 1685/NQ-UBTVQH15 on the arrangement of commune-level administrative units of Ho Chi Minh City in 2025 (effective from June 16, 2025). Accordingly, the entire land area and population of Hóc Môn township and Tân Hiệp, Tân Xuân communes of the former Hóc Môn district will be integrated into a new commune named Hóc Môn (Clause 131, Article 1).
