= Nguyễn Thị Minh Khai =

Vietnamese politician

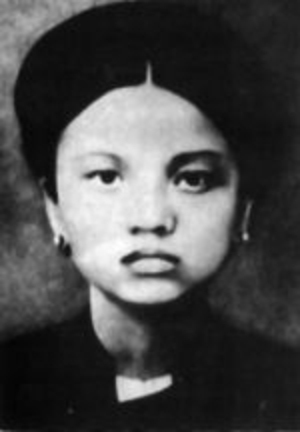
- Born: 1 November 1910; Vinh, Nghệ An province, French Indochina
- Died: 28 August 1941 (aged 30); Hóc Môn, Cochinchina, French Indochina
- Cause of death: Execution by firing squad
- Other name: Nguyễn Thị Vịnh
- Occupations: Revolutionist, politician
- Political party: New Revolutionary Party of Vietnam
- Spouse: Lê Hồng Phong
- Children: 1

Nguyễn Thị Minh Khai (1 November 1910 – 28 August 1941) was a Vietnamese revolutionary and a leader of the Indochinese Communist Party during the 1930s.

== Early life and education ==
Nguyễn Thị Minh Khai was born Nguyễn Thị Vịnh on 1 November 1910 in Vinh, Nghệ An province, Vietnam.

Her father, Nguyễn Huy Bình, also known as Hàn Bình, was born in Hanoi. He had learnt French but, due to failing the civil service examinations, chose to work as a railway official in Vinh. Her mother, Đậu Thị Thư, was a petty shopkeeper from Đức Thọ, Hà Tĩnh province.

Her father frequently permitted her to retain banned documents in an upstairs room at the train station. When Minh Khai grew more engaged in her revolutionary activities, her mother supported her financially on her frequent visits to different provinces.

== Revolutionary career ==
In 1927, she co-founded the New Revolutionary Party of Vietnam which was a predecessor of the Communist Party of Vietnam. She was considered as one of the prominent female members of the Indochinese Communist Party (ICP). In April 1930, she was delegated to Hong Kong and became a secretary for Hồ Chí Minh (at the time known as Nguyễn Ái Quốc) in the office of the Orient Bureau of the Comintern. In April 1931, Minh Khai was detained by the British administration in Hong Kong. The British colonial government initially planned to turn her over to the French authorities. However, her Cantonese fluency enabled her to avoid being handed over to the French but instead, she was imprisoned in several Kuomintang jails in China from 1931 to 1934. In 1934, she and Lê Hồng Phong were voted to be attendees in the Seventh Congress of Comintern in Moscow. Later she married Lê.

In 1936, she returned to Vietnam and became the top leader of the communists in Saigon. She was seized by the French colonial government in 1940 and was executed by firing squad the next year. Her husband Lê had been jailed in June 1939, and later died in the tiger cages at Poulo Condore prison in September 1942.

== Legacy ==
Today, Nguyễn Thị Minh Khai is honoured as a revolutionary martyr by the Communist Party of Vietnam, and some roads, schools, and administrative units in Vietnam are named after her. Some of these include the Nguyễn Thị Minh Khai urban ward in Bắc Kạn, and Nguyễn Thị Minh Khai High School.

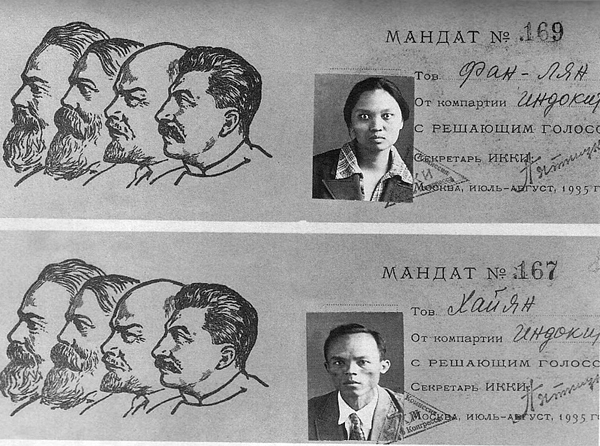
Her Delegate's Card at the 1935 COMINTERN's 7th Congress in Moscow, USSR. She was a delegate representing the Indochinese Communist Party.

== See also ==
- Lý Tự Trọng
- Nguyễn An Ninh
- Nguyễn Thần Hiến
