= Tiếng gọi thanh niên =

Student march and national anthem of South Vietnam

Information
- Anthem of the Vanguard Youth
- Lyric: Lyric 1: (1941); Lưu Hữu Phước; Mai Văn Bộ; Ngô Đình Diệm (lyrics revised in 1955); Lyric 2: (1943); Lê Khắc Thiền; Đặng Ngọc Tốt; Lyric 3: (1945); Hoàng Mai Lưu
- Music: Lưu Hữu Phước
- Date: 1939

Others
- Original version: Marche des Étudiants
- Alternative name: Tiếng gọi thanh niên ("Call to the Youths"); Tiếng gọi sinh viên ("Call to the Students")

Tiếng gọi công dân
English: "Call to the Citizens"
- Thanh Niên Hành Khúc
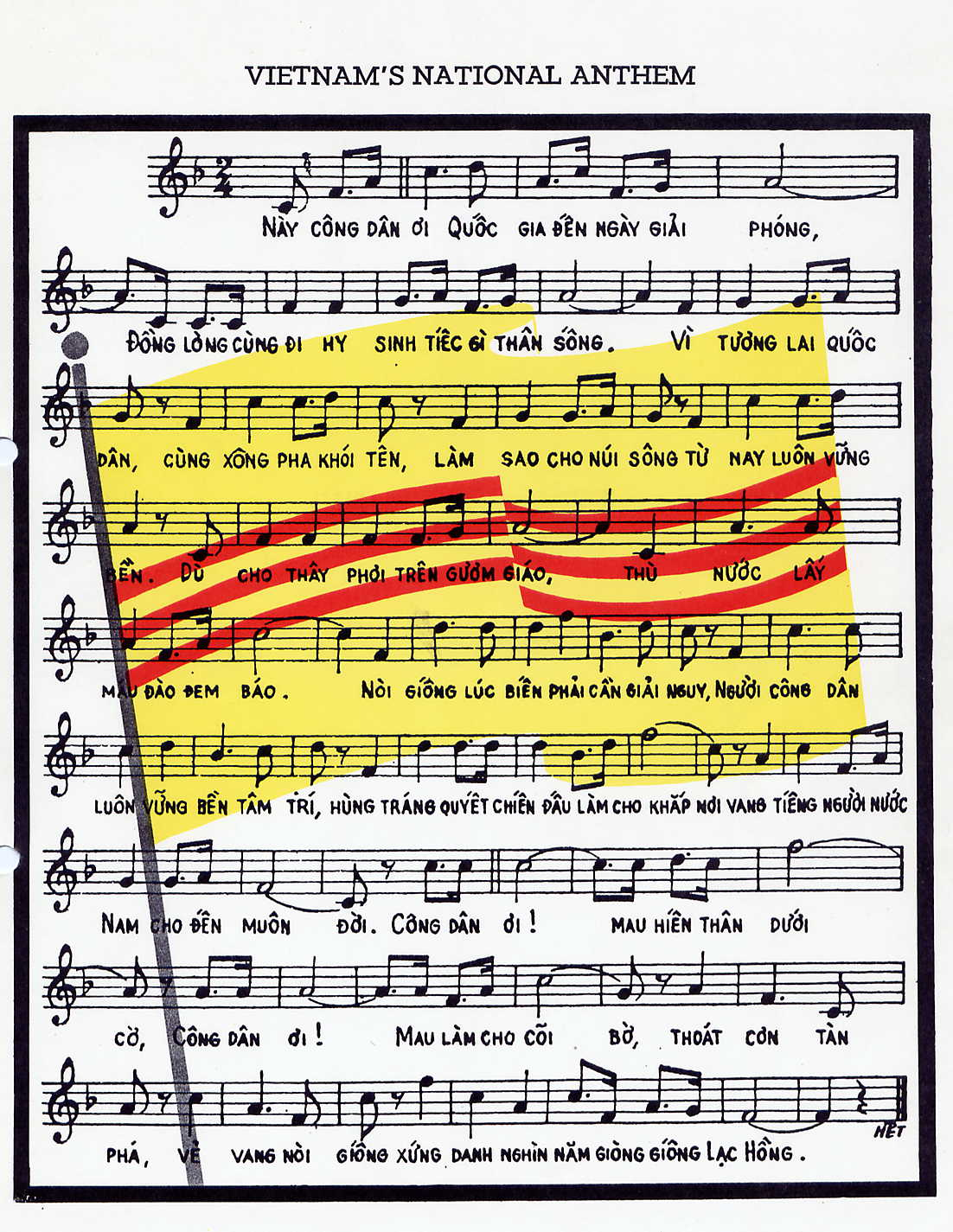
- A sheet music notation of "Call to the Citizens", with the South Vietnamese flag in the background (recorded since 1973)
- Former national anthem of State of Vietnam; South Vietnam
- Also known as: "Sinh Viên Hành Khúc" (English: "Song of the Students") "National Anthem of the Republic of Vietnam"
- Lyrics: Lưu Hữu Phước, Mai Văn Bộ (original lyric), 1939; Ngô Đình Diệm (revised lyrics), 1955
- Music: Lưu Hữu Phước, 1939
- Adopted: 1949 (by the State of Vietnam); 1955 (by South Vietnam)
- Relinquished: 1955 (by the State of Vietnam); 1975 (by South Vietnam)
- Preceded by: "La Marseillaise"
- Succeeded by: "Giải phóng miền Nam"

Audio sample
- "Tiếng Gọi Công Dân" (Vocals): file; help

Tiếng gọi thanh niên, or Thanh niên hành khúc (Saigon: [tʰan niəŋ hân xúk], "March of the Youths"), and originally the March of the Students (Vietnamese: Sinh Viên Hành Khúc, French: La Marche des Étudiants), is a famous song of the Vietnamese musician Lưu Hữu Phước.

Its lyrics were revised to become the national anthem of the State of Vietnam from 1949 to 1955 and later the Republic of Vietnam (South Vietnam) from 1955 to 1975, with the name Tiếng gọi công dân ("Call to the Citizens"). This move was strongly protested by the original author Lưu Hữu Phước, who was culture minister of the Việt Cộng-led Provisional Revolutionary Government during the Vietnam War.

== History ==
=== Original version ===
The anthem was originally named La Marche des Étudiants (March of the Students), composed by Lưu Hữu Phước and written by Mai Văn Bộ in late 1939, and first adopted by a student club. In 1941, it became the anthem of the Indochina Students General Association, Phước renamed the anthem as Tiếng gọi thanh niên (Call to the Youths), the lyrics was rewritten in Vietnamese and divided into three verses. The first verse was written by Lưu Hữu Phước and Mai Văn Bộ in 1941, and secretly spread until 1945, the second verse (Tiếng gọi sinh viên, Call to the Students) was written by Lê Khắc Thiền and Đặng Ngọc Tốt in late 1941, and published in 1943, the third verse was written by Hoàng Mai Lưu on April 4, 1945, and published before the August Revolution. In 1945 it became the anthem of the Vanguard Youth, the lyrics were slightly modified and known as Tiếng gọi thanh niên or Thanh niên hành khúc.

=== Thanh niên hành khúc (1948–1956) and Tiếng gọi công dân (1956–1975) ===
In 1948, the Provisional Central Government of Vietnam adopted the song as its national anthem. The song was later modified, changing its name to Tiếng gọi công dân (Call to the Citizens) or Công dân hành khúc (March of the Citizens), and became the official national anthem of South Vietnam. Thanh niên hành khúc was first adopted as the national anthem by the Provisional Central Government of Vietnam (1948–1949) on 14 June 1948, and it was inherited as a national anthem by the State of Vietnam (1949–1955) and the Republic of Vietnam (1955–1975). The lyrics of Thanh niên hành khúc were revised by former President Ngo Dinh Diem in 1956.

The composer Lưu Hữu Phước opposed South Vietnam's use of the song and in 1949 he wrote a letter in protest; later the Voice of Vietnam sporadically broadcast Lưu Hữu Phước's criticisms.

=== After the war (1975–present) ===
After 1975, the original version and name (Tiếng gọi thanh niên) of the song was performed as the official version in the Socialist Republic of Vietnam.

Anti-communist refugees and expatriates continued to use the revised version and dubbed it as "Anthem of Free Vietnam".
