= Communist Vietnam =

Communist Vietnam may refer to:

- Democratic Republic of Vietnam, also known as "North Vietnam"
- Provisional Revolutionary Government of the Republic of South Vietnam, South Vietnamese government after the Fall of Saigon
- Socialist Republic of Vietnam, also known commonly as "Vietnam"
- Communist Party of Vietnam
- Viet Cong
