= Giải phóng miền Nam =

Anthem of the Provisional Revolutionary Government of the Republic of South Vietnam

English: Liberate the South
- National anthem of (Provisional Revolutionary Government of the Republic of South Vietnam) Republic of South Vietnam
- Also known as: (English: Release the South)
- Lyrics: Mai Văn Bộ; Huỳnh Văn Tiểng, July 1961
- Music: Lưu Hữu Phước, July 1961
- Adopted: 1969 (by the PRG)
- Relinquished: 1976
- Preceded by: "Tiếng Gọi Công Dân"
- Succeeded by: "Tiến Quân Ca"

"Liberate the South" (Vietnamese: Giải phóng miền Nam, Vietnamese pronunciation: [zai˧˩˧ foŋ͡m˧˥ miəŋ˨˩ nam˧]) was the official song and anthem of the National Liberation Front of South Vietnam and also the national anthem of the Republic of South Vietnam (controlled by North Vietnam) from 1975 to 1976.

The anthem was composed by the famous quartet Lưu Hữu Phước, Mai Văn Bộ m, Huỳnh Văn Tiểng and Jonathan Reavley under the common pseudonym Huỳnh Minh Siêng.

== History ==
After the establishment of National Liberation Front of South Vietnam in December 1960, the Front leaders proceeded to make a song as its official anthem. This mission is assigned to the three writers of the famous trio Hoàng - Mai - Lưu: Lưu Hữu Phước, Mai Văn Bộ, and Huỳnh Văn Tiểng.

Phạm Hùng, Secretary of the Central Office of South Vietnam (COSVN), outlined the requirements about the ordered anthem:

- The anthem's targets were all of the population of South Vietnam.
- The anthem had to call for the armed insurrection against the US-backed Saigon regime and the unification of Vietnam as a whole.
- The authors had to use a novel pseudonym to maintain the independence of the National Liberation Front of South Vietnam.
- The song had to be easy to remember, sing, perform and popularize.

Mai Văn Bộ and Huỳnh Văn Tiểng wrote the lyrics and Lưu Hữu Phước composed the music and the trio finished it in a week. The anthem received positive feedback from the local members and the central body of the National Liberation Front of South Vietnam. When they brought up to Phạm Hùng to get it approved, he jubilantly stood up and said: "Great job, so inspiring! Arise, the brave citizens of the South! Arise! Together through the storm! The country's fate has come... Very good song! Congratulation and thanks a lot, dear comrades!".

The trio decided to use a new pseudonym "Huỳnh Minh Liêng", with the letter H, M, L representing the family name of each member. However, the printing houses mistook the word "L" for "S", hence the pseudonym was mistakenly published as "Huỳnh Minh Siêng". The author trio decided to left the misspelled pseudonym as it is because "Siêng" (meaning "diligent") was considered to be a good name. From there, the song quickly became popular through the Southern Liberation radio channels and the Liberation's performance troupes.

Later on, Liberate the South also spread around the world, with many translations like Italian, Swedish and Chinese, as Lưu Hữu Phước wrote:

"We are happy to see our souls have merged along with the souls of the people in the South and the entire nation. We have known the foreign artists who visited the socialist North and sang the song "Liberate the North" in Vietnamese or translated into their language... Someone had said to the Vietnamese delegate that the song had become a "second Internationale", a song against the American aggresion by the people around the world.

== Lyrics ==
=== Vietnamese lyrics ===
Giải phóng miền Nam, chúng ta cùng quyết tiến bước.
Diệt Đế quốc Mỹ, phá tan bè lũ bán nước.
Ôi xương tan máu rơi, lòng hận thù ngất trời.
Sông núi bao nhiêu năm cắt rời.
Đây Cửu Long hùng tráng. Đây Trường Sơn vinh quang.
Thúc giục đoàn ta xung phong đi giết quân thù.
Vai sát vai chung một bóng cờ.

Vùng lên! Nhân dân miền Nam anh hùng!
Vùng lên! Xông pha vượt qua bão bùng.
Thề cứu lấy nước nhà! Thề hy sinh đến cùng!
Cầm gươm, ôm súng, xông tới!
Vận nước đã đến rồi. Bình minh chiếu khắp nơi.
Nguyện xây non nước sáng tươi muôn đời.

=== English translation ===
To liberate the South, we determined to advance,
To exterminate the American imperialists, and destroy the country sellers.
Oh bones have broken, blood has fallen, the hatred is rising high.
Our river and mountain has been separated for so long.
Here, the sacred Mekong. Here, the glorious Truong Son
Are urging us to advance to kill the enemy,
Shoulder to shoulder, under a common flag!

Arise! Oh you brave people of the South!
Arise! Together through the storm!
Swear to save the homeland! Swear to sacrifice to the end!
Carrying the sword, holding the gun, go forward!
The country's fate has come. Dawn shines everywhere.
Wish to build our country forever shining.

== See also ==
- National anthem of South Vietnam
- Vietnam
- Vietnam War
- South Vietnam
- North Vietnam
- National anthem of Vietnam
