= Central Office for South Vietnam =

Political and military HQ (1962–1976)

According to Trương Như Tảng the Minister of Justice in the Provisional Revolutionary Government of the Republic of South Vietnam (PRG), COSVN existed in the giant Mimot Plantation. The headquarters of the three establishments (COSVN, NLF and PRG) are also confirmed and preserved by modern Vietnamese government.

Central Office for South Vietnam (abbreviated COSVN /ˈkɑːzvɪn/; Vietnamese: Trung ương Cục miền Nam, lit. 'Central Department of the South'), officially known as the Central Executive Committee of the People's Revolutionary Party from 1962 until its dissolution in 1976, was the American definition for the North Vietnamese political and military headquarters inside South Vietnam during the Vietnam War. It was envisaged as being in overall command of the communist effort in Republic of Vietnam (South Vietnam), encompassing the efforts of both People's Army of Vietnam (PAVN, or NVA to the Americans), and the National Liberation Front of South Vietnam or Viet Cong (VC), as well as the People's Revolutionary Party as the party's nominal organization. Some questioned its existence, but in his memoirs, General William Westmoreland, commander of Military Assistance Command, Vietnam (MACV), insisted its existence and importance were not in doubt.

According to PAVN Major General and later dissident Trần Độ, COSVN did exist and was responsible for organising and directing VC operations. It was however hierarchically overseen by the Central Office (Trung ương Cục) which directed overall strategy from Hanoi. COSVN existed to coordinate VC military and political efforts, as part of the wider Communist bid to reunify the country under their rule.

MACV had imagined COSVN as a physically large, permanent structure due to the carefully coordinated and planned nature of VC activity. It became a near obsessive fixture for US military and political leadership, referred to by some as the "Bamboo Pentagon." In fact, what the Americans called COSVN was a dispersed, highly-mobile headquarters network, often working out of thatched huts in the jungle. There was no centralized, static physical structure overseeing VC operations, as US and ARVN bombing and search and destroy missions forced VC leadership to remain mobile and well camouflaged.

MACV and the Joint Chiefs of Staff had sought to locate and target COSVN for nearly a decade, given its perceived importance in controlling the war effort. It became an obsession of Richard Nixon, who was advised by Admiral John McCain that its destruction could prove decisive:

The Joint Chiefs of Staff claimed to have located the enemy's headquarters inside Cambodia — what the United States called the Central Office for South Vietnam, or COSVN. The chiefs envisioned it as a "Bamboo Pentagon," concealed beneath the jungle's canopy. They thought that if you could blow up this central headquarters, you could cripple the enemy's capacity to command and control attacks on US forces in South Vietnam. McCain said the United States should destroy it and win the damn war.

In 1965, nearly 400 US warplanes attempted to wipe out COSVN in an aerial attack, but had no effect on the elusive shadow command. Frequent B-52 raids against its headquarters in Memot, Cambodia failed to kill any of its leadership, while insertion of US/ARVN Special Forces teams often resulted in heavy casualties, described as "poking a beehive the size of a basketball". COSVN narrowly avoided capture of its entire headquarters by ARVN and Cambodian forces in late March 1970, but after an evacuation to new bases further north in Kratie Province, regular VC operations in South Vietnam were resumed.

== History ==
The headquarters was reportedly created in 1961 when the southern and central branches of the Lao Dong Party (the Vietnamese Communist Party) merged into the Central Directorate for the South. An advance element of the Party's Central Committee, the headquarters was chartered to direct VC guerrilla operations in South Vietnam. Major General Tran Luong came south in May 1961 to reorganize the structure of the Directorate and its subordinate regions, Military Regions 1, 2, 3, 4, 6 and 10, known collectively as the B-2 Front. In the process, he created COSVN.

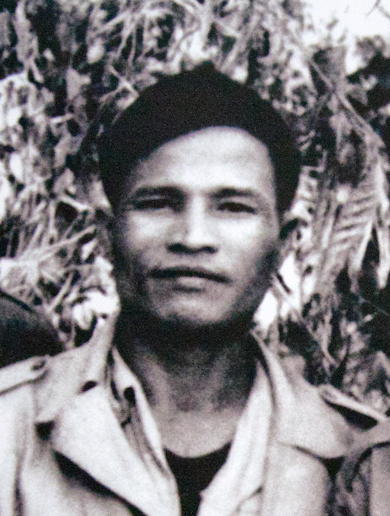
Nguyễn Chí Thanh, the leading strategist and military commander of the Viet Cong. He would die of a heart-attack in 1967 while reporting on the war situation to Hanoi.

In October 1963, COSVN organized the Military Affairs Party Committee (MAPC) and the Regional Military Headquarters. COSVN's first secretary, Nguyễn Văn Linh, served concurrently as the secretary of the MAPC, while General Trần Văn Trà became commander of the Regional Military Headquarters. Senior General Nguyễn Chí Thanh, a member of the northern politburo, arrived at COSVN in late 1963 or early 1964 to serve as southern regional political officer and became the dominant figure at the headquarters until his death during a visit to Hanoi in July 1967. This regional command structure reported through Thanh to the PAVN general staff in Hanoi. When Phạm Hùng replaced Thanh as the politburo's representative, he also became the first secretary of both COSVN and the MAPC.

== Reputed locations ==
During the early 1960s, COSVN was located in South Vietnam's Tây Ninh Province, northwest of Saigon near the Cambodian border. During the period of 1965–1970, the headquarters was located in and around the Cambodian Mimot plantation, in what was called the "Fishhook" area on the Vietnamese/Cambodian border north of Tây Ninh and west of Lộc Ninh. During the Cambodian Campaign of 1970, COSVN moved north-westward to the area around Kratié.

This was confirmed by first-person testimony provided to staff from the Cambodia-based media production group Camerado in 2008, during research for the motion picture Freedom Deal, which dramatizes the 1970 Cambodian Incursion from the point of view of the Cambodian people. A Cambodian community in the vicinity of Phnom Sambok, North of Kratié town, confirmed the location of staging areas for "large numbers of North Vietnamese vehicles and numerous structures" in the nearby forest.

A Time magazine article in 1970 reported that rather than being a jungle Pentagon as often conceived, "COSVN is actually a staff of some 2,400 people who are widely dispersed and highly mobile", traveling between various bunkers and meeting places by bicycle and motorbike.

== Subdivisions ==
It was believed by US intelligence that COSVN had several subdivisions, each of which dealt with the political, logistical, and military aspects of the struggle in South Vietnam. For tactical reasons US Radio Research units were primarily concerned with the military divisions, which were known as "MAS-COSVN" (Military Affairs Section) and "MIS-COSVN" (Military Intelligence Section). The political and logistical sub-divisions were left to the 175th Radio Research Field Station at Bien Hoa. These two sub-divisions usually occupied a location removed from, but generally near, the headquarters itself, as determined by ARDF or airborne radio direction finding.

Organisation chart of the Viet Cong, created from US Department of Engineers records.

== Operations to destroy COSVN ==
One of the central frustrations of the US military during the conflict was North Vietnam's use of Laos and Cambodia as logistical conduits and base areas. During the administration of President Lyndon B. Johnson, the US military was generally not allowed by its civilian commanders to widen the war by attacking the supply routes and sanctuaries in both countries due to their ostensible neutrality. An attempt was made to capture or destroy the headquarters during Operation Junction City, a massive search and destroy operation launched in the border region in February and March 1967.

Hampering bombing runs against rebel bases like COSVN was the assistance provided by Soviet ships in the Pacific. Soviet ships in the South China Sea gave vital early warnings to VC forces in South Vietnam. The Soviet intelligence ships detected American B-52 bombers flying from Okinawa and Guam, and relayed their airspeed and direction to COSVN headquarters. COSVN used this data to determine probable targets, and directed assets along the flight path to move "perpendicularly to the attack trajectory". While the bombing runs still caused extensive damage, the early warnings from 1968 to 1970 prevented them from killing a single military or civilian leader in the headquarters complexes.

On January 4, 1968, some of COSVN officials from Tây Ninh province encountered American soldiers when they were attempting to transfer food in the jungle, Huỳnh Tấn Phát's daughter Huỳnh Lan Khanh was captured and started to be escorted to Saigon. During the conflict several American military aircraft were shot down. Later Khanh's body was found by VC soldiers. She was buried with two other VC soldiers who died in this conflict.

Later, President Richard Nixon authorized border reconnaissance attacks, first in 1969 in the form of the covert bombing campaign known as Operation Menu, wherein the suspected site of COSVN in Cambodia was repeatedly and heavily bombed. In the spring of 1970, an overt ground incursion took place—-first an ARVN attack and then a joint ARVN–American attack that would later be called the Cambodian Campaign.

On March 18, the Cambodian National Assembly officially deposed the Cambodian leader Norodom Sihanouk and named Lon Nol as provisional head of state. The North Vietnamese response to the coup was swift. Even before Lon Nol's March 12 ultimatum for PAVN and VC forces to leave Cambodia, they had begun expanding their logistical system (the Ho Chi Minh trail) from southeastern Laos into northeastern Cambodia. After Sihanouk's overthrow and Lon Nol's anti-Vietnamese movements, PAVN launched an offensive (Campaign X) against the Cambodian army. They quickly seized large portions of the eastern and northeastern parts of the country, isolating and besieging or overrunning a number of Cambodian cities, including Kampong Cham. Fearing a joint ARVN–Cambodian attack after the coup, COSVN was evacuated to the newly Vietnamese-controlled Kratié Province of Cambodia on March 19, 1970.

As the PRG and VC headquarters prepared to follow the COSVN into Cambodia on March 30, they were surrounded in their bunkers by South Vietnamese forces flown in by helicopter. Surrounded, they awaited till nightfall and then with security provided by the 7th they broke out of the encirclement and fled north to unite with the COSVN in the Cambodian Kratié province. Trương Như Tảng, then Minister of Justice in the PRG, recounts the march to the northern bases as day after day of forced marches in the rain. Just before the column crossed route 7 heading north, they received word that on April 3 the 9th Division had fought and won in a battle near the city of Krek, Cambodia against ARVN forces. Years later, Trương would recall that during the escape of the Provisional Revolutionary Government just how "close [South Vietnamese] were to annihilating or capturing the core of the Southern resistance - elite units of our frontline fighters along with the civilian and much of the military leadership.

A month later, at the end of April, the US and ARVN tried again. The initial ARVN attack of the Cambodian Campaign was launched by ARVN and US ground forces, which attempted to "clean out the sanctuaries". PAVN/VC forces, however, had already been evacuated on March 19. COSVN and its sub-divisions had already withdrawn to the Kratié area and successfully avoided destruction. A marked reduction in radio traffic and transmitter power also made them difficult to place accurately at their new location, despite close 24-hour monitoring.

The military benefits and tragic repercussions of the bombing and invasion have been contentious subjects. Westmoreland thought that it was "unfortunate" that Nixon had announced the capture of COSVN as one of the primary objectives of the Cambodian operations. This left Nixon open to critics, who were already scornful of Nixon, to mock the notion of the president obsessing over COSVN as if it were a "holy grail". US Secretary of State Henry Kissinger was quoted as saying that the Cambodian invasion to destroy COSVN and other headquarters complexes bought the Americans and South Vietnamese a year. Members of the COSVN generally agree, but view the long-term political advantage gained as being worth the cost of the evacuation.

== "Bamboo Pentagon" ==
The "Bamboo Pentagon" was a mythical military headquarters of the VC, believed by US President Richard Nixon and the Joint Chiefs of Staff to exist deep inside the jungles of Cambodia. A further belief that destroying it would bring about an end to the Vietnam War helped lead to the American invasion of Cambodia on April 29, 1970.
