= Vanguard Youth (Vietnam) =

Vanguard Youth Thanh niên Tiền phong
- Leader: List: Huỳnh Tấn Phát; Thái Văn Lung; Hồ Văn Nhựt; Huỳnh Văn Tiểng; Mai Văn Bộ
- Chairperson: Phạm Ngọc Thạch
- Spokesperson: Lưu Hữu Phước
- Founded: 21 April 1945
- Dissolved: September 1945 (joined the Viet Minh in 22 August 1945)
- Headquarters: 14 Charner street, Saigon
- Newspaper: Tiến (Onwards)
- Membership (1945): ~ 1.2 million
- National affiliation: Empire of Vietnam; League for Independence of Vietnam (after August 22)
- Colors
- Slogan: "Thanh niên, tiến!" (Onwards, youth!)
- Anthem: Tiếng gọi thanh niên

Party flag

The Vanguard Youth (Vietnamese: Thanh Niên Tiền Phong, chữ Hán: 靑年前鋒) was a mass youth organization established in Cochinchina on 21 April 1945.

This organization was led by Dr. Pham Ngoc Thach of the Indochinese Communist Party, and initially cooperated with the Japanese colonial rulers in hope of securing an independent state. During the summer of 1945, it recruited 200,000 members. Soon, it had over a million members in Cochinchina. Vanguard Youth eventually joined the Viet Minh in late August 1945 during the August Revolution.

After the August Revolution, the organization was divided. The maiority joined National Salvation Youth (later become the Ho Chi Minh Communist Youth Union). A small number of organization's leaders joined other political organizations.

== The summons of the Vanguard Youth ==
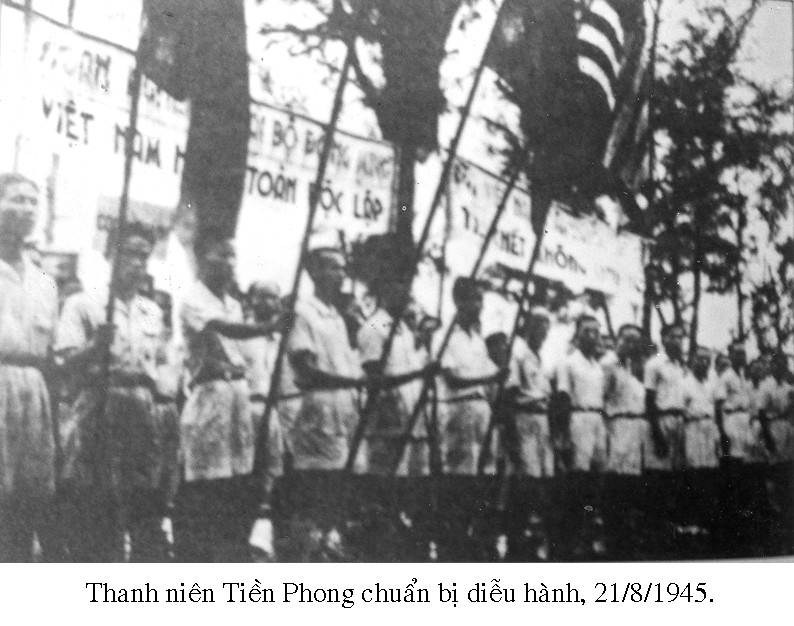
Members of the Vanguard Youth in Vietnam (1945)

''You are striving separately, carrying the same worry, waiting for an organization. Then, "Vanguard Youth" was established. What you are doing now, operate in any certain range, pursue a certain direction, the Vanguard Youth does not need to know. The Vanguard Youth do not need to know what class or religion you belong to. The Vanguard Youth only knows that you are a Vietnamese youth and only expects from you:

- A youth with determination.
- A youth dares to look at the reality of society.
- A youth who is not afraid to see, not afraid to understand and not afraid to sacrifice.

Because only then, can you be a wise youth of this era.

Hey all young people out there!

You must go beyond class boundaries, join a large, open organization...

Why are you still mourning the harmful frameworks that block the connection between the youth. The boundaries that have been protected and covered for decades, that have only one purpose: to divide young people into many groups and factions... to destroy the spirit of solidarity.

You only have one class: CLASS OF THE YOUTH.

You only have one duty: DUTY OF THE YOUTH.

You only have one purpose: NATIONAL LIBERATION.

The most important thing is that you should not be pessimistic. When the blood is flowing in the veins, when the life force is rushing, we must be confident. Indifference is against nature. Why do we still aimlessly rely on the bourgeoisie?

Let go of the old thinking, a false thinking. Forge a new, completely new thinking. Never succumb to a traditional thought, always seeking to rise above. Trust in scientific methods, based on certain circumstances. Break your passivity. In short, we must cultivate a strong thinking of reform. The Vanguard Youth will help you achieve that first goal. And after a period of rigorous training, you will be able to practice the task. The Vanguard Youth will bring you into contact with society. Society is waiting for us with so many earnest needs, not yet brought to light, rights, status, justice. Think of the immense people waiting for you. And they are ready to support you, they are an endless fighting force. In short, you will have all the conditions to succeed.

Hey all young people!

The Vanguard Youth is waiting for you: Be strong, you must get stronger, believe, you must have more faith. Active, you must be more active. Then you have secured the future of the Fatherland."

According to the memoirs of Nguyễn Kỳ Nam, this summons was widely spread, and the people were very excited. Walking on the street, sitting in a restaurant, whenever they meet, they talk about joining the Vanguard Youth. After this summons is released for 24 hours, young people from all over the place would go to the head office to register.
