= Dương Quỳnh Hoa =

Vietnamese politician

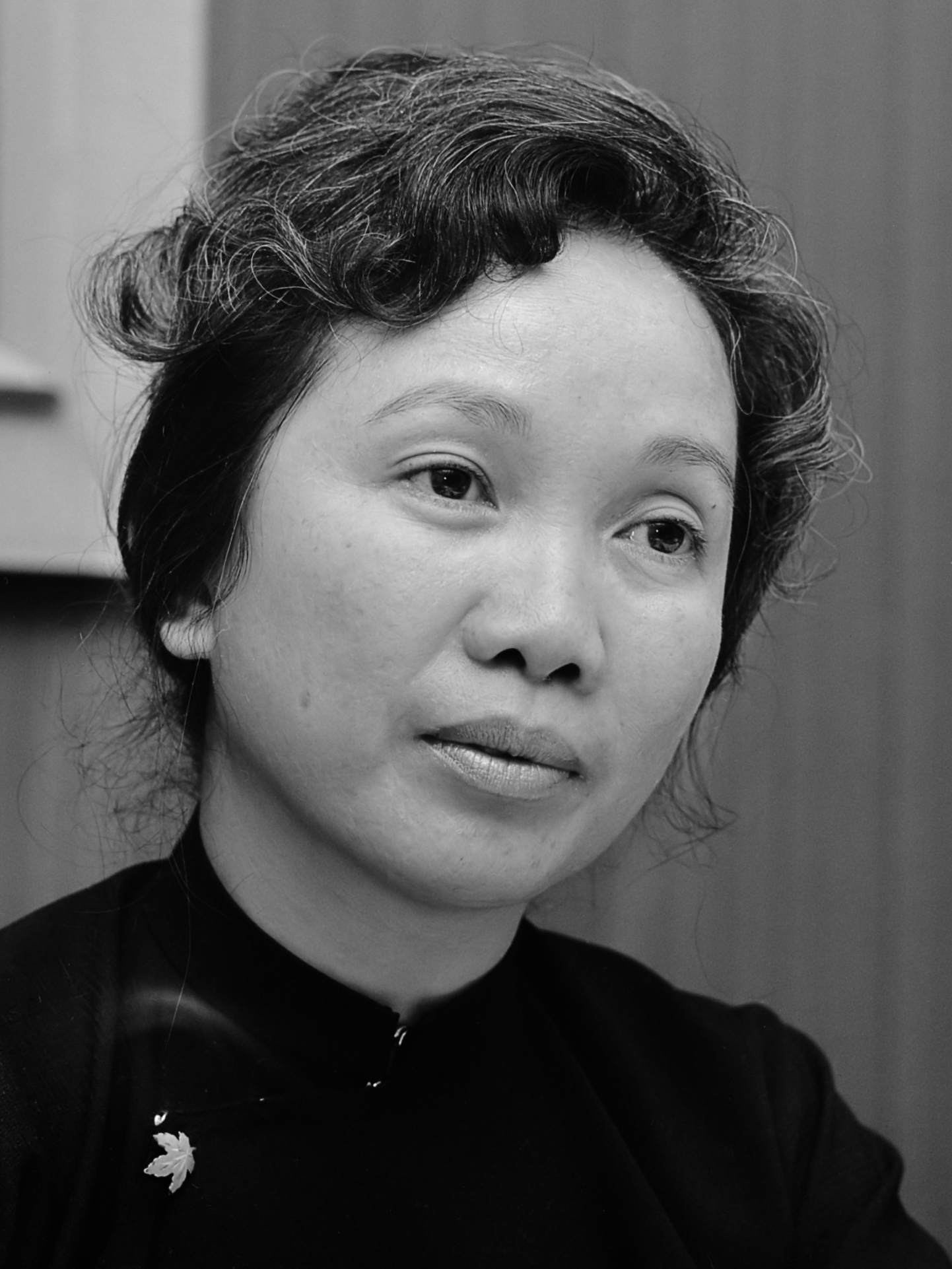
- Dương Quỳnh Hoa in 1974
- Born: 6 March 1930; Saigon, French Cochinchina
- Died: 25 February 2006 (aged 75); Ho Chi Minh City, Vietnam
- Occupations: Paediatrician, politician, public health campaigner
- Organisation: National Front for the Liberation of South Vietnam (founding member)
- Known for: Health and Social Affair Minister in South Vietnam's provisional revolutionary government; Vietnamese Victims of Agent Orange class action lawsuit (2004)
- Political party: French Communist Party; Communist Party of Vietnam (1959-1979)
- Spouse: Huỳnh Văn Nghị (1928-2015)
- Children: 1

Dương Quỳnh Hoa (1930–2006) was a notable member of the National Liberation Front (Việt Cộng) in South Vietnam during the Vietnam War and a member of its provisionary government, serving as a cabinet member.

== Early years ==
Born in 1930, Hoa was from a southern upper-class family, which had been Frenchified during the colonial era. After completing her secondary schooling in Vietnam, she moved to Paris in the 1950s to study Medicine. It was in Paris that she became a communist. Upon finishing her degree, she returned to southern Vietnam, which following the partition of Vietnam following the Battle of Dien Bien Phu and the Geneva Conference had become part of the anti-communist Republic of Vietnam. During this period of the late 1950s and early 1960s, Hoa spied for the communists, as she socialised with the Saigon elite at cocktail parties with the inner circle of President Ngo Dinh Diem and the American advisors in Vietnam, who were oblivious to the fact that the upper-class southerner was a communist.

During this time, she was a founding member of the National Front for the Liberation of South Vietnam, which was formed in 1960.

== War time activities ==
Early in 1968 when the Tet Offensive broke out, Hoa and her husband, Huỳnh Văn Nghị, a mathematician, fled Saigon to a NLF hideout in the jungle. There, the couple's son died of encephalitis. Although she never recovered from the personal loss, she put on a brave face in an interview with American journalist Stanley Karnow, quipping that her son was "only one among millions".

She was appointed as the NLF's deputy minister of health in its Provisional Revolutionary Government. She was named as a "heroine of the revolution. Of her involvement with the NLF, she said in 1981, "We had no choice. We had to get rid of the foreigners."

== Critic of the status-quo ==
Following the war Hoa founded and became the director of the Centre of Pediatrics, Development and Health in the now renamed Ho Chi Minh City.

After the reunification of the country, Hoa eventually became a vocal critic of the new government. She stated "I have been a communist all my life, but now I've seen the realities of Communism, and it is a failure — mismanagement, corruption, privilege, repression. My ideals are gone."

Hoa also attacked the cadres who later moved into the south after the reunification, who she felt were inattentive to southern regional characteristics and sensitivities. She was particularly critical of the forced land collectivisation programs, noting that some southern peasants went to the NLF due to their policy of land reform, whereas South Vietnam had been proponents of land policies that were favourable to the landed gentry. Of the northerners who came to the south, she expressed her contempt, saying that "They behave as though they conquered us." At the time, the failure of the rice harvest and declining food rations had seen record levels of malnutrition at the hospital that she ran.

In 1990, she declared to Karnow that "Communism has been catastrophic. Party officials have never understood the need for rational development. They've been hypnotized by Marxist slogans that have lost validity — if they were ever valid. They are outrageous." Talking of the corruption practiced by the officials and their wives, she said that it was equivalent to what occurred in South Vietnam: "This is very much a feudal society, whatever its ideological veneer."

== Agent Orange class action lawsuit ==
During the Vietnam War, Hoa was working Biên Hòa, Sông Bé, and Tây Ninh, which were heavily sprayed with Agent Orange, a toxic herbicide used by the U.S. Military, which has since been shown to be carcinogenic. Long after the end of the war, in 1998, Hoa was diagnosed with breast cancer; her blood test in 1999 also showed high levels of dioxin, a carcinogenic compound present in agent orange.

In 2004, as part of Vietnam Association for Victims of Agent Orange/Dioxin (VAVA), Hoa was one of the first three Vietnamese victims of Agent Orange to take part in a class action lawsuit. The case was filed in the Eastern New York District Court, against several US companies involved in manufacturing the toxic herbicide. In the lawsuit, Hoa also sought compensation for her deceased child, Huynh Trung Son, born in 1970 with multiple disabilities and died at 8 months old from encephalitis. Following her son's death, Hoa also experienced two miscarriages, after which she decided to not become pregnant again. It was alleged in the lawsuit that Hoa's cancer and miscarriages, as well as her son's disabilities and premature death, were caused by her exposure to Agent Orange. The case was later dismissed in 2005 by Judge Jack B. Weinstein.

Prior to the legal action, Hoa had long been outspoken about the impact of Agent Orange, especially in her capacity as director of Ho Chi Minh city's Centre of Pediatrics, Development and Health. Speaking to The Washington Post in 1990, Hoa said that "cancer and other diseases attributed to Agent Orange [were] beyond the capabilities of Vietnam's strained medical structure" as the country rebuilt itself after the war. Hoa had also been critical of the Vietnamese government's reluctance to seek accountability from the US government. She said in an interview in 1996:

The government is afraid. They refuse to talk about war crimes and dioxin because it might damage relations with the United States. It's a time of peace, a time of normalization... I think the government is more concerned with money now than (with) Agent Orange.

== Cited works ==
- Karnow, Stanley (1997). Vietnam: A history. Penguin Books. ISBN 0-670-84218-4.
- Tucker, Spencer C. (2000). Encyclopedia of the Vietnam War. ABC-CLIO. ISBN 1-57607-040-9.
