= Lưu Hữu Phước =

Vietnamese composer (1921–1989)

Background information
- Also known as: Huỳnh Minh Siêng, Long Hưng, Anh Lưu, Hồng Chí
- Born: 12 September 1921; Ô Môn, Cần Thơ, Cochinchina, French Indochina
- Died: June 8, 1989 (aged 67) Ho Chi Minh City, Vietnam
- Genres: Pre-1945 new Vietnamese music, Vietnamese Red music, Children music, Musical theatrical plays
- Years active: 1939–1989

Lưu Hữu Phước (Note: In this Vietnamese name, the surname is Lưu, but is often simplified to Luu in English-language text. In accordance with Vietnamese custom, this person should be referred to by the given name, Phước.) (12 September 1921 – 8 June 1989) was a Vietnamese composer, a member of the National Assembly, and Chairman of the Committee of Culture and Education of the National Assembly of the Socialist Republic of Vietnam.

Phước, together with Mai Văn Bộ and Huỳnh Văn Tiểng, were the members of the famous composer trio Hoàng–Mai–Lưu, known with the common pseudonym Huỳnh Minh Siêng.

He was most notably the author of two South Vietnamese national anthems: Giải phóng miền Nam (Liberate the South) of the Việt Cộng-led Provisional Revolutionary Government and Tiếng gọi thanh niên (March of the Youths), whose lyrics was later changed to become Tiếng gọi công dân (March of the Citizens) and used as anthem by the State of Vietnam and the Republic of Vietnam despite his protest.

== Youth and pre-1945 activities ==
Phước was born on 12 September 1921 in district Ô Môn, province Cần Thơ (now belongs to Cần Thơ city). He accessed music literature during his childhood and managed to practice several instruments including đàn nguyệt, mandolin, and guitar.

Phước attended the Petrus Ký highschool in Saigon (now the Lê Hồng Phong High School for the Gifted) in about 1935. He met Mai Văn Bộ and Huỳnh Văn Tiểng and they quickly became close friends. They were later known as "the trio of Hoàng–Mai–Lưu" and collaborated in many music projects. Together, they created a "Scholar Club" consisting of Vietnamese patriotic students. In 1939, Phước composed the music of La Marche des Étudiants with the French lyrics by Mai Văn Bộ. The song was quickly approved as the anthem of the Scholar Club. The song was later known as Tiếng gọi thanh niên (Call of the Youths).

After finishing high school, Phước moved to Hanoi to attend the Medicine School of Indochina University from 1940 to 1944. He actively participated in the patriotic student movement and made contacts with the Viet Minh. During this time he composed many famous patriotic songs including Bạch Đằng Giang (Bạch Đằng River), Ải Chi Lăng (Gate of Chi Lăng), Hát Giang trường hận ("Long hatred on Hát River", later revised as Hồn tử sĩ, "Soul of the Martyred Soldier"), and Hội nghị Diên Hồng (Diên Hồng assembly). His song La Marche des Étudiants was performed in 1943 Hùng Kings' Festival and quickly became famous.

Phước also wrote a play named Tục luỵ (Suffering) performed on 21 March 1943 at the Hanoi Grand Theatre.

In 1944, under the instruction of the Viet Minh, Phước took part in a campaign calling Vietnamese students to leave the academic life for the patriotic movement. He collaborated with his close friend Huỳnh Văn Tiểng, Mai Văn Bộ and Đặng Ngọc Tốt to compose the songs Xếp bút nghiên (Put away the penmanship), Mau về Nam (Quickly go to the South), and Gieo ánh sáng (Sowing the Light).

== After 1945 ==
After the 1945 August Revolution, Phước continued to work for revolutionary government. He met president Ho Chi Minh at the 1st National Assembly in 1946.

The French invaded the southern part of Vietnam not long after the Revolution. Lưu Hữu Phước then took part in propaganda works as Director of Publishing House of the South. In May 1946, Lưu Hữu Phước traveled back to Hanoi and participate in the establishment of Central Music Academy in September. The First Indochina War began in December 1946, Lưu Hữu Phước and other patriotic artists evacuated to Việt Bắc together with Vietnamese government. Then he was tasked with the establishment of "Vanguard Propaganda Young Pioneer" (later known as Resistant Young Pioneer's Musical Theatre of the Central Music Academy) who performed several of his notable plays. Lưu Hữu Phước was also tasked with the establishment became the Director of Art School for Children in 1950.

During this time, Phước composed some famous music including Ca ngợi Hồ Chủ tịch (Song for Praising President Ho Chi Minh), Khúc khải hoàn (Triumph Song), Thiếu nhi thế giới liên hoan (International Children Festival), Nông dân vươn mình (The age of twenty), Henri Martin, Em yêu chị Rây-mông (I love elder sister Raymond), Cả cuộc đời về ta (All the life belong to us), etc.

The Vietnam War (1955–1975) happened soon after the French defeat in Indochina War. From 1954 to 1964, Phước was recalled to North Vietnam and was appointed as the Director of the Music and Dancing Research Group (belong to Department of Arts), then the Director of the Department of Music and Dancing, and member of the Standing Committee of Vietnam Union of Literature and Arts Associations and the Secretariat of Vietnam Union of Musician. He made significant contribution in Vietnamese folk song researches, especially about quan họ. He participate in the establishment of Vietnam Music School (now the Vietnam National Academy of Music), Dancing School, Movie and Stage School, and Vietnam Symphony Theatre of Opera and Ballet.

Phước traveled to South Vietnam on Feb 1965 and was appointed as the Chairman of Arts and Literature Association of the National Liberation Front. When the Provisional Revolutionary Government of the Republic of South Vietnam was established in 1969, he was appointed as the Minister of Culture and Information. He composed several songs during this time, including Dưới cờ Đảng vẻ vang (Under the Party Flag), Bài hát Giải phóng quân (Song of the Liberation Army), Tình Bác sáng đời ta (Uncle Ho's love enlightens our life), Hành khúc giải phóng (Liberation march), Xuống đường (To the street). Especially, Lưu Hữu Phước together with his famous collaborators Mai Văn Bộ and Huỳnh Văn Tiểng composed the song Giải phóng miền Nam (Liberate the South), the national anthem of the communist-led Republic of South Vietnam. And his song Tiến về Sài Gòn (March on Saigon) was later adopted by Vietnamese film Giải phóng Sài Gòn (Liberate Saigon) from 2005.

The war ended in 1975. Phước was then appointed as the Director of Music Research Institute in 1978. He became a Professor and Corresponding Member of East Germany's Academy of Arts. He was appointed as the Chairman of National Music Council, Member of the International Music Council, and Director of National Assembly Committee of Culture and Education, Member of Central Committee of National Front of Vietnam, Vice-chairman of the Presidency of the Central Committee of the Vietnam Union of Literature and Arts Associations.

Phước died on 8 June 1989 at Ho Chi Minh City.

== Works ==
- Tiếng Gọi Thanh Niên (A Call to Youth), 1939
- Bạch Đằng Giang (Bạch Đằng River)
- Ải Chi Lăng (Gate of Chi Lăng)
- Tục luỵ (Suffering)
- Hát Giang trường hận (Long Hatred on River Hát), 1942–1943
- Xếp bút nghiên (Put away the penmanship), 1944
- Mau về Nam (Quickly go to the South), 1944
- Gieo ánh sáng (Sowing the Light), 1944
- Hội nghị Diên Hồng (Diên Hồng assembly)
- Khúc khải hoàn (Triumph Song), 1945
- Hồn tử sĩ (Soul of the Matyred Soldier), 1946
- Ca ngợi Hồ chủ tịch (Song for Praising President Ho Chi Minh), 1947
- Dưới cờ Đảng vẻ vang (Under the Party Flag)
- Bài hát Giải phóng quân (Song of the Liberation Army)
- Tình Bác sáng đời ta (Uncle Ho's love enlightens our life)
- Hành khúc giải phóng (Liberation march)
- Xuống đường (To the street)
- Giải phóng miền Nam (Liberate the South), 1961
- Tiến về Sài Gòn (March on Saigon), 1966
- Opera – Bông Sen (Lotus), 1968

== Honor ==
The Lưu Hữu Phước Park (Công viên Lưu Hữu Phước) in Cần Thơ is built in honor of him.
