= People's Revolutionary Party (Vietnam) =

People's Revolutionary Party Đảng Nhân dân Cách mạng Việt Nam
- Governing body: Central Office for South Vietnam
- Chairman: Võ Chí Công
- General Secretary: Nguyễn Văn Linh
- Founded: 1 January 1962 (64 years, 152 days)
- Dissolved: 1976; 50 years ago
- Merged into: Communist Party of Vietnam
- Headquarters: Tây Ninh
- Ideology: Revolutionary socialism Marxism-Leninism; National communism Vietnamese nationalism Anti-imperialism
- National affiliation: (Provisional Revolutionary Government of the Republic of South Vietnam) National Liberation Front

Party flag

The People's Revolutionary Party of Vietnam (PRP; Vietnamese: Đảng Nhân dân Cách mạng Việt Nam) was a political party in South Vietnam established in 1962, being the counter-part of the Workers' Party of Vietnam (based in North Vietnam) to provide formal political leadership for the National Liberation Front against the US-backed Republic of Vietnam. In 1976, following the communists' victory and the fall of Saigon, the party was formally merged with the Workers' Party of Vietnam in North Vietnam to form the modern Communist Party of Vietnam.

The PRP was founded on January 1, 1962. Its foundation was publicly announced by Radio Hanoi on January 18, 1962. The stated goals of the party was to combat imperialism, feudalism and colonialism. PRP was not an explicitly communist party, but according to the January 18 Radio Hanoi broadcast, it represented the Marxist–Leninists in South Vietnam. PRP was led by a Central Committee, often referred to as the Central Office for South Vietnam (COSVN). The smallest organizational unit of PRP was the cell. 1-7 cells constituted a chi bo, the street or hamlet level organization of the party. PRP was the leading force in the National Liberation Front (NLF). Both at national and local levels PRP committees led the NLF work. In the Central Committee there were three main responsibilities, Military Commissar (coordinating the relations with the People's Army of Vietnam), NLF control and general administration. Võ Chí Công was party chairman.
