= Trương Như Tảng =

Vietnamese lawyer and politician (1923–2005)

- Trương Như Tảng in 1976 as the Minister of Justice

Minister of Justice
- In office June 8, 1969 – 1978

Personal details
- Born: 14 November 1923 Cholon, Cochinchina, French Indochina
- Died: 8 November 2005 (aged 81) Paris, France
- Party: Provisional Revolutionary Government

Trương Như Tảng (14 November 1923 – 8 November 2005) was a South Vietnamese lawyer and politician. He was active in many organizations opposed to the South Vietnamese government before joining the newly created Provisional Revolutionary Government of the Republic of South Vietnam as the Minister of Justice. He spent many years in the jungles near and in Cambodia until the Fall of Saigon in 1975. He quickly became disillusioned with the new government and escaped the reunited Socialist Republic of Vietnam via a boat in August 1978. He was sent to a refugee camp in Indonesia before moving to Paris, France, to live out his life in exile.

== Early life ==
Tảng grew up in Saigon as one of six sons of a rich father who owned a rubber plantation and a printing house and taught ("for pleasure") at the Collège Chasseloup-Laubat; since his father intended him to be a pharmacist, after studying (exclusively in French) at the Collège Chasseloup-Laubat, Tảng was sent to Hanoi University for a year and then (after a delay caused by the violence attendant on the end of World War II in Vietnam) to France in 1946 to study pharmacy. While in Paris, however, Tảng was introduced to the movement for Vietnamese independence, met Hồ Chí Minh, and transferred to the École des Sciences Politiques, where he focused on military and diplomatic subjects and was especially drawn to Marxist writings on colonialism. When he refused to return to Saigon at his father's command, he was cut off and had to work as a dishwasher to earn his living. By 1951, he had completed his studies, having earned a master's degree in political science and having gone on to take a licentiate in law at the University of Paris. However, at the end of the year, he returned to Vietnam at his father's urgent request to help put his brothers through school. To avoid draft into the South Vietnamese army, he joined the newly created French School of Naval Supply in 1954. At the end of 1955, he took a job as Controller-General of the Viet-Nam Bank for Industry and Commerce, but he also became involved in opposition to the Ngô Đình Diệm government.

== Anti-government organizer ==
Through contacts that he had made during his studies in France, Tảng became involved in the anti-government activities in South Vietnam. His position as corporate executive gave him access to the ruling circle and he could easily recruit non-communist anti-government people. Through this time he became close friends with co-conspirator Albert Thảo until Thảo's death in 1965. In February 1965, he was arrested and held for six months by the National Police and held in jail under suspicion of being part of the Self-Determination Movement, an anti-government group opposed to the Diệm regime (the Diệm regime had already ceased in 1963, two years earlier). After his wife paid a US$5,000 (US$ 51,082 in 2025) bribe to the South Vietnamese military tribunal, Tảng was sentenced to just two years, which were then suspended. His arrest did not stop Tảng's activities and he continued his urban organizing of anti-government forces before being arrested a second time.

== Arrest and life in the jungle ==
On June 16, 1966, he was pulled over by agents working under General Nguyễn Ngọc Loan. He was held at a National Police secret prison where he was tortured and held without charge. An anti-government agent, Ba Tra, had been arrested and gave the South Vietnamese government extensive information on anti-government forces working in the city. Ba Tra was held and tortured for about two weeks before signing a confession that he was a communist. Another bribe by his wife of US$6000 (US$ 61,299 in 2025) got him transferred to National Police headquarters where, in a small cell, he spent the next six months.

In February 1967, he and two other women anti-government organizers, San No and Duy Lien, were part of a secret prisoner exchange for two American prisoners. The three were handed over to American forces and then flown out to the jungle where they were handed over to NLF operatives. During his stay in the jungles of South Vietnam, he was one of the founders of the National Liberation Front (The NLF had already been established in 1960, seven years earlier), and Minister of Justice for the Provisional Revolutionary Government of the Republic of South Vietnam (PRG) during the Vietnam War. In April 1970, he was part of the escape of the Provisional Revolutionary Government when the military and civilian leadership of PRG and NLF were almost wiped out by ARVN forces.

== Disillusionment ==
Tảng returned to Saigon from Hanoi after the Fall of Saigon in 1975. The nature of the collapse of the South Vietnamese regime and the total victory of the PAVN gave total control to the communist elements. He and his peers from the NLF and PRG became almost immediately aware of the ways in which officials from the Democratic Republic of Vietnam (DRV) disregarded their authority during the reintegration process.

In his memoir, Tảng recalls an emergence of doubts during Saigon's Victory Celebrations on May 15, two weeks after the city's capture. Tảng noticed the military cavalcade was composed solely of units from the DRV's military, the People's Army of Vietnam (PAVN). Tảng was standing next to PAVN general Văn Tiến Dũng and asked him where the PRG's military units were. Dũng responded that the army had "already been unified," and ignored Tảng's further questions. This angered Tảng as the PRG had, to his knowledge, not been consulted on the decision. In the following months, the PRG cabinet played what Tảng referred to as a "subordinate role" to the DRV. Much of the PRG's responsibilities in formulating a new Southern government were fulfilled by Northern cadres.

In 1978, only two years after the PAVN finally took Saigon and united Vietnam, Tảng became disillusioned with the government of the Socialist Republic of Vietnam, which he believed did not give equal standing to southern sympathizers. Not helping matters was the imprisonment of two of his brothers in the reeducation camps. While it was supposed to last only thirty days, the imprisonment of his younger brother, Bich, a director at the National Bank, was prolonged, and he was released only after many months of lobbying on the part of Tảng. The older brother, Quynh, a doctor who worked with the Health Ministry, was moved to a high security camp in the north where he was incarcerated at least until 1985.

After spending some time in exile in the Vietnamese countryside, Tảng decided to leave the country before things got worse. Through friends of his wife, he and others pooled their money to buy a boat, which they boarded in August 1978. While on the open ocean, they tried to flag down ships patrolling the busy shipping lanes. However, none of the freighters would stop to pick them up, and they drifted further and further south. They were attacked by Thai pirates, who stole money and valuables from the passengers but let the boat continue on. Their boat travelled almost to Indonesia before coming across an Indonesian oil platform. Stopping there, they were picked up by UN ships and taken to a refugee camp on Galang Island, Indonesia. From there, Tảng went into exile in Paris, and, in 1985, published a book about his life in the NLF and PRG. The book, A Vietcong Memoir, outlines not only his own experiences, but also the impact of the war among other revolutionaries.

== Published works ==
- Truong, Như Tảng; David Chanoff, Van Toai Doan (1985). A Vietcong memoir (1985 ed.). Harcourt Brace Jovanovich. ISBN 978-0-15-193636-6. - Total pages: 350

== Notes and references ==
Notes

References

- Europa (1999). International Who's Who 2000, Volume 63 (1999 ed.). Europa. ISBN 978-1-85743-050-9. - Total pages: 1743
- Kahin, George McT. (1979). "Political Polarization in South Vietnam: U.S. Policy in the Post-Diem Period". Pacific Affairs. 52 (4). Vancouver, British Columbia: 647–673. doi:10.2307/2757066. JSTOR 2757066.
- Thomas, Robert McG (July 16, 1998). "Nguyen Ngoc Loan, 67, Dies; Executed Viet Cong Prisoner". The New York Times.
- Truong, Như Tảng; David Chanoff, Van Toai Doan (1985). A Vietcong memoir (1985 ed.). Harcourt Brace Jovanovich. ISBN 978-0-15-193636-6.- Total pages: 350
- Tang, Truong Nhu (March 31, 1985). "A New Look at the Old Enemy". The New York Times.
- Manning, Robert (May 26, 1985). "Defeated by Victory". The New York Times.
