= Provisional Revolutionary Government of the Republic of South Vietnam =

1969–1976 opposition government and state in South Vietnam

Provisional Revolutionary Government of the Republic of South Vietnam (1969–1975) Chính phủ Cách mạng lâm thời Cộng hòa miền Nam Việt Nam Republic of South Vietnam (1975–1976) Cộng hòa miền Nam Việt Nam
- 1969–1976
- Flag
- Motto: Độc lập – Dân chủ – Hòa bình – Trung lập "Independence – Democracy – Peace – Neutrality"
- Anthem: Giải phóng miền Nam "Liberate the South"
- Military emblem of the Liberation Army of South Vietnam

- Republic of South Vietnam (dark green) after the Fall of Saigon.
- Status: Rival government in opposition to the Republic of Vietnam (1969–1975) puppet state of the Democratic Republic of Vietnam (1975–1976)
- Capital: Tây Ninh (1969–1972); Lộc Ninh (1972–1973); Cam Lộ (1973–1975); Saigon – Gia Dinh (1975–1976)
- Common languages: Vietnamese
- Government: Unitary communist state under a provisional government
- Chairman of the People's Revolutionary Party
  - 1962–1976: Võ Chí Công
- Chairman of government
  - 1969–1976: Huỳnh Tấn Phát
- Chairman of Consultative Council
  - 1969–1976: Nguyễn Hữu Thọ
- Legislature: People's Assembly
- Historical era: Vietnam War; Cold War
  - Government formed: 8 June 1969
  - Fall of Saigon: 30 April 1975
  - Vietnamese reunification: 2 July 1976

Area
- 1975: 173,809 km^{2} (67,108 sq mi)
- Currency: Liberation dong
Preceded by	Succeeded by
Republic of Vietnam	Socialist Republic of Vietnam
- Today part of: Vietnam

The Provisional Revolutionary Government of the Republic of South Vietnam (PRG, Vietnamese: Chính phủ Cách mạng Lâm thời Cộng hòa miền Nam Việt Nam, chữ Hán: 政府革命臨時共和面南越南), was formed on 8 June 1969, by the Democratic Republic of Vietnam (North Vietnam), as an armed rival government opposing the Republic of Vietnam (South Vietnam) under President Nguyễn Văn Thiệu. Delegates of the National Liberation Front of South Vietnam (Viet Cong), as well as several smaller groups, participated in its creation.

The PRG was recognized as the government of South Vietnam by most communist states and Malta. It signed the 1973 Paris Peace Treaty as an independent entity, separate from both South Vietnam and North Vietnam. After the Fall of Saigon on 30 April 1975, the PRG formally replaced the Republic of Vietnam to become the nominal and representative government of South Vietnam under the official name Republic of South Vietnam (Vietnamese: Cộng hòa miền Nam Việt Nam), assuming the properties, rights, and obligations of the former Republic of Vietnam. On 2 July 1976, the Republic of South Vietnam and the Democratic Republic of Vietnam constitutionally merged to form the current Socialist Republic of Vietnam.

== History ==
The Provisional Revolutionary Government was preceded by the Vietnam Alliance of National, Democratic, and Peaceful Forces (VANDPF) made up of anti-government forces and headed by Trinh Dinh Thao. The Alliance was a collection of individuals who wanted a new South Vietnamese government but disagreed with the ever-present Northern Communist presence.

Discussions about forming an alliance had begun as early as 1966, but plans were disrupted when South Vietnamese intelligence agents apprehended a prominent anti-government figure, Ba Tra. Ba Tra gave the South Vietnamese government extensive information on anti-government forces working in the city. This setback was compounded by his identification of one of the key cadre in the financial division.

Under torture, Ba Tra identified more figures in the underground, who were then arrested. By 1967, the entire Saigon organization had been sent further underground.

In early 1969, the then-new American president, Richard Nixon, started a process of Vietnamization to allow the United States Armed Forces to withdraw from South Vietnam.

=== 1969–1975 ===
On 8 June 1969 delegates from the Vietcong, the VANDPF, the People's Revolutionary Party (the South Vietnamese communist party) and "the usual assortment of mass organizations, ethnic groups, and geopolitical regions" met off Route 22 in Cambodia's Fishhook region and formed the Provisional Revolutionary Government (PRG). Banners displayed prominently at the convention proclaimed that "South Vietnam is independent, democratic, peaceful, and neutral".

Following the military and political results of the 1968 Tet Offensive and related military offensives in the South by Saigon and the United States, in which the Vietcong suffered serious military losses, the PRG was envisioned as a political counter-force that could influence international public opinion in support of reunification and in opposition to the United States and South Vietnam.

The declared purpose of the PRG was to provide a formal governmental structure to the NLF and enhance its claim of representing "the Southern people". Included in this strategy was the pursuit of a negotiated settlement to the war leading to reunification, organized during the initial phase of Vietnamization. According to Justice Minister Trương Như Tảng, the new group's main purpose was to help the NLF "acquire a new international stature."

During 1969–70, most of the PRG's cabinet ministries operated near the Cambodian border. Starting on 29 March to late April 1970, the US and South Vietnamese offensives forced the PRG to flee deeper into Cambodia. The stressful escape caused many of the PRG officials (such as Trương Như Tạng) to need extensive medical furloughs. After Trương Như Tạng returned, he noticed that new cadres from the north were causing problems for the non-communist members of the PRG. One member in particular, Ba Cap, harshly denounced most of the PRG as bourgeois. Tạng complained to the higher members of the DRV government, but was rebuffed. Tạng later saw this as the point when the PRG turned from being an independent South Vietnam-based alternative government to being a mouthpiece for the communist movement.

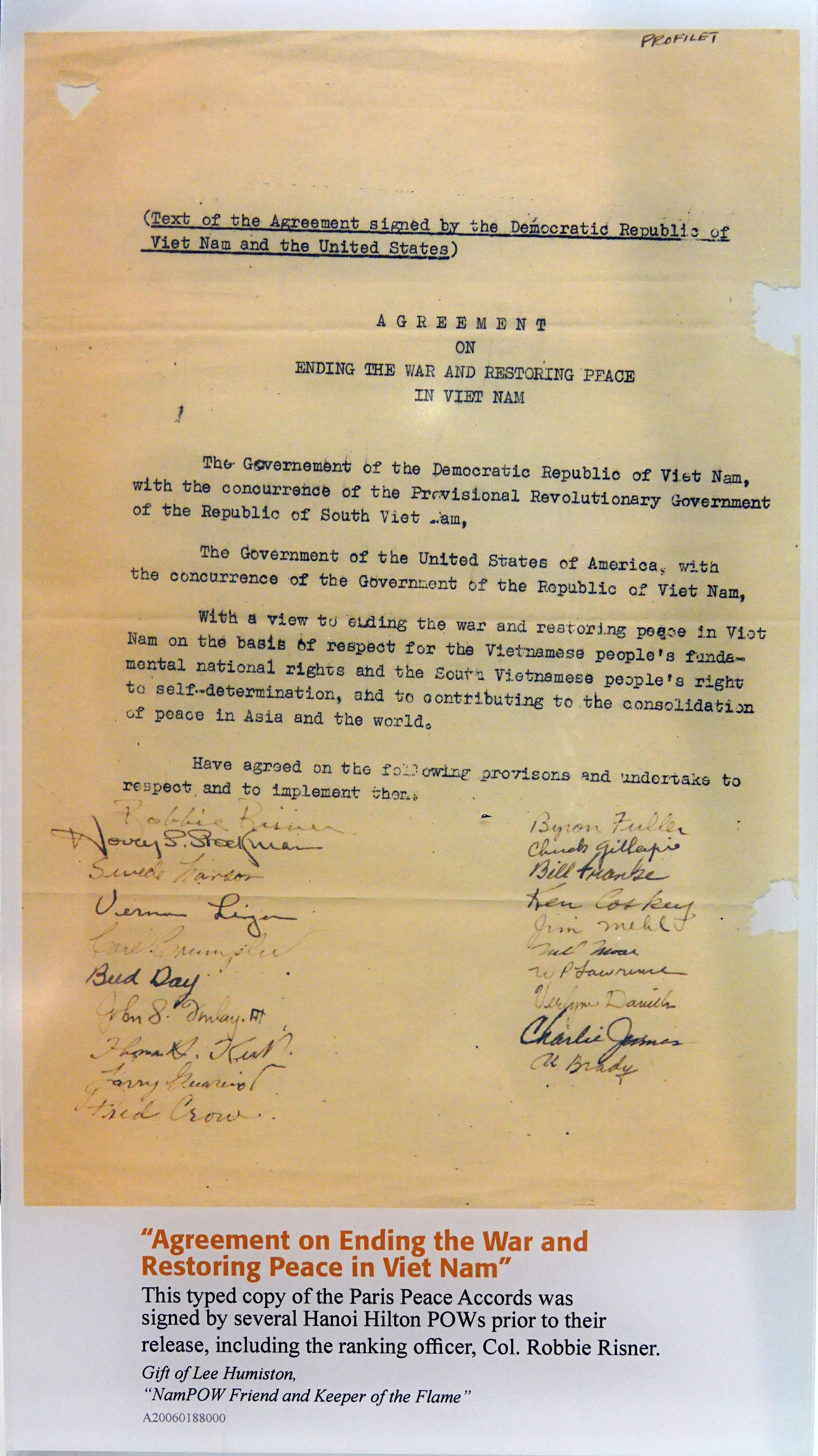
The PRG of the Republic of South Vietnam being named in the Paris Peace Accords as a DRV's concurrence.

The central bodies of the PRG functioned as a provisional government. The PRG maintained diplomatic relations with many countries of the Non-Aligned Movement, such as Algeria and SFR Yugoslavia as well as with the Soviet Union and the People's Republic of China.

=== 1975–1976 ===
After the Fall of Saigon on 30 April 1975, the PRG assumed power in South Vietnam and subsequently participated in the reunification of Vietnam.

According to professor Ngô Vĩnh Long (University of Maine), in mid-July 1975, the delegates of the Democratic Republic of Vietnam (Nguyễn Văn Lưu) and the Republic of South Vietnam (Đinh Bá Thi) applied to join the United Nations (UN) as two independent member states. However, both countries failed in joining the United Nations due to American vetoes on 11 August and 30 September 1975 as the USSR and China refused to allow South Korea to join the organization on 6 August. However, North Vietnam and North Vietnamese-occupied South Vietnam became two UN observers in 1975. Kuwait was the last country to recognize and establish diplomatic relations with the Republic of South Vietnam on 22 and 24 January 1976, before North and South Vietnam were eventually reunited on 2 July 1976.

== Government and politics ==
The Provisional Revolutionary Government of the Republic of South Vietnam was centralised as a part of the ideology of democratic centralism.

=== Cabinet ===
Post	Name	Took office	Left office	Party
Chairman of Consultative Council (Head of State)	Nguyễn Hữu Thọ	6 June 1969	2 July 1976	People's Revolutionary Party and Democratic Party of Vietnam
Chairman of Government (Prime Minister and de facto leader)	Huỳnh Tấn Phát	8 June 1969	2 July 1976	People's Revolutionary Party and Democratic Party of Vietnam
Vice-chairman	Phung Van Cung	8 June 1969	1976	Democratic Party of Vietnam
Vice-chairman	Nguyễn Văn Kiệt	8 June 1969	1976	
Vice-chairman	Nguyen Doa	8 June 1969	1976	
Minister of Presidential Palace of Government	Tran Buu Kiem	8 June 1969	1976	People's Revolutionary Party and Democratic Party of Vietnam
Minister of Defense	Trần Nam Trung	8 June 1969	1976	People's Revolutionary Party
Minister of Foreign Affairs	Nguyễn Thị Bình	8 June 1969	1976	People's Revolutionary Party
Minister of the Interior	Phung Van Cung	8 June 1969	1976	
Minister of Justice	Trương Như Tảng	8 June 1969	1976	
Minister of Economy and Finance	Cao Van Bon; Duong Ky Hiep (acting from 1975)	8 June 1969	died 1971	
Minister of Information and Culture	Lưu Hữu Phước	8 June 1969	1976	
Minister of Education and Youth	Nguyễn Văn Kiệt	8 June 1969	1976	
Minister of Health, Social Action and Disabled Soldiers	Dương Quỳnh Hoa	8 June 1969	1976	People's Revolutionary Party

== Foreign recognitions and relations ==
Within a year of its establishment in 1969, the Provisional Revolutionary Government of the Republic of South Vietnam was recognized by 25 countries and established diplomatic relations with them. By July 1976, before the formal reunification of North and South Vietnam, the Republic of South Vietnam had been formally recognized by 72 countries.

Countries (red) that recognized Provisional Revolutionary Government of Republic of South Vietnam (blue) as of 30/4/1975.

Countries (red) that recognized Provisional Revolutionary Government of Republic of South Vietnam (blue), and unconfirmed countries (yellow), as of 2/7/1976.

The countries which have officially recognized and established relations with the Provisional Revolutionary Government of the Republic of South Vietnam throughout its existence from 6/6/1969 to 2/7/1976 are as below. The list excludes North Vietnam even though both governments recognized each other. It also excludes the PRG relations with foreign political and military movements, organizations; as well as unrecognized states and governments-in-exile (such as Pathet Lao, Khmer Rouge, GRUNK...).

Period	Asia	Europe	Americas	Africa	Oceania	Total
Before the end of the Vietnam War (30/4/1975)	North Korea: 11/6/1969; Syria: 12/6/1969; Mongolia: 13/6/1969; China: 14/6/1969; Cambodia: 14/6/1969 (disrupted 25/3/1970-17/4/1975); Iraq: 7/7/1969; Bangladesh: 28/7/1973 (de factor) and 24/10/1973 (de jure); North Yemen (now Yemen): 14/6/1969 (de facto) and 13/11/1974 (de jure); India: 30/4/1975	East Germany (later reunified with West Germany): 12/6/1969; Poland: 12/6/1969; Romania: 12/6/1969; Soviet Union (now Russia): 13/6/1969; Hungary: 13/6/1969; Bulgaria: 13/6/1969; Czechoslovakia (now the Czech Republic and Slovakia): 13/6/1969; Albania: 16/6/1969; Yugoslavia (now Serbia): 22/5/1971 (de facto) and 12/6/1973 (de jure); Malta: 8/9/1973 (de facto) and 21/9/1973 (de jure)	Cuba: 11/6/1969; Chile: 8/9/1972; Guyana: 19/4/1975	Algeria: 11/6/1969; United Arab Republic (now Egypt): 16/6/1969; Mauritania: 17/6/1969; Sudan: 19/6/1969; Tanzania: 16/1/1970; Somalia: 11/4/1970 (de facto) and 15/2/1972 (de jure); Mali: 28/6/1969 (de facto) and 25/2/1972 (de jure); Uganda: 2/8/1972 (de facto) and 9/2/1973 (de jure); Dahomey (now Benin): 16/3/1973; Burundi: 16/4/1973; Senegal: 3/7/1973 (de facto) and 5/7/1973 (de jure); Guinea: 5/2/1972 (de facto) and 25/7/1973 (de jure); Zambia: 8/9/1973; Cameroon: 6/10/1973; Guinea-Bissau: 28/9/1973 (de factp) and 20/5/1974 (de jure); Gabon: 17/10/1973 (de facto) and 9/1/1975 (de jure); Equatorial Guinea: 30/9/1972 (de facto) and 17/1/1975 (de jure); Libya: 15/4/1975	None	40
Before the formal reunification with the Democratic Republic of Vietnam (2/7/1976)	Japan: 7/5/1975; Nepal: 15/5/1975; Jordan: 18/5/1975; Burma (now Myanmar): 30/5/1975; Sri Lanka: 14/7/1970 (de facto) and 24/6/1975 (de jure); Pakistan: 8/11/1972 (de facto) and 1/7/1975 (de jure); Malaysia: 4/7/1975; Indonesia: 29/7/1975; Laos: 12/8/1975; Iran: 27/11/1975; Kuwait: 10/1/1976	Denmark: 1/7/1970 (de facto) and 2/5/1975 (de jure); Norway: 13/8/1970 (de facto) and 2/5/1975 (de jure); Italy: 13/5/1975; France: 14/5/1975; Britain: 23/6/1975; Switzerland: 15/1/1975 (limited) and 26/6/1975 (de jure); Finland: 25/10/1973 (de facto) and 4/7/1975 (de jure); Belgium: 9/7/1975; Luxembourg: 10/7/1975; Austria: 15/7/1975; Ireland: 15/8/1975; Sweden: 1969 (limited) and 8/9/1975 (de jure); Cyprus: 29/11/1975	Mexico: 26/5/1975; Canada: 25/6/1975; Panama: 28/8/1975	Ivory Coast: 6/10/1975; Rwanda: 15/11/1975; Nigeria: 25/5/1976	Australia: 6/5/1975; New Zealand: 5/11/1975	32
Total	20	23	6	21	2	72
Unconfirmed recognitions or relations	Afghanistan; South Yemen (now Yemen)	Netherlands		Malagasy (now Madagascar); Zaire (now DR Congo); PR Congo (now R Congo), but recognized NLF on 12/6/1968		6

A total of 72 countries recognized the PRG of the RSV throughout its existence. Besides there are 6 countries with unconfirmed recognitions (Afghanistan, South Yemen, Netherlands, Malagasy, Zaire and PR Congo) due to lack of proper sources.

== Culture ==
=== Music ===
The national anthem of the Government was Liberate the South (Vietnamese: Giải phóng miền Nam). The song was written in 1961 by Lưu Hữu Phước (1921–1989) and adopted at that time as the anthem of the National Liberation Front of South Vietnam (Viet Cong).

In 1966, Lưu Hữu Phước wrote a military song March on Saigon (Tiến về Sài Gòn) as an encouragement the soldiers going to attack Saigon in the Tet Offensive. The song was spread again during the fall of Saigon.

=== Photos ===
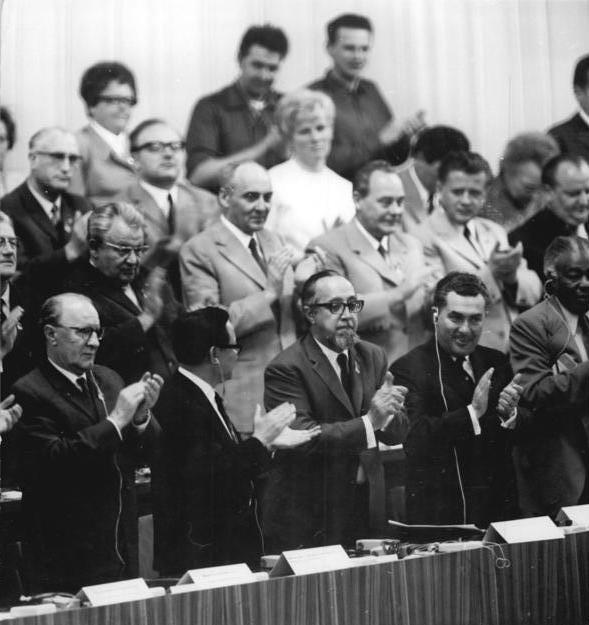
János Kádár and Nguyễn Văn Hiếu at SED party conference in East Berlin, 16 June 1971

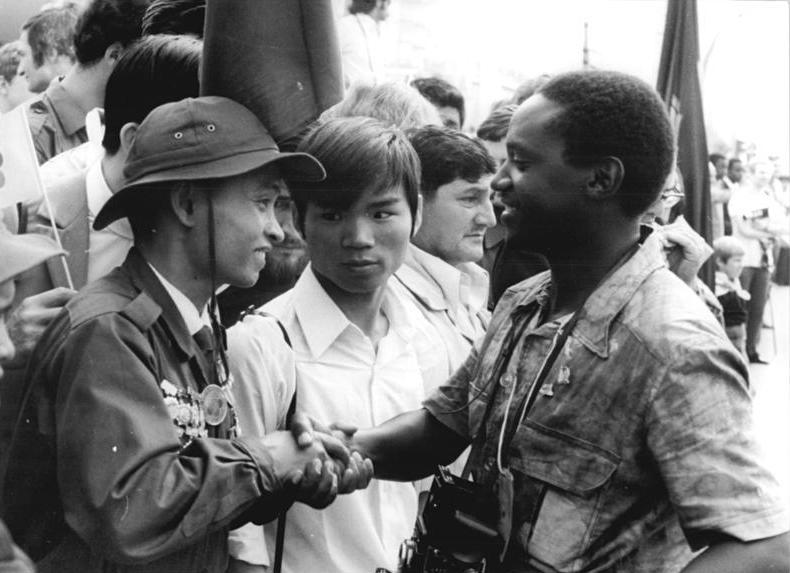
A youth representative of the PRG greets a young man from a Soviet-aligned unidentified African nation. Both are attending a 1973 World Youth Conference held in East Germany and organised by the Free German Youth.

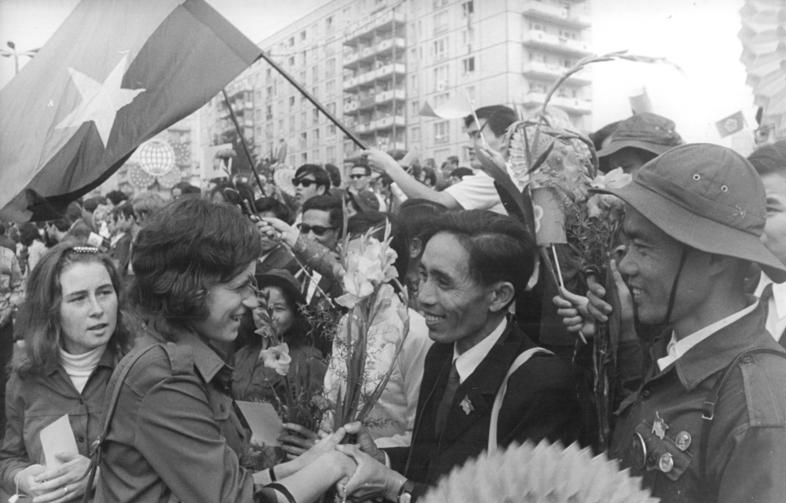
1973 World Youth Conference held in East Berlin, 4 August 1973

Signes of two primers Nguyễn Duy Trinh (North) and Nguyễn Thị Bình (South) at the Paris Peace Accords, 27 January 1973

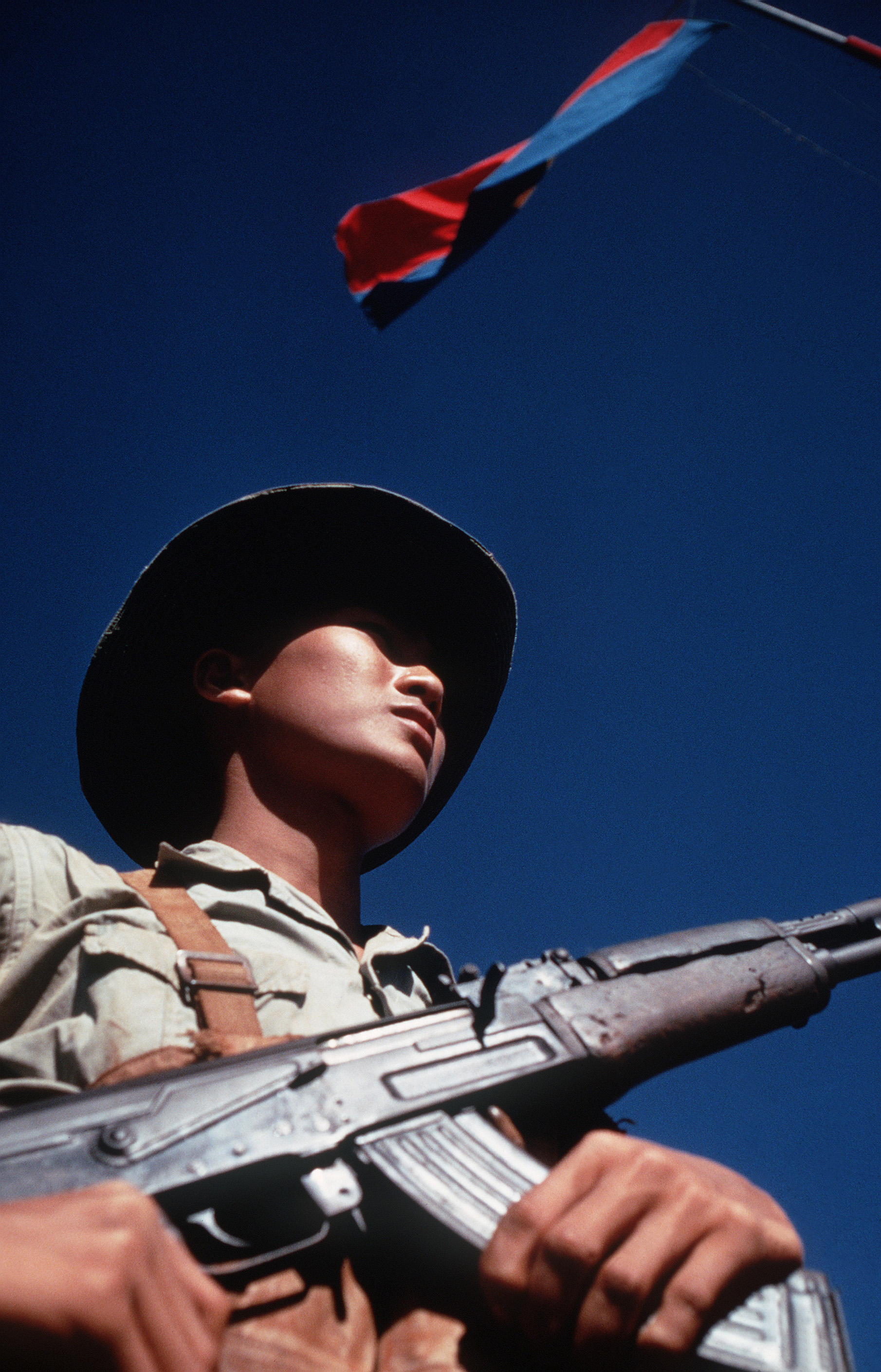
NLF soldier on 12 February 1973

== See also ==
- Vietnam War
- Geneva Accords

Preceded by Republic of Việt Nam	Provisional Revolutionary Government; 1975–1976	Succeeded by Socialist Republic of Vietnam
