= Political organizations and armed forces in Vietnam =

The following is a list of political organizations and armed forces in Vietnam, since 1912:

== 1912–1945 ==
- Việt Nam Quang Phục Hội (Vietnam Restoration League), 1912–39, led by Phan Bội Châu
- Vietnam People's Progressive Party (1923–?)
- Tâm Tâm Xã, 1923–25, led by Hồ Tùng Mậu (1896–1951), Lê Hồng Sơn (1899–1933), Phạm Hồng Thái
- Đảng Lập hiến Đông Dương (Constitutionalist Party – Parti Constitutionaliste Indochinois), 1923–39, led by Bùi Quang Chiêu (1872–1945), Nguyễn Phan Lon (1889–1960), Duong Van Giao (1892–1945)
- Hội Việt Nam Cách mạng Thanh niên (Vietnamese Revolutionary Youth League), 1925–29, led by Nguyễn Ái Quốc, Hồ Tùng Mậu, Lê Hồng Sơn, Lê Hồng Phong, Lê Duy Điếm (1906–30)
- Đảng Thanh niên Cao vọng (Nguyễn An Ninh Association), 1925–29, led by Nguyễn An Ninh
- Tân Việt Revolutionary Party (Vietnam Restoration, Vietnam Revolutionary Party, New Vietnam Revolutionary Party), 1925–30, led by Đào Duy Anh (1904–88) and Tôn Quang Phiệt (1900–73)
- Thanh niên Đảng, 1925, led by Trần Huy Liệu (1901–69)
- Đông Dương Lao động Đảng, in Cochinchina, 1926–29, led by Cao Triều Phát (1889–1956)
- Đảng Việt Nam Độc lập, 1927–29, left-wing, led by Nguyễn Thế Truyền (1898–1969), Tạ Thu Thâu
- New Vietnam Party (1927–?)
- Vietnamese Revolutionary Youth League (Việt Nam Thanh Niên Cách Mệnh Đồng Chí Hội) (1925–1929)
- Việt Nam Quốc Dân Đảng (Vietnam Nationalist Party), Tonkin, has Paramilitary forces (Yên Bái mutiny), 1945–49 pro-Republic of China/Nationalist Chinese forces, and Bảo Đại since 1947. Has military forces (Dân Quốc quân in Tonkin, Annam, Cochinchina, Anti-French in Cochinchina 1945), conflict with Viet Minh since 1945. Minor joined with Viet Minh anti-French
- Communist Party of Indochina, 1929–30, Notable members and led: Trịnh Đình Cửu (1906–90), Ngô Gia Tự (1908–35), Nguyễn Đức Cảnh (1908–32), Trần Văn Cung (1906–77), Đỗ Ngọc Du (1907–38),...(first communist cell in French Indochina)
- Communist Party of Annam, 1929–30, led by Châu Vǎn Liêm (1902–30), Nguyễn Thiệu (1903–89), Hồ Tùng Mậu, Lê Hồng Sơn
- Communist League of Indochina, established in 1930, Notable members: Trần Hữu Chương, Nguyễn Khoa Vǎn, Võ Nguyên Giáp, Nguyễn Chí Diểu,...
- Communist Party of Vietnam, led uprisings (armed struggle) in Nghệ An, Hà Tĩnh,...(1930–31), in Bắc Sơn District (1940), Cochinchina (1940), and 1945, founded the Democratic Republic of Vietnam. Vietnam People's Army with First Indochina War anti-France and army Bảo Đại,... (VPA in the Laos, Cambodia since 1947, support Lao Issara, Neo Lao Issara/Pathet Lao, Khmer Issarak and United Issarak Front ), Vietnam War anti-USA and South Vietnam Government (and support Neo Lao Hak Sat (Lao Patriotic Front), Khmer Rouge and Sihanouk), Cambodian–Vietnamese War (1975–89), Sino-Vietnamese War (1979–89),... led by Central Committee of the CPV.
- Trotskyist Movement (1931–46), in Cochinchina, led by Ta Thu Thau, in Tonkin led by Ho Huu Tuong (1910–80)
- Vietnam Restoration League (1931)
- Socialist Party (1936–)
- Democratic Party (1937–)
- Vietnam National Restoration League (Việt Nam Phục quốc Đồng minh Hội) (1939–1951)
- League for the National Restoration of Vietnam (Việt Nam Phục quốc Đồng minh Hội), officially established in 1939, led by Cường Để, Nguyễn Thượng Hiền, Nguyễn Hải Thần, Ho Hoc Lam (1883?–1942), Tran Trong Khac, has military force (Việt Nam Kiến quốc Quân) returned from China with Imperial Japanese Army, attack on Lạng Sơn and Bắc Giang 1940, against French. League pro-Japanese, and joined with Cao Dai. Revived in 1947, and urged reconciliation between Ho Chi Minh and Bảo Đại, to 1951 when Cường Để died
- Đại Việt Quốc gia Xã hội Đảng (The National Socialist Party), Tonkin, 1936–46, led by Nguyễn Xuân Tiếu, Trần Trọng Kim, pro-Japanese
- Đảng Dân chủ Đông Dương (Cochinchinese Democratic Party),1937–39, led by Nguyễn Văn Thinh
- Đại Việt Dân chính Đảng (Great Annam Democratic Party), 1938–45, led by Nguyễn Tường Tam (1905–63)
- Vietnam Revolutionary Party (Đảng Nhân dân Cách mạng)/ Vietnam National Party, 1939–41, led by Trần Văn Ân (1903–2002)
- Nationalist Party of Greater Vietnam, 1939–75, led by Trương Tử Anh, pro-Japanese (to 1945), has military forces in Tonkin, Annam, Cochinchina, anti-French and Viet Minh, since 1954 anti-government of Ngô Đình Diệm in Central and South Vietnam, to 1963.
- Viet Minh (League for the Independence of Vietnam), included: The Indochinese Communist Party, The New Vietnam Party, The Vietnam Revolutionary Youth League, Vietnam Nationalist Party (a part)...Has military forces in Tonkin ("Cứu quốc quân"-1940, "Việt Nam Tuyên truyền Giải phóng quân" −1944, joined in 1945 named the Liberation Army – Giải phóng quân), Annam (The Ba Tơ Guerrilla Unit, Ba Tơ District, March 1945) and Paramilitary forces in Cochinchina (Liberation Youth,...). After August Revolution (that followed by the foundation of the Democratic Republic of Vietnam) in 1945, found "Vệ quốc quân" (National Guard – army of the Democratic Republic of Vietnam) in Tonkin, Annam. In Cochinchina, armed forces and Paramilitary forces of Viet Minh were participants Southern Resistance War along with National Guard, army Bình Xuyên (closely with Viet Minh), The Liberation Youth and Vanguard Youth (of the Viet Minh), minor armed forces of Cao Đài, Hòa Hảo, and Vietnam Nationalist Party. Liberation Army of Viet Minh in Cochinchina joined with National Guard 1946–48. National Guard was named the Vietnamese National Army (1946) and was referred to as the Vietnamese People's Army, since 1950, led by Communist Party.
- The Liberation League
- Việt Nam Cách mệnh Đồng minh Hội (Vietnam Revolutionary League), established in 1942, included: The Vietnam Nationalist Party (Việt Nam Quốc Dân Đảng), The Vietnam Restoration League (Viet Nam Phuc Quoc Dong Minh Hoi), The Great Vietnam Nationalist Party (Dai Viet Quoc Dan Dang), The Viet Minh (to 1944), pro-Republic of China. Has military forces in Tonkin. League was revived in 1947, pro-Bảo Đại
- The Vietnam National Liberation League, 1942
- The Vietnam Patriots' Party (Việt Nam Ái quốc Đảng), in Cochinchina, pro-Japanese
- The Youth Justice Association
- The Youth Patriots
- Đại Việt Phục hưng Hội, 1942–45, led by Ngô Đình Diệm
- Đại Việt Duy Dân, in Tonkin, 1943–46, led by Lý Đông A (1921–47), has minor paramilitary forces
- Democratic Party of Vietnam, 1944–88, led by Dương Đức Hiền (1916–63), Nghiêm Xuân Yêm (1913–2001), anti-French, closely with Communist Party. Disputed with Communist Party in Cochinchina, Hải Dương (after August Revolution) a time.
- The Great Religion of the Third Amnesty (Đại Đạo Tam Kỳ Phổ Độ). Since 1943, has pro-Japanese army. After August revolution, closely with Viet Minh a time. Group of Cao Trieu Phat anti-French, closely with Viet Minh, group of Pham Cong Tac pro-French. After 1954, army Cao Đài anti-Ngô Đình Diệm, minor joined Viet Cong
- The Hòa Hảo Buddhist Sect (Phật Giáo Hòa Hảo), led by Huynh Phu So, has army since 1945–46, anti-French, after pro-French, minor joined with Viet Minh. Since 1954, anti-Ngô Đình Diệm, minor joined Viet Cong
- Đại Việt Quốc gia Cách mệnh Ủy viên Hội, 1945
- National Unified Front, in Cochinchina (August 1945), included: National Independence Vietnam Party (Việt Nam Quốc gia Độc lập Đảng), Vanguard Youth, Doan the Cao Đài, Phat Giao Hòa Hảo, Intellectual Group, Federation of Functionaries, Buddhist League, The Struggle group of Trotskyist Movement, to be in disagreements with Viet Minh, exception Vanguard Youth joined with Viet Minh in the August Revolution
- Union National Front, formed in Nanking, China in February, 1947, by Vietnam Nationalist Party, Vietnamese Democratic Socialist Party and Vietnam Revolutionary League (Dong Minh Hoi) leaders,... had armed force anti-Viet Minh, pro-Bảo Đại
- Youth for National Liberation
- Vanguard Youth/Advance Guard Youth, has paramilitary forces pro-Japanese. After, Vanguard Youth joined with Viet Minh
- The Vietnam National Independence Party (Việt Nam Quốc gia Độc lập Đảng), in Cochinchina, 1945–46, Trần Văn Ân, Nguyễn Văn Sâm (?–1947), Hồ Văn Ngà, Phan Khắc Sửu, pro-Japanese

== 1946–1954 ==
- Socialist Party of Vietnam, 1946–88, led by Phan Tư Nghĩa (born 1910), Nguyen Xien (1907–97) anti-French
- League for the National Union of Vietnam (Hội Liên hiệp quốc dân Việt Nam/Liên Việt), 1946–51, led by Bùi Bằng Đoàn (1889–1955), Huỳnh Thúc Kháng, Tôn Đức Thắng, included: Viet Minh, Democratic Party of Vietnam, Socialist Party of Vietnam, Marxism Research Association, Vietnam Nationalist Party and Vietnam Revolutionary League (since August 1946, minor group in Vietnam Nationalist Party and Vietnam Revolutionary League)...
- Vietnamese Democratic Socialist Party, 1946 in Cochinchina, led by Huỳnh Phú Sổ, after anti-Viet Minh, a party of Republic of Vietnam
- Bình Xuyên, has armed forces anti-French (1945–46), after divided, minor joined Viet Minh (group Dương Văn Hà). Since 1954 group pro-Bảo Đại and France of Lê Văn Viễn anti-Ngô Đình Diệm. After, a minor group joined Viet Cong (group Võ Văn Môn).
- Monarchist Party, formed 1945, in Annam (Central Vietnam)
- Popular Movement, in Tonkin (?–1949)
- Vietnamese Nationalist Youth Alliance, in Tonkin
- Pays Montagnard du Sud-Indochinois, Fédération Thaï/Pays Taï, Territoire Autonome Nung, Territoire Autonome Muong, Territoire Autonome Tho,... has armed force in army of Bảo Đại or Union Indochinoise/Indochine française, to 1954
- Vietnam Catholic League (Việt Nam Liên đoàn Công giáo), 1945, led by Lê Hữu Từ (1896–1967), Nguyen Manh Ha, supported the Democratic Republic of Vietnam in 1945 and 1946. Ngô Đình Diệm led the League into the National Union Front. The Catholic Militias anti-Viet Minh in Tonkin, Bến Tre Province.
- Cao Đài League, led by Phạm Công Tắc, pro-Japanese, Cường Để
- Buddhist Group (Tỉnh đồ cư sĩ), overseas Chinese community in Cochinchina, pro-Bảo Đại
- Vietnam National Rally (Việt Nam quốc gia liên hiệp), 1947 – led by Lê Văn Hoạch, monarchism
- Indochinese Democratic Party, 1946–, pro-French
- Cochinchinese Democratic Party, pro-French, led by Nguyễn Văn Thinh
- Popular Front of Indochina, pro-French
- Popular Movement of Cochinchina, pro-French
- Democratic League, 1947 in Cochinchina
- Independents, 1946, led by Hoang Minh Chau (in National Assembly)
- Renaissance Party, 1953–63, South Vietnam, led by Trần Văn Hương
- Cần lao Party, 1954–63, South Vietnam, support the Ngô Đình Diệm

== 1955–1975 ==
- New Greater Vietnam Party, South Vietnam, 1964–75, led by Nguyễn Ngọc Huy (1924–90)
- Đại Việt Cách mạng Đảng (Revolutionary Greater Vietnam Party), South Vietnam, 1965–75, led by Hà Thúc Ký (1920–2008)
- National Social Democratic Party, 1967–75, in South Vietnam, led by Nguyễn Văn Thiệu, Nguyễn Văn Ngân
- Việt Nam Nhân xã Cách mạng Đảng, in South Vietnam, 1967–75, led by Trương Công Cừu, since 1970 divided into several parts
- Dan Viet Progressive Party, in South Vietnam
- Đại Việt Duy dân đảng, in South Vietnam
- Đảng Công Nông Việt Nam (Peasants and Workers Party/Cần Lao Party), in South Vietnam, 1969–75, led by Trần Quốc Bửu
- National Social Democratic Front, South Vietnam, included: Democratic Party, Việt Nam Nhân xã Cách mạng Đảng, Việt Nam Dân chủ Xã hội Đảng,... pro-government bloc, 1968–75, led by Nguyễn Văn Thiệu
- Đảng Cộng Hòa Xã Hội, of Cao Đài, in South Vietnam
- Đảng Dân Xã, of Christians, in South Vietnam
- Forces for National Reconciliation (Lực Lượng Hòa Giải Hòa Hợp Dân Tộc), in South Vietnam, led by Vũ Văn Mẫu (1914–98)
- United Front for the Liberation of Oppressed Races, 1964–92, guerrilla group
- National Liberation Front for South Vietnam (NLF), 1960 – January 1977, has Liberation Army of South Vietnam, led by Workers Party of Vietnam
- Radical Socialist Party of the South Vietnam, in NLF, 1961–75, led by Nguyễn Văn Hiếu (1922–91), Nguyễn Văn Tiến
- Democratic of Party of the South Vietnam, in NLF, divided since Democratic Party of Vietnam (founded 1944) –1975, led by Trần Bửu Kiếm (born 1921), Huỳnh Tấn Phát
- People's Revolutionary Party of South Vietnam, in NLF, 1962–75 led by Central Committee of Workers Party of Vietnam, chairman: Võ Chí Công, general Secretary: Nguyễn Văn Linh, was the southern branch of the Workers Party of Vietnam
- Alliance of National, Democratic and Peace Forces of Việt Nam (Liên minh các Lực lượng Dân tộc, Dân chủ và Hòa bình Việt Nam), 1968, led by Trịnh Đình Thảo (1901–86), merged Vietnamese Fatherland Front of North Vietnam, National Liberation Front of South Vietnam 1977

== 1975–present ==
- National United Front for the Liberation of Vietnam, 1982–87, has Armed forces, Hoàng Cơ Minh, an illegal organization by the Vietnamese government.
- Front of Patriotic Forces for the Liberation of Viet Nam (Mặt trận Thống nhất các Lực lượng Yêu nước Giải phóng Việt Nam), 1980–84, Lê Quốc Túy and Mai Văn Hạnh, had armed force, an illegal organization by the Vietnamese government

== See also ==
- List of central officeholders in the Communist Party of Vietnam
- List of Vietnamese political parties
- Military history of Vietnam
