= Trần Thị Liên =

Vietnamese revolutionary

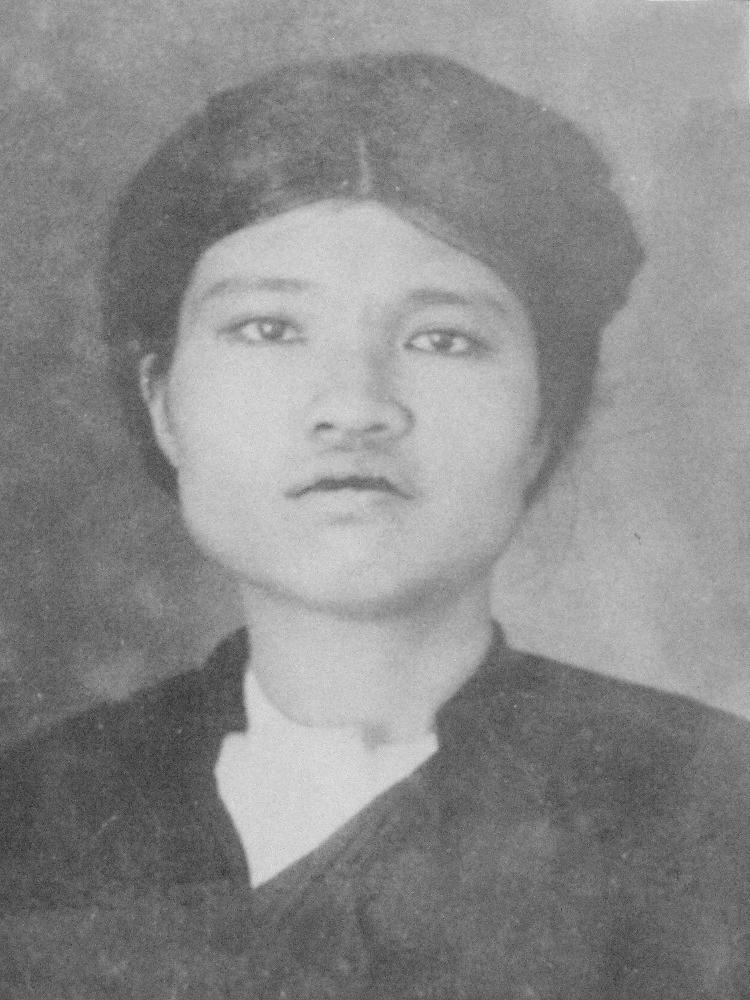
- Born: 1910; Nghệ An Province, Annam, French Indochina
- Died: 7 April 1991 (aged 80–81)
- Other names: Sơn, Tuyết, Yến
- Organisation: Women's Liberation Association (now known as Vietnamese Women's Union)
- Political party: New Revolutionary Party of Vietnam; Communist Party of Indochina
- Spouse: Trần Văn Cung (m. 1928; died 1977)
- Relatives: Trần Văn Quang (brother-in-law)
- Awards: Order of Independence

Trần Thị Liên (1910–1991) was a Vietnamese revolutionary. Trần Thị Liên was born in Yên Nghi village (now in Vinh), Nghệ An Province. Her father was a geo-surveyor while her mother was a small merchant in Vinh. Liên attended and finished Nguyễn Trường Tộ primary school in Vinh.

In the mid-1920s, Trần Thị Liên joined the New Revolutionary Party of Vietnam where she met and then married Trần Văn Cung - a member of Vietnam Revolutionary Youth League, founded by Nguyễn Ái Quốc - in 1928. In late 1928, Liên and Cung went to Hanoi. Cung then became secretary of the first communist cell in Vietnam and a co-founder of Communist Party of Indochina (CPI). Liên joined the CPI and returned to Nghệ An along with Cung.

In the late 1929, Cung was caught by French colonial government and sentenced penal servitude for life in French Guiana. He was at first jailed in Lao Bảo Prison. In the late 1931, Liên was caught and imprisoned for a year in Vinh Prison. Her first child died during her imprison time. In October 1935, Liên was caught again while distributing flyers. She was imprisoned the second time for 2 years. Liên and Cung were freed from their imprisonment in July 1936 after political pressure from the Popular Front on the colonial administration in Indochina.

She was awarded the Order of Independence. Liên died on 7 July 1991 in Hanoi.

== See also ==
- Trần Văn Cung
