= Nghệ-Tĩnh Soviets =

Series of uprisings in early 1930s led by Vietnamese communists

Date	1930–1931
Location	Nghệ An and Hà Tĩnh Province
Result	French and Nguyễn dynasty victory: Communist uprising suppressed

Belligerents
Vietnamese Communists; Communist Party of Vietnam (until October 1930); Communist Party of Indochina; Communist Party of Annam; Communist League of Indochina; Indochinese Communist Party (from October 1930); Red Self-Defense Force	French Indochina; French Protectorate of Annam; Nguyễn dynasty

Commanders and leaders
Trần Phú †; Nguyễn Đức Cảnh (executed); Nguyễn Phong Sắc (executed); Lê Viết Mao (executed); Lê Viết Thuật; Nguyễn Văn Uy; Nguyễn Thị Nhuyễn	Pierre Marie Antoine Pasquier (Governor-General of French Indochina); Aristide Eugène Le Fol (Resident-Superior of Annam); Trần Ủ Trần Hiến; Trần Dang; Trần Tiêu; Lê Toan; Lê Văn Trí; Hà Văn Bân; Nguyễn Văn Liêm

Casualties and losses
1,300-1,760+ killed	200 killed

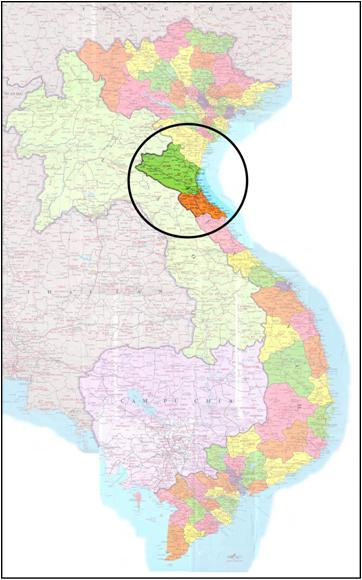
Location of Nghệ An (Green) and Hà Tĩnh (Orange) in Vietnam.

The uprising of the Nghệ-Tĩnh soviets (Vietnamese: Phong trào Xô Viết Nghệ-Tĩnh) was the series of uprisings, strikes and demonstrations in 1930-31 by Vietnamese peasants and workers led by the communists against the colonial French regime, the mandarinate, and landlords. Nghệ-Tĩnh (Vietnamese: [ŋêˀ tǐŋˀ]) is a compound name for the two central provinces, Nghệ An and Hà Tĩnh, where the revolt mainly took place. Demonstrations expressed the general anger against French colonial policies such as heavy taxation and state monopolies on certain goods, as well as the corruption and perceived unfairness of local notables and mandarins. Demonstrators, while violent, were armed with little more than basic farm weapons, and were brutally suppressed by the overwhelming military strength of the French. The revolt waned by the second half of 1931 due to famine and suppression.

== Sequence of events ==
The revolt started in March 1930 when five strikes in occurred in Vinh (the provincial capital of Nghệ An) and Bến Thuỷ within two months. The demonstrations spread quickly to the rural areas (districts of Thanh Chương, Nam Đàn and Nghi Lộc) and peasants demanded a moratorium on the payment of personal taxes, for an end to corvée labour and for rich landowners to return the communal lands which they had taken away. When demands were ignored, demonstrations escalated and they soon spread to the adjacent province of Hà Tĩnh.

Economic hardship as well as discontentment with the French colonial administration and the local Annamite authorities had already been growing prior to these strikes and it was only a matter of time before two of the most explosive provinces in Vietnam would rise in protest yet again. Communist groups such as the Communist Party of Annam, Communist League of Indochina and the Communist Party of Indochina had also already been mobilising workers and peasants and fanning discontent in these areas. In 1929, pagodas and places of meeting within the village were burnt down by radicals in the rural areas who saw these as symbols of the power of superstition and exploitative village notables. Tensions between the authorities and the students had also increased as a number of Thanh Nien, Tan Viet and other communist student activists were arrested. Also, there was a great deal of mobilization in both Nghệ An and Hà Tĩnh, particularly by communist groups, in the form of mass organizations, trade unions, peasant associations, and women’s and youth groups. These various factors were the historical conditions under which the strikes of early 1931 and the demonstrations to follow occurred.

In late April 1930, the Annam regional committee of the Communist Party of Vietnam (CPV) (Vietnamese: Đảng Cộng sản Việt Nam) planned three major demonstrations in Nghệ An in alignment with other communist parties around the world commemorating May Day. (The Vietnamese Communist Party was the party under which the three competing communist factions – namely the Communist Party of Annam, Communist League of Indochina and the Communist Party of Indochina – had been reunited earlier in February of the same year. A few months later, in October 1930, the party would rename itself the Indochinese Communist Party (ICP) (Vietnamese: Đảng Cộng sản Đông Dương). Other disturbances against the colonial regime, particularly the Yên Bái mutiny organized by the Việt Nam Quốc Dân Đảng in February had encouraged these groups to organize and mobilize the masses with the eventual goal of revolution. The three demonstrations of April were dispersed when the French-led garde indigène (native gendarmerie) fired on the crowds killing a total of 27 men, women and children and injuring many more.

August 1930 saw further attacks on county offices and the depots of the French alcohol monopoly – a much detested colonial institution which banned the Vietnamese from producing their own alcohol and enforced the selling of wine produced by the state and the privileged few who held the monopoly.

On 12 September, another mass demonstration in Hưng Nguyên (three kilometres from Vinh) took place. Le Fol (Resident-Superior of Annam) had earlier requested for a squadron of planes to be sent to Vinh to help in repressing the strikes. These same planes dropped six bombs on the demonstrators, killing 140-200 people and wounding hundreds more.

The following day, there was an outcry at the court in Huế. In addition to this, the fear of public opinion in France on the severity of the repression against largely unarmed demonstrators forced Le Fol to prohibit the use of bombing. Nevertheless, during the months to follow, the French Foreign Legion and French-led Vietnamese troops reoccupied forts used at the turn of the century for “pacification” and established new ones. By early 1931, there were 68 military posts in Nghệ An and 54 in Hà Tĩnh. The degree of repression surpassed that experienced at Cổ Am during the Yên Bái mutiny and the brutality had anything but decreased.

After this, most of Nghệ An exploded. Anger and discontent continued to grow with the increasing repression and ignorance of demands. Peasants and workers demonstrated against county offices and even military posts, burned down administrative buildings, town halls and railway stations, destroy tax and other tax registers, and pillaged police stations. Some mandarins took a conciliatory stance towards the movement through fear or sympathy, and because in many parts the movement was gaining strength and the initially weak colonial police presence was only being reinforced as the revolt progressed. Certain village notables also often refused to suppress the disorders and sometimes joined in. Where mandarins and village notables had not fled or cooperated, many were beaten, assassinated or executed. It is worth noting that much of the rebellious action could only aim indirectly against the French who were present in very few numbers in these provinces, and it was generally the Vietnamese landlords, the despised mandarins and native officials who worked for the French at the lower echelons of the administration who received the brunt of the violence.

On 7 November 1930, the anniversary of the October Revolution, 1500 people revolted in Phú Diên and 600 more attacked the post at Can Lộc (Hà Tĩnh).

By January 1931, the French were able to redeploy their forces and their repression became more effective. The police detached from Northern Vietnam (then also known by the French as Tonkin) set up an efficient dossier system and issued identity cards to the population in the affected areas as a means of controlling the population. A new, pro-French governor Nguyen Khoa Ky was also appointed to Nghệ An. As a result of massive French pressure in the eastern parts of Nghệ An including Vinh, the provincial capital, weakened the movement considerably by the spring of 1931.

The revolt intensified in the Sông Cả valley in the west and in the adjacent province of Hà Tĩnh, however, and a new wave of demonstrations broke out around May Day. Just two months before in the month of March, public anger in Hue, Saigon and France at the brutality of the French Foreign Legion had forced the authorities to restrict it to the barracks, providing a lull during which the movement was able to regain some strength. During the May Day demonstrations, they had returned to duty and over 500 people were killed.

Public reaction to this atrocity led to Le Fol’s dismissal and the administration promised an official Commission of Inquiry. However, Yves Chatel who took over Le Fol’s residency only proved to be more brutal subsequently and the Commission of Inquiry whitewashed the repression. In May 1931, mass violence erupted yet again. By this time however, fierce retaliation from the French, the arrests and executions of numerous demonstrators and party cadres as well as the worsening famine caused the revolt to be on the wane.

By early 1932, tens of thousands of peasants had been put in prisons or makeshift concentration camps with high mortality rates and 99 percent of the cadres of the ICP had been killed or arrested. Bernal estimates that over 1300 men, women and children were killed and around a thousand people died of disease and malnutrition in the prisons and concentration camp. On the French side, less than 200 soldiers were killed, of whom only one was French. The Sûreté ̣(the intelligence branch of the colonial French police) recorded 161 demonstrations and attacks from 1 May 1930 to 11 September 1931.

== French retaliation ==
The retaliatory action of the French regime under Le Fol (résident supérieur of Annam) was characterized by brutality. Aerial bombardments and the firing of machine guns were used to disperse demonstrations. Villages were burned down and cadres of political groups were executed when caught. This was largely the work of the French Foreign Legion, reinforced by the colonial infantry and the Garde Indigène. Although the French forces were spread relatively thinly throughout Vietnam, they were consolidated in central Vietnam during this period to repress the uprisings, and the superiority of their weaponry clearly overpowered the largely unarmed demonstrators.

It is reasonable to believe that at least certain quarters within the French administration were aware of the excesses that would occur given the overwhelming superiority of their military strength against the peasants and workers. Nevertheless, such brutal tactics of repression were pursued. A local French newspaper of the time, Dépêche d’Indochine, as early as 16 January 1930, wrote the following in response to a general French demand for revenge against nationalists who then had only committed a few isolated acts of terrorism: “There is another means to make oneself feared: terror. Corporal punishment, tortures, brutal methods will teach the crowds cowardly enough to listen to the inciters of rebellion that we, too, are terrible in repression and that the last word will be ours.” In total, over a thousand Vietnamese lives were lost, but only one Frenchman was killed in the uprisings in 1930 and another during the military action against the rebellious provinces in 1931. Buttinger writes, “There is indeed no darker year in the entire period of French rule in Vietnam than 1931.”

== Village peasant sections and soviets ==
There were consequently severe disruptions to local administration. By September 1930, all administration below the county level disappeared or was paralysed in some counties, as many village notables were forced to retire, discredited both by their economic exploitation of the villages and their relations with the Annamite administration and the French. Peasant associations, calling themselves “village peasant sections” (Vietnamese: xã bộ nông), were formed rather spontaneously throughout the two provinces to fill this vacuum and were the only form of organization available in some places. These associations have been often remembered as the “Soviets”, or more specifically, the “Nghe Tinh Soviets” (Vietnamese: Xô Viết Nghệ Tĩnh), although this was only a name given to them by the leaders of the Communist Party.

These were usually formed by calling for a meeting of village residents in the communal temple (đình) and electing a directing committee to replace the existing village council of elders. Most of the new soviets were dominated by the poorer peasants in the village. As a result, there was much pressure to seize communal lands earlier confiscated by wealthy families and return them to the peasants. There were also calls for the annulment of local taxes, the lowering of rents, and the distribution of excess rice to the needy. Other activities included the digging of wells and dykes and the establishment of schools. In addition, village "self-defence squadrons", usually armed with sticks, spears or knives, were formed for self-defence purposes.

The ICP provided leadership to these associations. Bernal notes that the central committee was not in favour of this rapid dismantling of county administrations and the setting up of “soviets” because the “time for revolution was not yet ripe”. However, since these peasant associations were mushrooming in many places, the Central Committee soon changed its approach and advised local Communist members to covertly direct and support the peasant association leaders in the soviets to “maintain and strengthen the influence of the party”. However, these associations tended to reassert traditional values in general, and did not establish new ones. In the case of the redistribution of land, for example, the local party leadership attempted to enforce a relatively moderate policy: provincial party directives called for the seizure of previously communal lands, but not for the confiscation of all landlords' lands. These “village peasant sections” or “soviets” survived in west Nghệ An until August 1931 and in Hà Tĩnh till the end of the year.

== Reasons for the revolt ==
It is generally agreed that it is difficult and unfruitful to isolate single causes, and there is a consensus on the conditions that facilitated the revolt. Disagreement, however, lies in what was the critical factor which pushed an otherwise relatively quiescent, albeit discontented, populace to rise up in large scale protest. Some contend that the revolt was spontaneous and reflected the anger of poor peasants and workers at deteriorating economic and social conditions, which had by 1930 surpassed a critical threshold. Others are convinced that the mobilizing and organizational efforts of local Communist cadres was a major and decisive factor in the uprising. Such differing, historical viewpoints are not surprising, for contemporary observers were similarly divided.

=== General conditions ===
==== Poverty ====
Nghệ An and Hà Tĩnh were among the poorest of the provinces inhabited by ethnic Vietnamese, with extreme variations of harvest and a shortage of land. Wealthy landlords took over communal lands as farmers were unable to repay their debts and tenancy became a common feature in rural areas. Approximately half of the rural population was landless.

==== Famine ====
Bad weather led to harvest failures; in Nghệ An, the tenth-month rice harvest of 1929 and the fifth-month harvest of 1930 were both bad, a sequence that had not occurred for over a decade. In Hà Tĩnh, the failure was less striking, although the general level of poverty was even lower. These agricultural failures intensified hatred of the French, particularly because of the latter’s unwillingness to build irrigation works, as they had in Thanh-Hoa, the province immediately to the north, and in sharp contrast to their road and rail construction in Nghệ Tĩnh.

Some believe that this persistent state of poverty and famine was what had facilitated a strong tradition of resistance and rebellion in these areas. As far back as the 19th century, there had been significant anti-French resistance there, led by patriotic scholars. To this day, the two provinces of Nghệ An and Hà Tĩnh have a reputation for having been the short fuses of Vietnam throughout history.

==== Resentment of French colonial policies ====
There was a great deal of resentment against the policies of the colonial administration which imposed a further burden on the already precarious livelihoods of the rural and urban populations. Such state policies included demands for corvée labour, monopolies on alcohol, salt and opium, and certain prohibitions such as the banning of brewing alcohol at home. Taxation was perhaps the most resented of all, as evidenced from the frequent destruction of tax registers by demonstrators during the revolt. New types of taxes were introduced over the years, such as a market tax and taxation of wood from the mountains, which was previously free.

==== Discontent with the mandarins, native officials and local notables ====
The imperial court at Hue was still in existence during this time but its power had been waning significantly. There was significant corruption among the mandarins and they were generally despised for their weakness in the face of the French and their adherence to outmoded traditions. Local village notables and local officials within the French administration benefited from colonial policy, unlike the general population, and they too came to be resented for their corruption, their unjust confiscation of communal agricultural lands and their connection to the French colonizers. Given the concentration of Frenchmen in the cities and their small presence throughout the provinces, it was the native officials who often came to be seen as the face of the colonial regime.

=== Effects of the Great Depression ===
Some scholars, including Duiker and Scott, see a more direct relation between the Great Depression and precariousness of village livelihoods during this period. They explain that the Depression exacerbated the general economic malaise of the poorer classes, citing the falling of rice prices and land values leading to a sharp drop in farm income and increasing penury. Bernal notes, however, that most of the rural population appears to have been only slightly affected during the duration of the revolt because the Great Depression only took effect in Nghệ An and Hà Tĩnh, as in the rest of Indochina, only in the mid-1930s. The depression nevertheless affected the central Vietnamese local population in some ways. Firstly, poverty and density population had led many peasants to seek employment in plantations and factories which had to retrench or reduce the wages of their workers due to a fall in global and local demand for their products. Cutbacks on commercial agriculture in Cochinchina led to the return of labourers to their homes in Nghệ An and Hà Tĩnh, exerting greater pressure on the already densely populated and famine ridden land. Secondly, the colonial regime which was more immediately affected by the downturn sharply accelerated the rate of tax increases and exaggerated the already regressive nature of taxation in order to increase state revenue.

These differing perspectives regarding the critical factor which led to the uprisings may be seen within the larger debate about the attitudes of workers and rural folk, and the reasons for which they revolt. This debate has occurred among Moral Economists, Rational Choice Theorists and Marxists among others. See James C. Scott (1977) The Moral Economy of the Peasant for a moral economy approach to explaining peasant rebellion, and Samuel Popkin (1984) The rational peasant for a Rational Choice reaction against the moral economy approach.

=== Role of the Indochinese Communist Party ===
Vietnamese historians tend to stress the importance of anti-French traditions and the strength of party organization. They insist that although there was mass enthusiasm for the movement, it was not a simple jacquerie and that it was shaped, co-ordinated and for the most part controlled by the Communist Party. The critical factor that caused the rebellion was the foundation and activities of the Communist Party, even if these themselves may have been precipitated by the international crisis of capitalism.

The three demonstrations on May Day 1930 which began the movement in Nghệ An and Hà Tĩnh were planned and organized by the party in places where they knew people had acute grievances. Their reinforcement of genuine popular feelings appears to have been crucial. The role of the ICP in revolt was that it created clear organizational links which unified and coordinated previously disparate protests, explaining and generalising individual and local discontent. Also, it explicitly linked social justice to national independence and encouraged non-literati to join and lead the national struggle.

Others scholars, on the other hand, have pointed out that when the uprising began, the communist party had yet to establish itself deeply in the areas of unrest. Although the French Sûreté attributed the revolt largely to communist activity, much of what happened was very much beyond the control of the party.

However, it is difficult to verify if the mobilizing activities of communist cadres raised the level of discontentment in these areas, even if it is recognised that they did provide a certain degree of leadership and organization in the uprisings and the village peasant sections (or soviets) which appeared during that time. During this period, correspondences between regional communist party and the Central Communist Party situated in Hong Kong show that the ICP hoped to achieve mobilization in the demonstrations of 1930 and 1931, and not full-scale revolution, which was still set in an indeterminate future at this point.

== See also ==
- Yên Bái mutiny
- Indochinese Communist Party
- Annam (French protectorate)
- French Indochina
