= Trần Văn Cung =

Vietnamese revolutionary

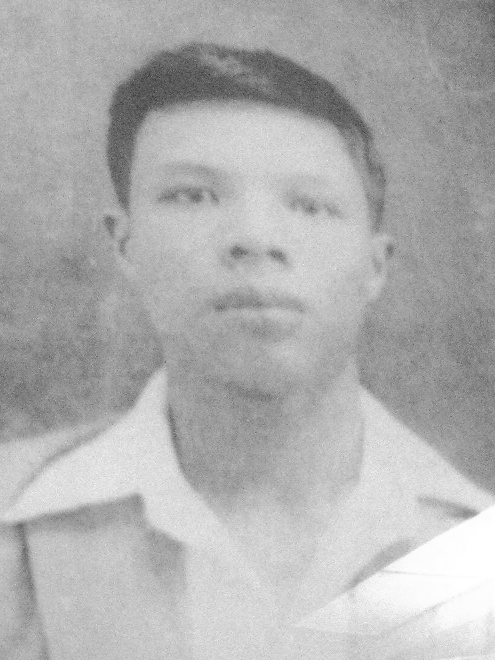
- Born: 5 May 1906; Nghệ An, Annam
- Died: 31 October 1977 (aged 71); Hanoi, Vietnam
- Political party: Communist Party of Indochina; Communist Party of Vietnam
- Movement: Vietnam Revolutionary Youth League; Viet Minh
- Spouse: Trần Thị Liên (m. 1928)
- Relatives: Trần Văn Quang (brother)

Member of the National Assembly
- In office 1946–1964
- Constituency: Nghệ An

Trần Văn Cung (Nghi Lộc, 5 May 1906 – Hanoi, 31 October 1977) was a Vietnamese revolutionary, who was the secretary of the first communist cell in Vietnam.

== Family ==
Trần Văn Cung was born 5 May 1906 in Kim Khe Trung village, Nghi Lộc District in Nghệ An Province (Annam) in 1906. Trần Văn Cung's father is Trần Văn Năng – a confucianist who was jailed by French colonial government for six months. His elder brother is Trần Văn Tăng – a teacher and revolutionist and member of New Revolutionary Party of Vietnam who was also jailed by the French and died in prison. His youngest brother is Trần Văn Quang who is a Colonel General (three-star general) of the People's Army of Vietnam. Trần Văn Cung married Trần Thị Liên.

== Vietnam Revolutionary Youth League ==
In 1926, Cung joined the Collège de Vinh where he also joined the Vietnam Restoration Association (Hội Hưng Nam). Then he was recruited by Vietnam Revolutionary Youth League (Hội Việt Nam Cách mạng Thanh niên) which founded by Ho Chi Minh. Cung went to Guangzhou to be trained by the Youth League and then returned to Vietnam and became a member of Tonkin Bureau of VARY.

In late 1928, Cung was voted to be head of Tonkin Bureau of the Youth League. In March 1929, he and other six radical members of VARY Tonkin Bureau including Nguyễn Đức Cảnh, Trịnh Đình Cửu, Đỗ Ngọc Du, Dương Hạc Đính, Ngô Gia Tự, Kim Tôn founded the first communist cell in Vietnam. Cung was voted to be the secretary of this cell. The cell's ambition was to be the core of a future communist party in Vietnam. Under the guidance by this communist cell, the congress of Hội Việt Nam Cách mạng Thanh niên's Tonkin Bureau reached a consensus of founding a communist party and voted Trần Văn Cung, Trịnh Đình Cửu and Kim Tôn to be attendees of whole Hội Việt Nam Cách mạng Thanh niên congress in Hong Kong. The congress of the Youth League was held in Hong Kong in May 1929. In the congress, Tonkin attendees led by Trần Văn Cung proposed a transforming of Hội Việt Nam Cách mạng Thanh niên into a communist party. Their proposal was rejected by Hội Việt Nam Cách mạng Thanh niên leadership then led by Hồ Tùng Mậu. Being disappointed, three Tonkin attendees made a walkout from the congress. Hội Việt Nam Cách mạng Thanh niên then expelled them from its organization.

== Communist Party of Indochina ==
On 17 June 1929, Cung led a meeting of the communist cell in which the Communist Party of Indochina (CPI) was founded. Thereafter, Cung went to central Vietnam to develop CPI's foundation there. He soon was, however, caught by French colonial government and sentenced to penal servitude for life in French Guiana. In waiting to be transported to Guiana, he was jailed in Lao Bảo Prison.

In 1936, due to activities of Popular Front, France, Cung was released from prison. He then continued participate in communist movement in Nha Trang and then in Nghe An. In early 1945, he was a co-founders of Viet Minh in Nghệ-Tĩnh. When August Revolution broke out, Cung was the secretary of Viet Minh Front in Nghệ-Tĩnh.

In 1946, Trần Văn Cung as a member of Viet Minh was elected to be member of National Assembly of Vietnam (NA). In late 1946, he was elected to be member of Standing Committee of NA. In 1957, Cung was assigned to be Party Secretary of People's University (predecessor of now National Economics University). He died on 31 October 1977. He was awarded a Medal of Resistance (Huân chương Kháng chiến) by the State of Vietnam.

== See also ==
- Communist Party of Indochina
- Trần Văn Quang
