= Bảo Lương =

Vietnamese political prisoner (1909-1976)

Bảo Lương (1909-1976) was born Nguyễn Trung Nguyệt (“faithful moon), in the rural Bình Đại District of Vietnam’s Bến Tre Province. She was a member of the Vietnamese Revolutionary Youth League, a communist group fighting against French rule in Vietnam. She became the first female political prisoner in Vietnam.

== Early life ==
Nguyễn Trung Nguyệt grew up on her parents farm in Bình Đại District. Although few girls received an education at this time, Trung Nguyệt went to an all-boys night school run by her uncle. At nine years old her family moved from Bình Đại to Rạch Giá (now Kiên Giang), and at age twelve, they again uprooted to Phước Long (now part of Bạc Liêu province). Her father, Nguyễn Văn Nhâm, was a French resistor, and told her stories of anticolonial resistance. He encouraged her to write patriotic poems and question the French rule. At her age, most young Vietnamese women were expected to be married, but Trung Nguyệt did not want to be distracted from the revolution against the French. Trung Nguyệt often tried to persuade her parents to let her leave home to engage in revolutionary activities, but they resisted. In the spring of 1927, Trung Nguyệt left home for Saigon, where she stayed with her aunt, Kim Oanh and her uncle Tôn Đức Thắng. Around the time she left home, Nguyễn Trung Nguyệt adopted the name Bảo Lương (“Precious Honesty”), which she had originally used as a pen name while writing poetry.

== Activism ==
Her uncle, Tôn Đức Thắng was the leader of the southern section of the Vietnamese Revolutionary Youth League. After four months, during which Tôn Đức Thắng assessed Bảo Lương's interest and potential, she was recruited to join the Vietnamese Revolutionary Youth League. Training for the Youth League was in Guangzhou, China, and before boarding the boat, Bảo Lương's family disguised her as a boy. Her true identity was discovered only after she gained the trust and loyalty of the other revolutionary activists on board. In Guangzhou, Bảo Lương and the other trainees attended lectures on revolutionary ideologies, evolution, and the socialist movement. At the training school, Bảo Lương wrote poetry and other articles for the cause. When her training was complete, she went back to her family in Phước Long.

Her first task was to convince her family to support her efforts in the revolution, and her parents vowed to support her and keep her secret. She went on to recruit women to join the revolution. Bảo Lương traveled throughout the Mekong Delta pretending to sell fabric. Along the way, she gathered women that supported the Revolutionary Youth League. Many of these women hoped that the revolution would lead to education reforms and the freedom to choose their own husbands. Bảo Lương then received permission to start an all-women cell of the Revolutionary Youth League. She hosted meetings that gathered women from a wide geographical area, spanning five regions. All female meetings were unprecedented at the time, and Bảo Lương's superiors warned her to be more careful. At these meetings, the women decided to use poetry to spread the anticolonial message, and used stories of exemplary women throughout history to help make their points.

== Murder on Barbier Street ==
Bảo Lương's passionate fight against French rule led her to become involved in an assassination plot. On 8 December 1928, Lê Văn Phát was found in his home on Barbier Street. He was known as Lang to the members of the Revolutionary Youth League. Lang was the chairman of the Saigon Provincial regional committee of the Revolutionary Youth League. Lang was accused of forcing a younger member of his cell to become his mistress. He also began abusing power, disrespecting orders, and missing meetings. Bảo Lương chaired the meeting where the decision to execute Lang's murder was made. She directed members at the meeting to draw ballots to see who would commit the murder and three men (including Bảo Lương's cousin) were selected. Bảo Lương drafted a love letter which was used to make sure Lang would be home at the time of the murder. Her cousin and the two other men attempted to kill Lang with poison, before slitting his throat. The Central Committee of the Revolutionary Youth League was against the murder and ordered the Saigon cell to disband. This group went on to become the Communist Party of Indochina. After Bảo Lương and her fellow Saigon cell members refused, an anonymous letter was sent to the Republic of Vietnam National Police, known as the Sûreté, that implicated Bảo Lương and other league members in the murder of Lang.

== Imprisonment and later life ==
Bảo Lương was beaten in prison, as the Sûreté tried to get her to confess. She was then moved to the Saigon Central Prison, where she awaited trial. At her trial, she spoke out to the French judge about the poor treatment of women in French Indochina and maintained her revolutionary ideas. She was found guilty and sentenced to five years in prison, but her behavior in court added three more years to her sentence. The men who committed the murder were sentenced to death. Her mentor and uncle, Tôn Đức Thắng, served a short prison sentence before becoming the president of Democratic Republic of Vietnam.

In prison, a male nurse who cared for Bảo Lương fell in love with her. Through an intermediary, the nurse (Nguyen Văn Thơm) asked her family for her hand in marriage. After being questioned by the head of the prison for his plans to marry Bảo Lương upon her release, Nguyễn Văn Thơm quit. After Bảo Lương's release, the two moved to Ô Môn and had children. She was later encouraged to rejoin the revolution, but denied the invitation to care for her children and in-laws.
