= Trần Văn Quang =

Vietnamese General

Colonel General Trần Văn Quang

Deputy Chief of General Staff
- In office 1974–1977
- President: Tôn Đức Thắng
- Minister: Võ Nguyên Giáp

Deputy Minister of Ministry of Defence
- In office 1981–1992
- President: Trường Chinh, Võ Chí Công
- Minister: Văn Tiến Dũng, Lê Đức Anh, Đoàn Khuê

Personal details
- Born: Trần Thúc Kính; 1917 Nghi Lộc, Nghệ An, Annam
- Died: 3 November 2013 (aged 95–96) Hà Nội, Socialist Republic of Vietnam
- Party: Communist Party of Indochina
- Relations: Trần Văn Cung (brother)
- Awards: Gold Star Order; Ho Chi Minh Order
- Nickname: Bảy Tiến

Military service
- Allegiance: North Vietnam; People's Army of Vietnam
- Rank: Colonel General
- Battles/wars: First Indochina War; Battle of Điện Biên Phủ; Vietnam War; Battle of Huế

Trần Văn Quang (1917 – 3 November 2013) was a colonel general (three-star general) of the People's Army of Vietnam (PAVN). He was a deputy chief of General Staff of PAVN and a deputy minister of Vietnam's Ministry of Defence. During the Battle of Dien Bien Phu, Quang was the head of Department of Operations.

== Early years ==
Born in 1917 in Nghi Lộc District, Nghệ An Province of Annam (French protectorate), Quang was a son of Trần Văn Năng – a Confucianist who was jailed by French colonial government for six months. His elder brother is Trần Văn Tăng – a teacher and revolutionist and member of New Revolutionary Party of Vietnam who was also jailed by the French and died in prison. His second elder brother is Trần Văn Cung, who was a Vietnamese revolutionary and was the secretary of the first communist cell in Vietnam. His young brother is Trần Văn Bành, who was a colonel of PAVN.

Quang joined the Communist Party of Indochina in 1936. Between 1938 and 1939, he was one of communist leaders in Saigon–Cho Lon. He was jailed by the French colonial administration in 1939, but he escaped in October 1940 and went to Nghệ An. In April 1941, he was caught again and was given a life sentence. In June 1945, he was freed.

== Military career ==
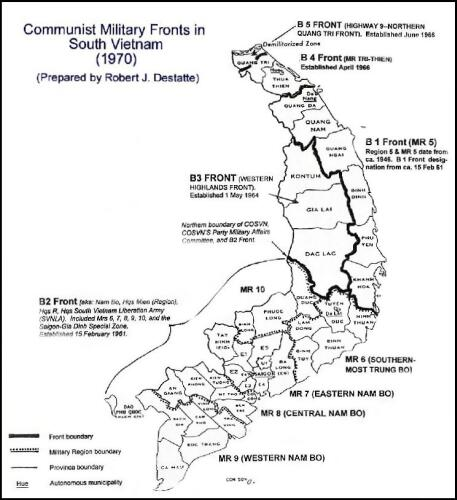
NLF Fronts and Military regions, 1970

During November 1946 and July 1947, Quang was the Commissar of Interregion IV (including 11 provinces of North Central Coast). During 1948 and 1949, Quang was the military commander and the commissar of Bình–Trị–Thiên region. In May 1950 when the 304 Division was established, Quang became the political commissar of this division.

In 1958, he became a major general and the deputy chief of General Staff. In 1961, he went to Southern of Vietnam and became a member of Central Executive Committee of the People's Revolutionary Party who was in charge of military affairs. In 1965, he became the Commander of 4th Military Region. During 1965 and 1973, Quang was the Commander cum Commissar of Trị–Thiên Military Region (B4 Front).

In 1974, he was promoted to lieutenant general. He became a deputy chief of General Staff for the second time. During 1978 and 1981, Quang was the commander of 678 Corps and the commissar of Vietnamese Voluntary Force in Laos. He became a deputy minister of Defense during 1981 and 1982 and a colonel general in 1984.

Quang died on 3 November 2013 in Hanoi.
