= Xã Đoài orange =

Orange cultivar

- Species: Citrus sinensis
- Cultivar: Xã Đoài
- Origin: Spain

The Xã Đoài orange (Cam xã Đoài, Citrus sinensis 'Xã Đoài') is a cultivar of orange of Spanish origin cultivated in Vietnam at the former Catholic settlement at Xã Đoài, modern Nghi Diên village in Nghi Lộc, Nghệ An. Xã Đoài is the name of the village, and the former Grand Séminaire de Xa-Doai, in the chữ Nôm.

== See also ==
- Green orange (Cam sành)
