= Trần Phú =

Vietnamese revolutionary

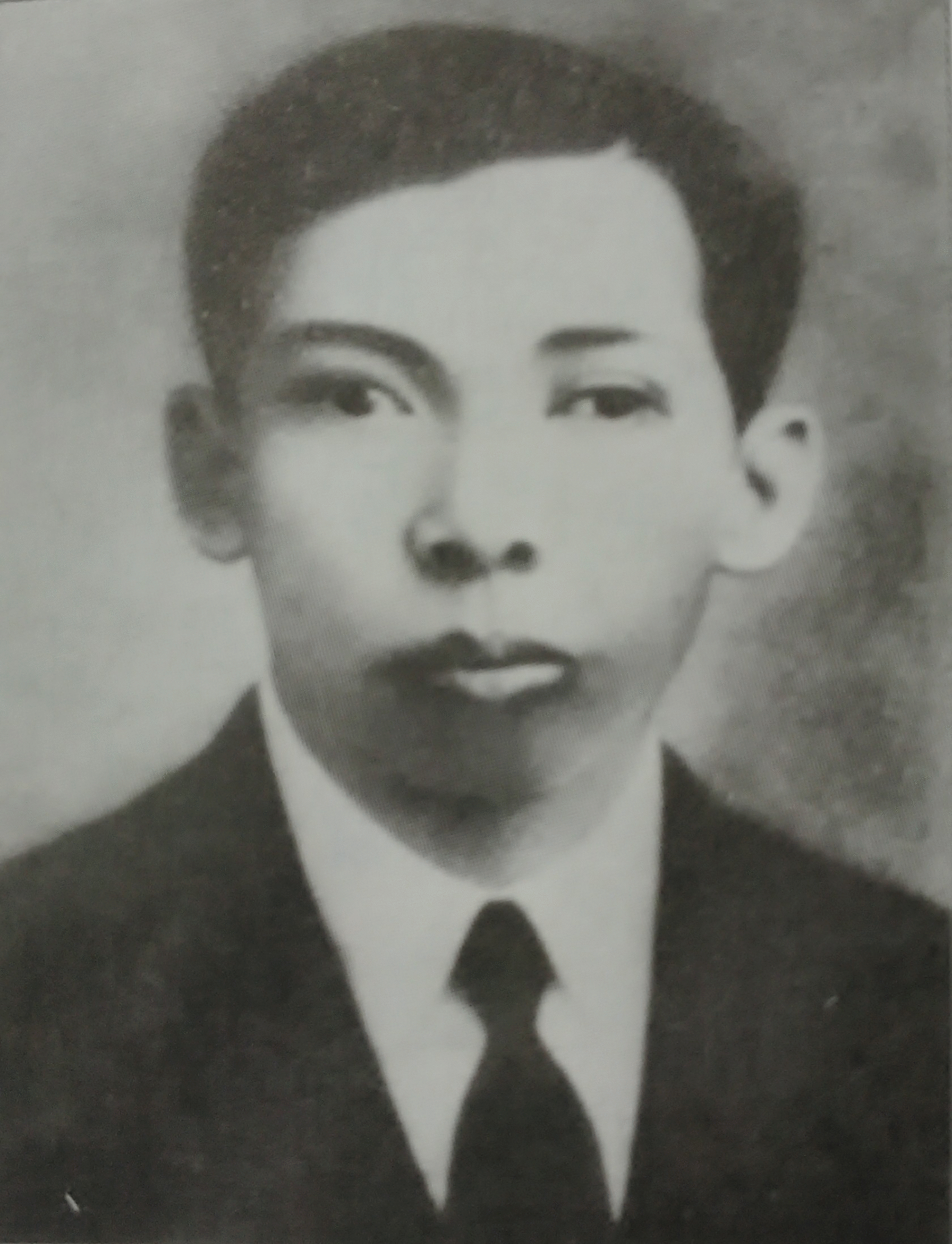
- Tran Phu in 1930

General Secretary of the Central Committee of the Indochinese Communist Party
- In office 27 October 1930 – 19 April 1931
- Preceded by: Position established Trịnh Đình Cửu
- Succeeded by: Lê Hồng Phong

Personal details
- Born: May 1, 1904 Tuy An, Phú Yên, Annam, French Indochina
- Died: September 6, 1931 (aged 27) Saigon, Cochinchina
- Party: Communist Party of Vietnam

Trần Phú (1 May 1904 in Tuy An District – 6 September 1931) was a Vietnamese revolutionary and the first general secretary of the Indochinese Communist Party, later renamed the Communist Party of Vietnam.

== Biography ==
Trần Phú was born on May 1, 1904, at An Thổ, phủ Tuy An, tỉnh Phú Yên (today xã An Dân, Tuy An District, Phú Yên Province) where his father, Tran Van Pho, was a teacher. His father was born at the village of Tùng Sinh, now part of Tùng Ảnh commune, Đức Thọ District, Hà Tĩnh Province. Trần Phú graduated thành chung (general qualification) in 1922 and in 1925 he joined Hội Phục Việt (later renamed Tân Việt Cách mạng Đảng) in Vinh, Nghệ An.

In 1926, he went to Canton (Guangzhou), China, to arrange the merger of his organization with the Vietnam Revolutionary Youth League. In 1927, he went to the USSR and studied at the Communist University of the Toilers of the East in Moscow. In 1928, he attended the sixth session of Communist International. On 11 October 1929, the court of Nam triều in Nghệ An conducted the trial in absentia of some members of the Indochinese Communist Party; Trần Phú was one of those accused.

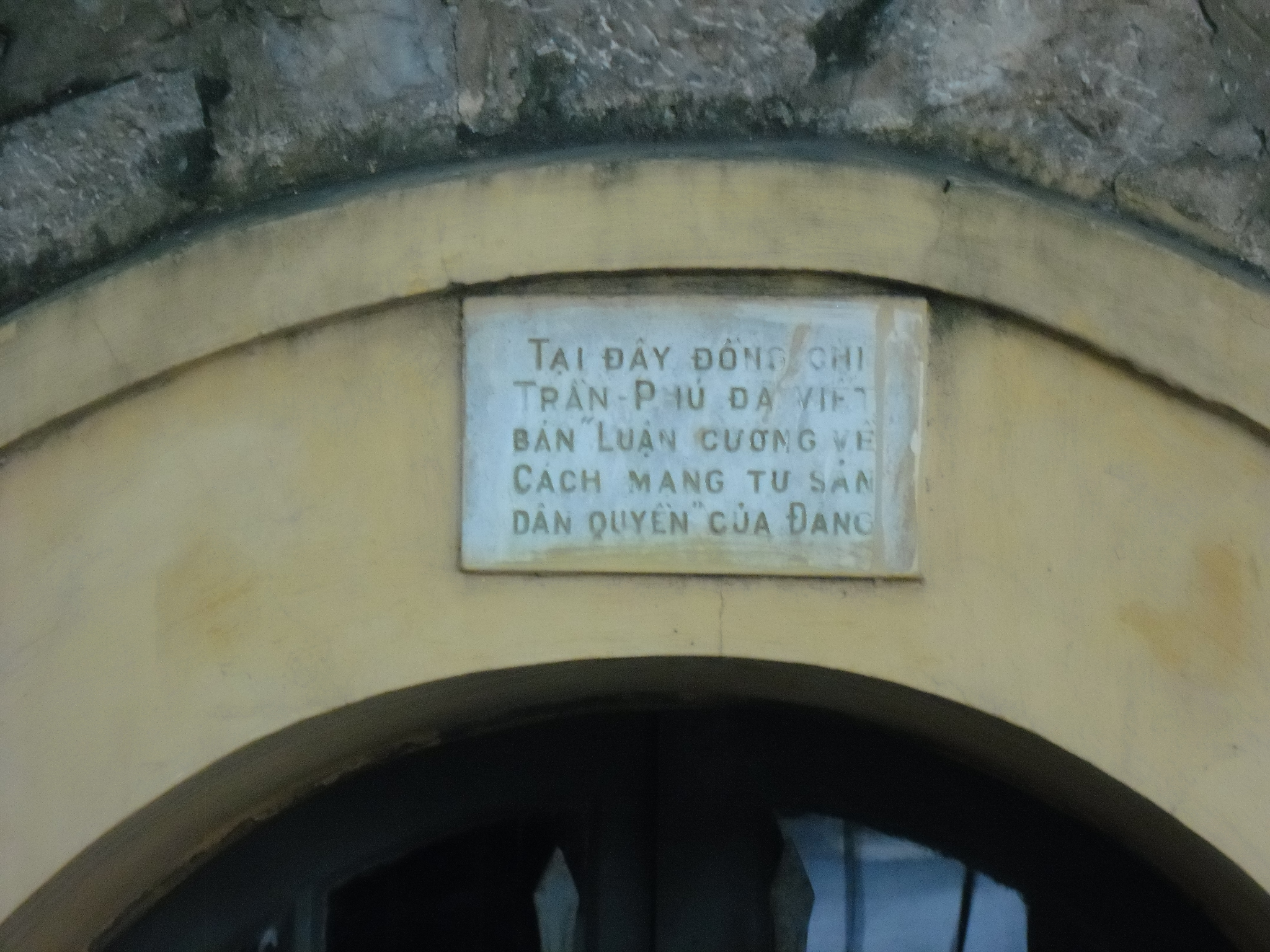
The sign on the basement of the house on 90 Tho Nhuom Street, Hanoi means "Here comrade Trần Phú wrote the ′Theses on the Bourgeois Democratic Revolution′ of the Party"

April 1930, he came back to Vietnam and joined the Central Committee of the Communist Party of Vietnam. He was given the work of editing Theses on the bourgeois revolution of civil rights. On 19 April 1931, he was arrested by the French. He died on 6 September 1931 due to torture by the French.
