= Hội Phục Việt =

During the 1920s openly democratic patriotic movement in the French Indochina, on July 14, 1925, a number of students from Indochina Pedagogical College and a number of former political prisoners in Annam established Hội Phục Việt (Vietnamese Restoration Association). After being exposed after spreading leaflets asking the French authorities to release patriot Phan Bội Châu (November 1925). Hội Phục Việt changed its name several times and eventually changed to Tân Việt Revolutionary Party (July 1928).

Tân Việt Revolutionary Party gathered young intellectuals and patriotic petty bourgeois youth, operating mainly in Annam. Born and operating while the Vietnamese Revolutionary Youth League was thriving, the theories of Marxism–Leninism had a great influence, Tân Việt Revolutionary Party attracted a lot of patriotic young people to participate. During its operation, the party split into two left-wing and right-wing tendencies. In the end, the leftist tendency to embrace communism prevailed. Some members were transferred to study at the Revolutionary Youth League (founded in November 1925, led by Hồ Chí Minh), actively preparing for the establishment of a new party following the path of the Communist Party of Vietnam.
