= Communist League of Indochina =

Political party in Southeast Asia

Communist League of Indochina (Đông Dương Cộng sản Liên đoàn)
- Leader: Trần Phú
- Founded: 1929
- Dissolved: February 10, 1930
- Preceded by: Tân Việt Revolutionary Party, Phuc Quoc
- Merged into: Communist Party of Vietnam
- Headquarters: Trung Ky
- Ideology: Communism

The Communist League of Indochina (Đông Dương Cộng sản Liên đoàn) was one of the three communist groups of 1929–1930 which formed the base of the Communist Party of Vietnam in Vietnam, and within colonial French Indochina. It was formerly the Tân Việt Cách mệnh Đảng (Revolutionary Party of the New Vietnam) as well as the "Restoration Society" between 1925 and 1930.

The cadres who led the change were Hà Huy Tập, Trần Phú, and Trần Phạm Hồ.

The League gained its name following a factional split of the Communist Party of Vietnam in 1929. The League came to prominence following the suppression of anti-colonial activities in the Annam protectorate by the French colonial authorities; these initiatives came from both conservative nationalist groups and communists who had a shared interest in resisting colonial rule by France. Eventually, members of the Indochinese Communist League joined the Communist Party of Vietnam, following directives from the Soviet-controlled Comintern (Communist International) to create a unified Communist Party in French Indochina. Prior to its absorption into the Communist Party of Vietnam, the league maintained its own political organizations, including worker's associations, students associations, and a women's organization.

== Founding ==
=== Influence of French colonial rule ===
French Indochina had been established as a French colony under the authority of the French Third Republic (Troisième République). Three regions, which now form the modern state of Vietnam were incorporated into Indochina: Cochinchina, Annam and Tonkin. French colonialism triggered widespread discontent amongst local populations throughout the early twentieth century, causing various political organizations whose primary purpose was resisting French colonialism to form. Some of these movements identified with communism, however, others were formed along more conservative, bourgeois lines.

=== Evolution into the Indochinese Communist League ===
The Indochinese Communist League was formerly known as the Tân Việt which was established in 1928. Prior to this, it had been known as the "Restoration Society" (Phuc Quoc), which was founded in 1925. The organization gained prominence following a factional split of the Communist Party of Vietnam (commonly known as the Thanh Nien) in 1929. This split was primarily the result of suppression of the Chinese Communist Party (CCP) by the Kuomintang; many Vietnamese communists were involved with the CCP, especially in southern cities such as Guangzhou. In the wake of the split, three communist organizations appeared: the Communist Party of Indochina, the Indochinese Communist League, and the Communist Party of Annam.

The choice of the name "Indochinese Communist League" was the result of the Tân Việt rebranding itself at a conference on January 1, 1930. The apparent intention of this rebranding was to dispel rumours circulating amongst the wider communist movement in Vietnam that the Tân Việt was simply a nationalist militia that lacked commitment to the cause of communism. These concerns about the Tân Việt's commitment to the cause of communism stemmed from the fact that the organization's manifesto made no explicit mention of establishing a communist state as an end-goal. Because of its origins, it did not share the same focus on social revolution as the Communist Party of Vietnam had, instead prioritizing national independence.

Contemporary organizations to the Indochinese Communist League also had focuses which did not align with the program of the party. The Communist Party of Indochina was a Marxist–Leninist party which sought emancipation from French colonial rule but also had the explicit end goal of establishing a socialist state. However, the party was rather disorganized and thus could not mobilize to realize these goals. The Communist Party of Annam called for the overthrow of colonial authorities and the so-called “counter-revolutionary bourgeoisie.”

Although the establishment of a communist state was not the main goal of the Tân Việt, it was seen as prudent to draw a connection between communism and national liberation from colonialism. Thus, the Tân Việt chose to rebrand itself as the "Indochinese Communist League".

The League relied upon the support of workers, students and members of the local intelligentsia in the region of Annam. However, it also found unlikely allies in more conservative, bourgeois organizations which shared its goal of securing national independence from France. As the League grew in prominence it produced offshoot organizations which represented the interests of specific groups. These organizations included a worker's association, a student's association and a women's association.

== Major figures ==
=== Trần Phú ===
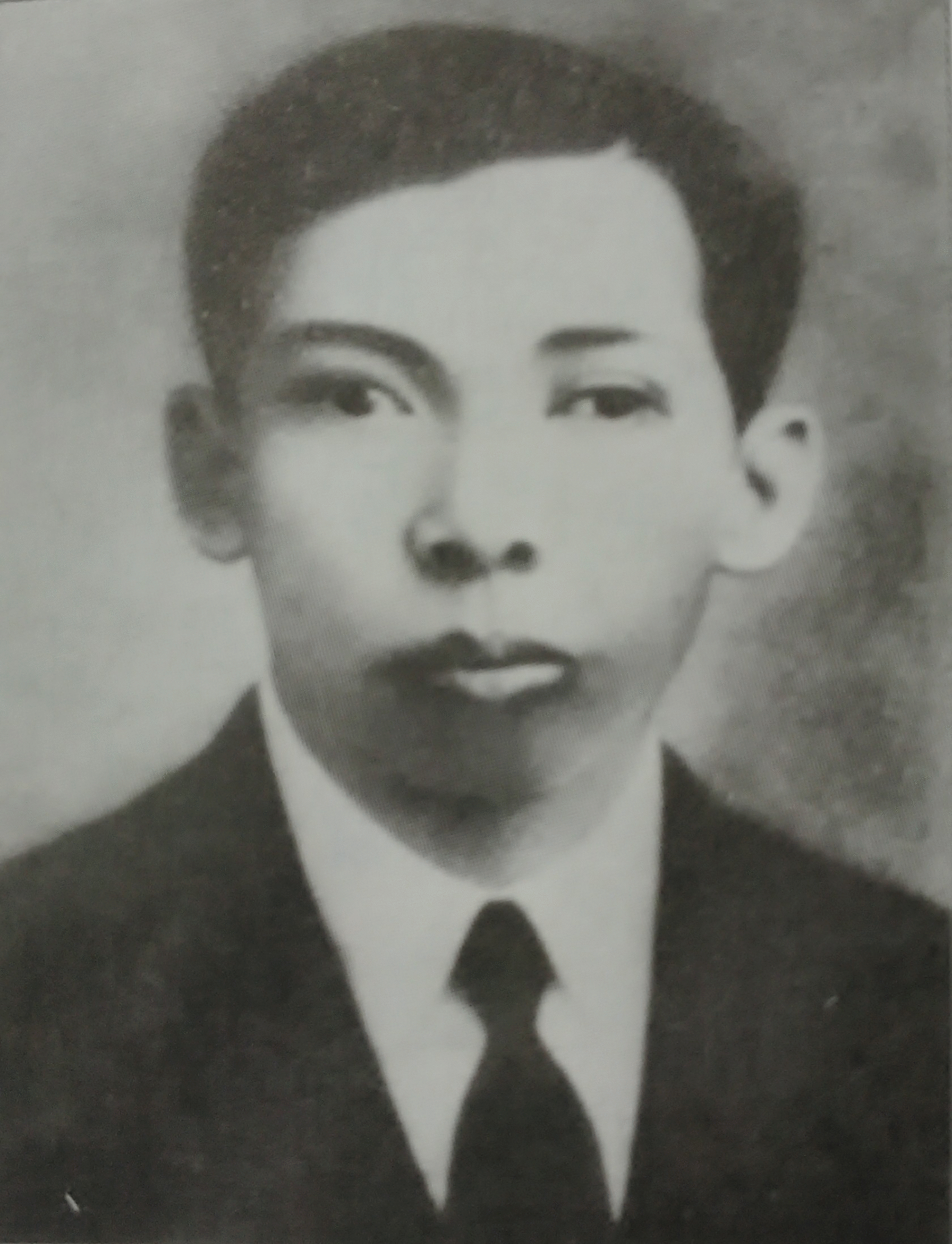
Trần Phú, founder of the Indochinese Communist League, later Secretary-General of the Communist Party of Vietnam (circa. 1930)

Trần Phú was a major figure in multiple communist movements in Vietnam, having been a member of the Indochinese Communist League's predecessor organizations including the Tân Việt and the Restoration Society. A former schoolteacher, Trần was one of the earliest members of the Restoration Society after its founding in 1925, and eventually became the first official leader of the Communist League. Following the merger of the Indochinese Communist League into the Communist Party of Vietnam in 1929, Trần became Secretary-General of the newly united Communist Party. Trần was arrested in 1931 by French authorities and was tortured, eventually dying in custody that same year.

== Ideology ==
While the Indochinese Communist League was a “communist movement” it did not share the same goals as other Communist organizations in French Indochina; namely the primacy of establishing a communist state. The League (formerly the Tân Việt) was anti-imperialist and opposed French colonial rule, however, it did not prioritize the establishment of a Communist state as an end-goal. Ho Chi Minh, who eventually took control of a reunified Vietnamese Communist Party, into which the Indochinese Communist League was absorbed, demonstrated reticence towards the League's commitment to communist ideals. The Tân Việt, and later the Indochinese Communist League, were often described as “communist in spirit” but a militant nationalist group at its core.

The focus of the Indochinese Communist League and its predecessor organizations, the Tân Việt and the Restoration Society, on liberation from colonial rule rather than establishing a communist system caused significant discord within the League itself, and the broader Communist movement in Vietnam. Ho Chi Minh, who during the late 1920s was acting on behalf of the Communist International, promoted the ideal of a "great national unity"; national liberation, according to this philosophy, could only come with the unification of all regardless of class, region or political conviction.

This ideal of "national unity" caused some within the Indochinese Communist League to become disillusioned with the group's apparent lack of political action. Several of the League's members decided to join movements which had the express goal of establishing a communist state, including the prominent Communist Party of Indochina.

== Dissolution ==
By 1931, the Indochinese Communist League ceased to exist as a freestanding political organization, following directives given to Ho Chi Minh from the Comintern form a unified Communist Party of Vietnam. Comintern functionaries, such as Ho Chi Minh, began to see the existence of multiple communist parties, each linked to a certain region of Vietnam, as a manifestation of "regionalism." This alleged "regionalism" was conceived of as an obstacle to establishing a unified communist party in Vietnam; the main goal of the Communist International as it concerned Vietnam.

A directive titled “On the Formation of a Communist Party in Indochina” on the 27th of October, 1929 initiated the proceedings which would see the re-unification of communist movements in French Indochina under one Communist Party at the so-called “Unification Conference”. Held in Hong Kong from February 3–7, 1930, the “Unification Conference” resulted in the creation of the Vietnamese Communist Party (Đảng Cộng sản Việt Nam), which became a part of the Comintern's Vietnamese activities. A few days later, around February 10, 1930, signed statutes by Ho Chi Minh were brought back to Saigon, detailing the creation of the Vietnamese Communist Party which combined, and effectively dissolved the individual parties it merged. Throughout the process of “unification”, Ho Chi Minh maintained a strong leadership role, being responsible for corresponding with the party delegates and having chaired the Conference.

The Unification Conference was dominated by the Indochinese Communist Party and the Annam Communist Party (a separate organization, not to be confused with the Indochinese Communist League). Although members of the Indochinese Communist League were able to join the newly formed Communist Party of Vietnam as members, the League as an organization had no unified voice of its own at the Unification Conference. The Indochinese Communist League was simply absorbed into the Communist Party of Vietnam as a “communist-oriented” revolutionary group rather than as a founding member in its own right.
