= Indochinese Communist Party =

Indochinese Communist Party Đảng Cộng Sản Đông-Dương
- Abbreviation: ICP; ĐCSĐD
- General Secretary: Trần Phú (first); Trường Chinh (last de jure)
- Founder: Hồ Chí Minh
- Founded: October 1930
- Dissolved: 11 November 1945 (de jure) none (de facto reinstated as the Workers’ Party of Vietnam)
- Preceded by: Vietnamese Communist Party
- Succeeded by: Communist Party of Vietnam; Lao People's Revolutionary Party; Kampuchean People's Revolutionary Party (1951–1960)
- Ideology: Communism; Marxism–Leninism; Anti-imperialism
- Political position: Far-left
- International affiliation: Comintern
- National fronts: Viet Minh (Laos) Pathet Lao; Samakhum Khmer
- Colors: Red

Party flag
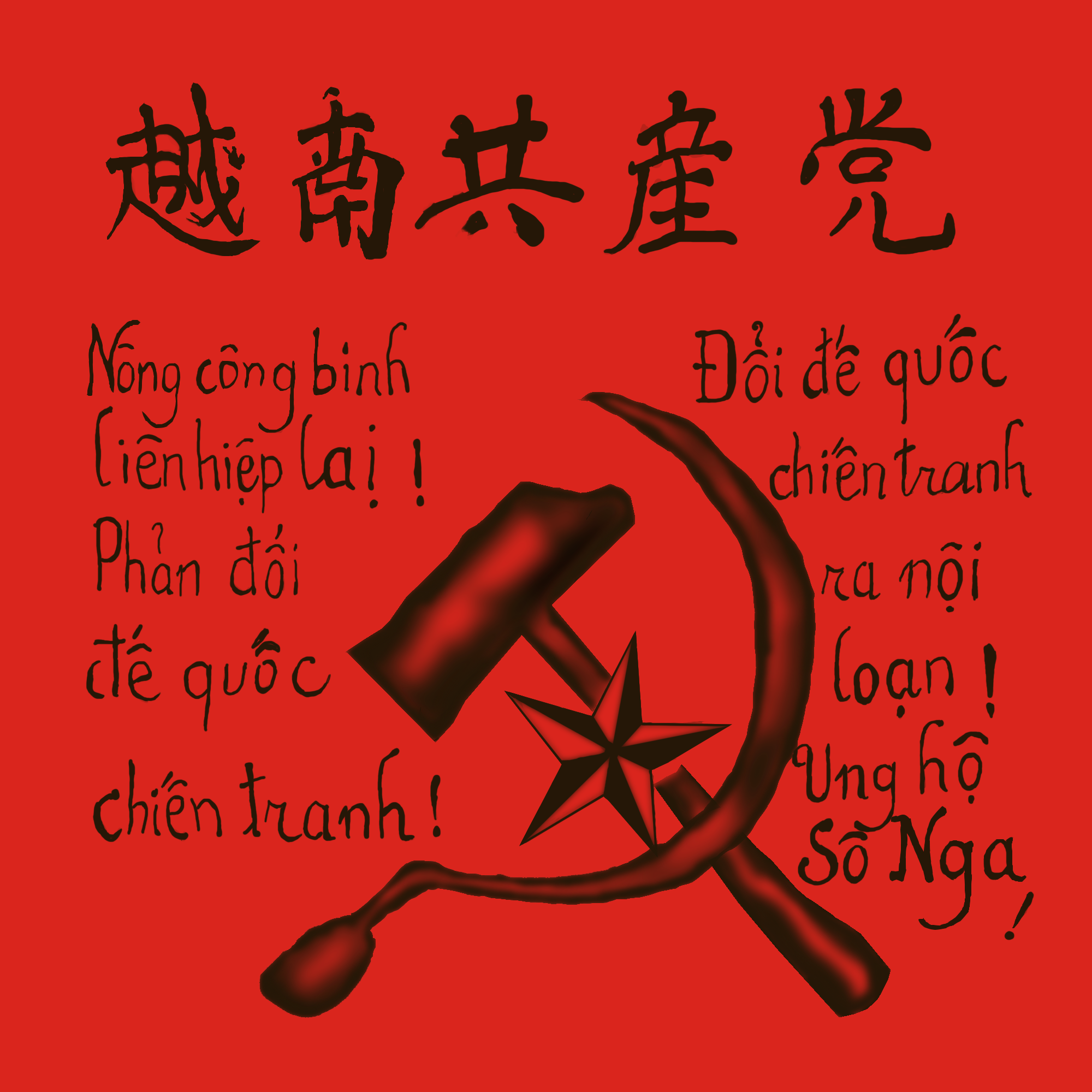

The Indochinese Communist Party (ICP) (Note: French: Parti communiste indochinois, pronounced [paʁti kɔmynist ɛ̃dɔʃinwa]; Vietnamese: Đảng Cộng sản Đông Dương / 黨共產東洋, pronounced [ʔɗaːŋ˧˩ kəwŋ͡m˧˨ʔ saːn˧˩ ʔɗəwŋ͡m˧˧ zɨən˧˧]; Khmer: បក្សកុម្មុយនីស្តឥណ្ឌូចិន [paʔ kom.muj.nih ʔən.ɗuː.cən]; Lao: ອິນດູຈີນພັກກອມມູນິດ; Chinese: 印度支那共產黨) was a political party which was renamed from the Vietnamese Communist Party in October 1930. It was renamed in line with Comintern directives to reflect its regional mission.

On 11 November 1945, the Indochinese Communist Party was nominally dissolved, continuing its activities under the name Institute for Studying Marxism in Indochina while operating clandestinely. It was publicly reestablished as the Workers’ Party of Vietnam in February 1951. After the Vietnam War, it adopted the name Communist Party of Vietnam.

== Background ==
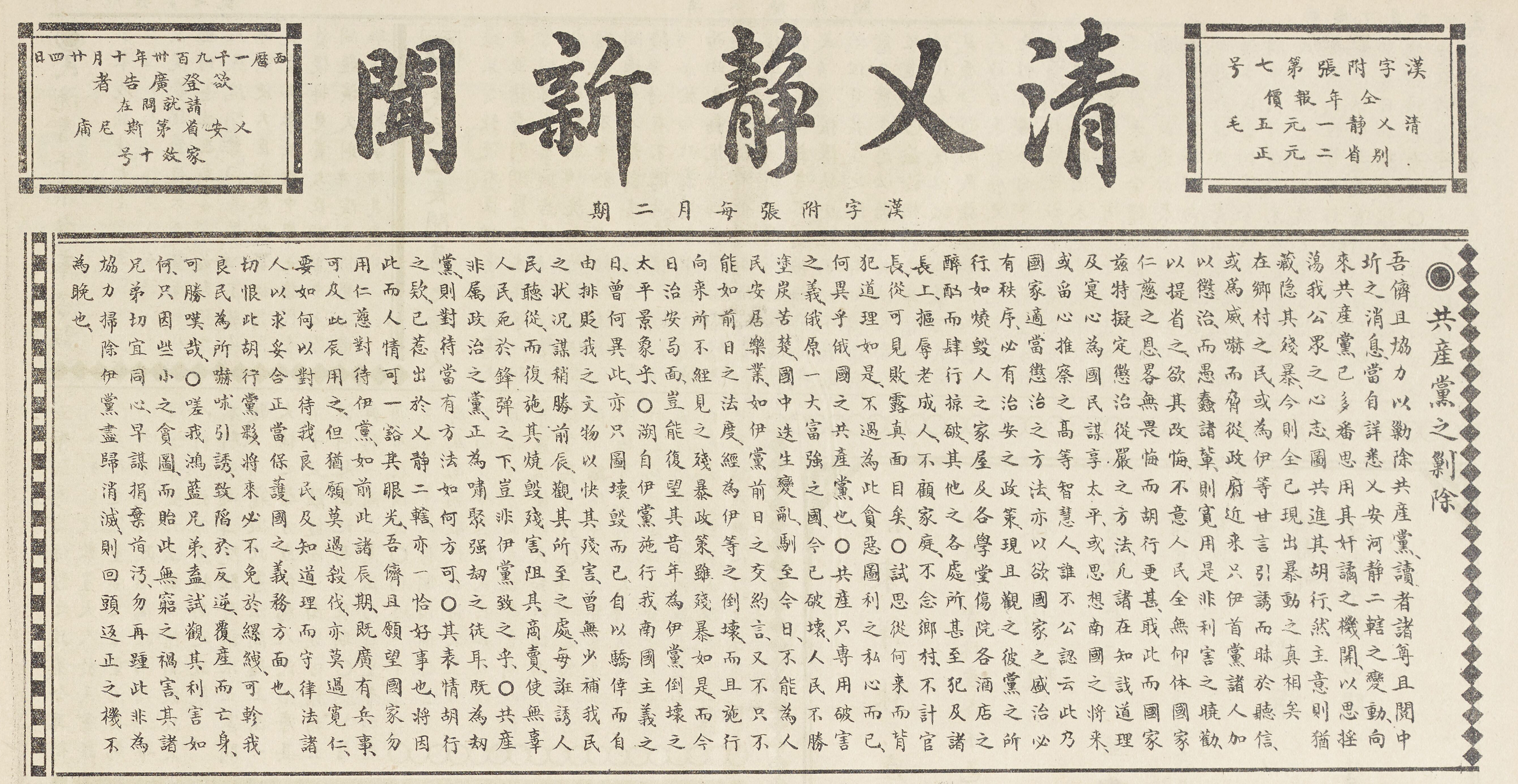
A 1930 newspaper article in the Thanh Nghệ Tịnh tân văn (清乂靜新聞) entitled Cộng sản Đảng chi tiễu trừ (共產黨之剿除, "Eradication of the Communist Party").

The Vietnamese Communist Party (Vietnamese: Đảng Cộng-sản Việt-Nam) was founded on 3 February 1930 by uniting the Communist Party of Indochina (despite its name, this party was active only in Tonkin) and the Communist Party of Annam (active only in Cochinchina). Thereafter, the Communist League of Indochina (active only in central Annam) joined the Vietnamese Communist Party. However, the Comintern argued that the communist movement should be promoted in the whole of French Indochina (including Cambodia, Laos and Vietnam) rather than only in Vietnam, therefore it urged the Vietnamese Communist Party to transform itself into the Indochinese Communist Party. The Communist International had a substantial degree of control both over the party's policies and over the composition of its leadership in return of financial aid.

The League for National Salvation of Vietnamese Residents of Kampuchea was a pro-Viet Minh movement of Vietnamese inhabitants in Cambodia.

The organization emerged from a network of revolutionary committees formed among Vietnamese residents in the border areas of Cambodia towards the end of 1946. Such groups had emerged in places like Takéo Province, Prey Veng Province and southern Kandal Province. The League for National Salvation of Vietnamese Residents of Kampuchea was set up as a front organization of the Indochinese Communist Party in March 1947, merging the various local revolutionary committees. One of the first Viet Minh documents captured by the French in Cambodia was dated 30 April 1949 and revealed the existence of the League, as well as detailing a proposed Vietnamese-Khmer alliance against the French.

In 1950, Vietnamese sources claimed the organization had a membership of 50,000.

The ICP was closely tied to and directed the Viet Minh, a Vietnamese coalition resistance front. The organization sought to coordinate revolutionary activity across the entire Indochinese region. In Cambodia, this manifested in the creation of the League for National Salvation of Vietnamese Residents of Kampuchea, which was later transformed into a pro-Viet Minh movement among the Vietnamese diaspora in Cambodia.

The party's influence stretched as far as Laos, where local communist forces formed their own alliances with the ICP. While the Vietnamese leadership, spearheaded by figures like Hồ Chí Minh, maintained the dominant role within the ICP, the organization's members in Cambodia and Laos played crucial roles in shaping the local revolutionary movements, leading to the eventual creation of the Cambodian People's Party (CPP) and Lao People's Party.

== Ideology ==
The ICP was deeply influenced by the ideology of Marxism-Leninism, which formed the ideological foundation for communist movements across the world in the early 20th century. Marxism-Leninism emphasized the importance of class struggle, the overthrow of capitalist systems, and the creation of a socialist state led by the working class. The ICP, however, adapted these principles to the specific historical and cultural context of Indochina, which was under French colonial rule. The party's major ideological tenets included:

- Anti-Imperialism: The central aim of the ICP was to overthrow French colonial rule. The party viewed French imperialism as the primary force suppressing the people of Indochina and sought to establish national independence through revolution.
- Class Struggle: The ICP adopted a Marxist-Leninist view of class struggle, positioning the proletariat (working class) and peasantry as the primary agents of revolution against the bourgeoisie (capitalist class) and feudal elites in Indochina. The party envisioned a government based on the alliance of workers, peasants, and soldiers.
- Peasant and Worker Empowerment: Unlike some other communist movements which focused heavily on the industrial proletariat, the ICP also emphasized the importance of the peasantry in the revolution. Much of Indochina's population was rural, and the ICP sought to mobilize this largely agrarian population to fight against colonialism and feudal oppression.
- Socialist Revolution: The party aimed to replace the colonial capitalist system with a socialist economy that would be based on collective ownership of the means of production, including land, factories, and banks. The ICP advocated for the redistribution of land from imperialists and local elites to the poor peasantry.
- National Unity: A key element in the ICP's ideological framework was the belief in the unity of Vietnam, Cambodia, and Laos. The party stressed the importance of a united Indochina in the fight for independence, which transcended linguistic, ethnic, and cultural divisions.

== Transformation ==
In 1930, as part of its transformation from the Vietnamese Communist Party to the Indochinese Communist Party, the ICP adopted a more inclusive approach that acknowledged the interconnected struggles of the entire Indochinese region. This shift was largely a response to the Comintern's directives, which pushed for an internationalist vision of anti-imperialist struggle.

By the mid-1940s, the political dynamics of Indochina were changing rapidly. World War II had severely weakened the French colonial system, and the Japanese occupation of Indochina from 1940 to 1945 had further destabilized the region. The Viet Minh emerged as the most powerful anti-colonial force in Vietnam, and its dominance was solidified after Japan's defeat in 1945. The ICP formally dissolved itself in November 1945 for strategic political reasons, but continued operating clandestinely.

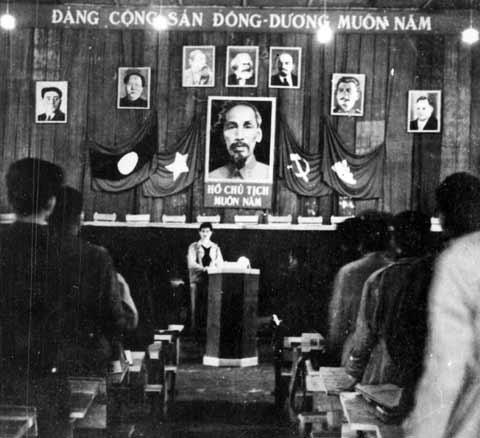
Second Congress of the ICP, Tuyên Quang, 1951

The ICP reemerged publicly as the Workers' Party of Vietnam in 1951, which later became the Communist Party of Vietnam in 1976. In Cambodia, the Kampuchean People's Revolutionary Party was founded (which eventually evolved into the Cambodian People's Party). Similarly, in Laos, the communist movement solidified into the Lao People's Revolutionary Party, which played a significant role in the country’s post-independence political developments.

== Party activity program ==
The party program of action was based on 10 points:

1. To overthrow French imperialism, Vietnamese feudalism and reactionary bourgeoisie;
2. To make Indochina completely independent;
3. To establish a worker-peasant-soldier government;
4. To confiscate banks and other enterprises belonging to the imperialists and put them under the control of the worker-peasant-soldier government;
5. To confiscate all the plantations and property belonging to the imperialists and the reactionary bourgeoisie and distribute them to the poor;
6. To implement eight-hour working days;
7. To abolish the forced buying of government bonds, the poll tax and all unjust taxes that the poor has to pay;
8. To bring democratic freedoms to the masses;
9. To dispense education to all the people; and
10. To realize equality between men and women.

== Legacy ==
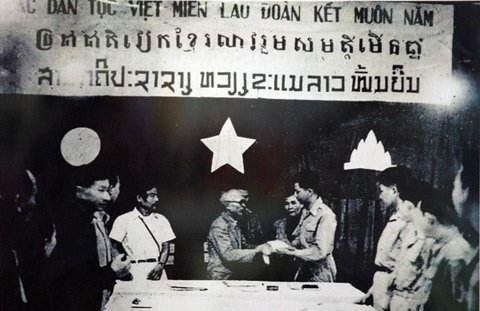
Congress of the People's Alliance of Vietnam, Cambodia, and Laos, convened under the auspices of the Workers' Party of Vietnam in 1951.

The dissolution of the ICP marked the end of its direct influence, but its legacy endured. The ICP’s role in unifying communist resistance movements across Indochina laid the foundations for the Vietnam War, the Khmer Rouge revolution, and the Laotian Civil War, each of which would lead to significant political and social upheaval in Southeast Asia.

- Vietnam: The communist-led Viet Minh, led by Hồ Chí Minh, would go on to take over North Vietnam in 1954, following the defeat of French forces at the Battle of Dien Bien Phu. The Vietnam War (1955–1975) would later ensue, marking a bloody chapter in the Cold War.
- Cambodia: The Cambodian People's Party, founded by former members of the ICP, would become the dominant communist party in Cambodia. However, it was eventually replaced by the Khmer Rouge under Pol Pot, which carried out one of the most horrific genocides in history during the Cambodian Civil War (1970–1975).
- Laos: The Lao People's Revolutionary Party, with the Pathet Lao movement, would eventually succeed in taking power in 1975, establishing the Lao People's Democratic Republic.

== See also ==
- History of the Communist Party of Vietnam
- Communism in Vietnam
