= Phạm Phương Thảo =

Vietnamese singer

- Phạm Phương Thảo illustrated on the cover of her 2018 poetry book "Đi hết xuân thì"
- Born: Phạm Thị Thảo; January 18, 1982 (age 44); Nghi Lộc District, Nghệ An Province, North Vietnam
- Education: Vietnamese Army College of Culture and Arts
- Title: Merited Artist of Vietnam (2015) NSND (People's Artist of Vietnam, 2023)
- Spouse: Trần Sỹ Thịnh (married 2007–2009)
Career Information
- Genres: Folk music
- Occupations: Singer, Songwriter, Composer
- Years active: 1999–present
- Label: Thang Long AV
- Awards: – Third Prize (3rd Place) in the folk division of Sao Mai 2003 and "Audience Favorite" award – Honorary title "Nghệ sĩ Ưu tú" (NSƯT, 2016) – Honorary title "Nghệ sĩ Nhân dân" (NSND, 2023)

Phạm Phương Thảo (born Phạm Thị Thảo on January 18, 1982) is a Vietnamese singer, songwriter, and composer known for her contributions to Vietnamese folk and lyrical music. Her career began with singing competitions and national contests, where she won multiple awards including Audience Favorite and 3rd Place. Trained at the Vietnamese Army of Culture and Arts, Thảo is a member of the Vietnam National Music and Dance Theater and has released numerous albums. Over the years, she has received several reputable honors, served as a judge for a singing competition and participated in charity events across Vietnam.

== Early life and education ==
Phạm Phương Thảo was born Phạm Thị Thảo in 1982 in the Nghi Lộc district of Nghệ An province in Vietnam. Born to a poor family in a rural area, Phạm was the fourth of five siblings. Phạm had developed a passion for music from a young age, constantly singing while doing chores such as washing dishes.

Phạm later pursued formal music training by enrolling in the Vietnamese Army College of Culture and Arts, known as Trường Cao đẳng Văn hóa Nghệ thuật Quân đội in Vietnamese. She graduated from this institution in 2002.

== Career ==
=== 1999–2002: Early career ===
Phạm's career began in 1999 after she began partaking in singing competitions, winning Third Prize in the Giọng hát hay Hà Nội (Hanoi Singing Contest) that same year. Over the next few years (2000–2002), she collected multiple gold medals at national professional music festivals. In 2003, Phạm entered the "Sao Mai" (Morning Star) national television singing competition in the folk category, eventually placing third while also winning the "Audience Favorite" award. In addition to this, she also won three gold medals consecutively between the years of 2001–2003 at the National Professional Youth & Students Music Festival. These combined successes soon quickly launched her into public attention.

=== 2003–2009: First studio albums released ===
In 2003, she joined the Vietnam Music and Dance Theater as a performing singer, recording albums soon after. Her debut studio album Một khúc tâm tình (Vol. 1) was released in 2004, and was soon followed by her sophomore album Cho mẹ, cho em và cho tôi (Vol. 2) in 2005. Phạm planned to release her third studio album Lời ru đất nước (Vol. 3) in 2007, though she had to postpone it until May 2008 due to her wedding. As such, this album—along with the 4th album Mẹ (Vol. 4)—were both released in 2008. In 2009, Phạm released her 5th album, titled Mơ quê (Vol. 5), which contained two music videos made with her then husband Trần Sỹ Thịnh, "Bài ca thống nhất" and "Người đi xây hồ Kẻ Gỗ".

=== 2010–2018: Songwriting, composing, and poetry ===
In 2010, she composed the song "Gái Nghệ" which is regarded as her first work as a composer. In 2011, Phạm released the album titled "Điệu buồn điệu thương" as a tribute to the singer An Thuyên, her teacher whom she felt indebted to.Phạm is also known to be a prolific songwriter, writing most of her own songs, as well as ones for other artists, all in a traditional style. After her first composition "Gái Nghệ" in 2010, she continued composing songs, with notable ones being "Chàng vinh quy", "Mơ duyên", "Chút tình em gửi", "Mười đóa sen thơm", "Đất mẹ ngày về", "Gái Nghệ", "Mong manh em", and "Cõng mẹ về trời", among others. A 2018 concert and album cycle (her 20th anniversary "Mơ duyên" tour) featured a third of the program consisting of her own compositions. That same year, she released a self-written folk-style music video "Chàng vinh quy", as well as a poetry collection titled "Đi hết xuân thì".

=== 2019–Present: Hosting "Con đường âm nhạc" and judging on Sao Mai ===
In addition to music and recordings, Phạm has also appeared on television. Vietnam Television produced a special program about her music titled "Con đường âm nhạc" (The Music Path). She has also performed at concerts and charity galas nationwide. Over the years, she has also become a leading figure in Vietnam's folk-music scene, mentoring younger artists informally—notably being a judge in the folk category for the Sao Mai category in 2019 and in 2022. In 2024, she was invited to sit on the Artistic Counsel of the National Music and Dance Festival for the second time.

== Musical style ==
Phạm's work is deeply rooted in Vietnamese folk and lyrical traditions, and critics note that she is "nổi tiếng với những ca khúc mang đậm chất dân gian xứ Nghệ" ("famous for songs imbued with Nghệ An folk style"). These critics have also described her voice as "sweet and deep". A VTV profile similarly remarks that her "giọng hát ngọt ngào, tình cảm" (sweet, emotive voice) and attractive stage presence have impressed audiences. Her performances often incorporate patriotic Vietnamese themes, such as in "Ai vô xứ Nghệ", as well as in other odes to her homeland. As a person and a lyricist however, she is sometimes characterized by contrasting images. As journalist Huy Hoàng notes, "Nếu hát và sáng tác 'sắc như dao', thì cô gái quê Nghệ An cũng thật 'mềm như lụa' trong chuyện yêu" ("if her singing and songwriting are 'sharp as a knife', the Nghệ An country girl is also 'soft as silk' in love").

== Public image and philanthropy ==
Phạm is widely viewed as a "cultural ambassador" for Vietnamese folk music. In interviews she speaks openly about her dedication to music and family, as can be seen in a 2019 interview in which she recalled that her happiest moment was stepping onto the stage to accept the Audience Favorite Award at Sao Mai 2003—a memory "incredibly happy and sacred" in her career. She has also emphasized her devotion to her relatives, as she states in this interview, "Cho tới giờ khi đã thành danh, có cuộc sống ổn định, có thể tự lo liệu cho mình và đỡ đần người thân trong gia đình…" ("Until now, having become successful, with a stable life, I can take care of myself and also help my relatives in the family…"). Phạm is also known for charitable involvement. She "actively participates in community activities, giving gifts to poor families and performing in charity fundraising events."

== Awards and honors ==
Over the course of her career, Phạm has received many honors. Early on, she had won numerous contest awards, (e.g. multiple gold medals in national art festivals, the 1999 Hanoi contest prize, and the 2003 Sao Mai Third Prize), however more recently in 2016, the Vietnamese government had conferred upon her the title of "Nghệ sĩ Ưu tú" ("Meritorious Artist") at the age of 34, making her one of Vietnam's youngest-ever NSƯT recipients. In 2023, she was elevated to the title of "Nghệ sĩ Nhân dân" ("People's Artist")—one of Vietnam's highest cultural distinctions—at the age of 41, becoming the youngest in that year's award list.

== Personal life ==
In 2007, she married a businessman whom she met in 2004 named Trần Sỹ Thịnh. They divorced in 2009. Media reports also indicate that she has had two failed marriages prior to this one as well.

== Discography ==
Studio Albums
Year	Title
2004	Một khúc tâm tình
2005	Cho mẹ, cho em & cho tôi
2008	Lời ru đất nước
2008	Mẹ
2009	Mơ quê
2010	Đẹp nhất tên người
2011	Điệu buồn, điệu thương
2011	Tơ vương
2012	Cho em thôi chòng chành
2012	Gái Nghệ
2013	Tình trong câu hát
2015	Chút tình em gửi
2017	Tri ân

== Other works ==
=== Poetry ===
2018 – Đi hết xuân thì Poetry Collection

=== Movie(s) ===
2021 – "Điều không thể mất"

=== Music videos ===
2014 – Hết đứng lại ngồi

2017 – Dọc ngang đò tình

2019 – Có thương nhau thì về

=== Solo live shows ===
2019 – Mơ Duyên

=== Compositions ===
- Đất mẹ ngày về
- Cho em thôi chòng chành
- Trăng sáng một mình
- Chàng vinh quy
- Mong manh em
- Mơ duyên
- Gái Nghệ
