= Nghi Lộc =

Coordinates: 18°46′20″N 105°37′57″E

- Commune
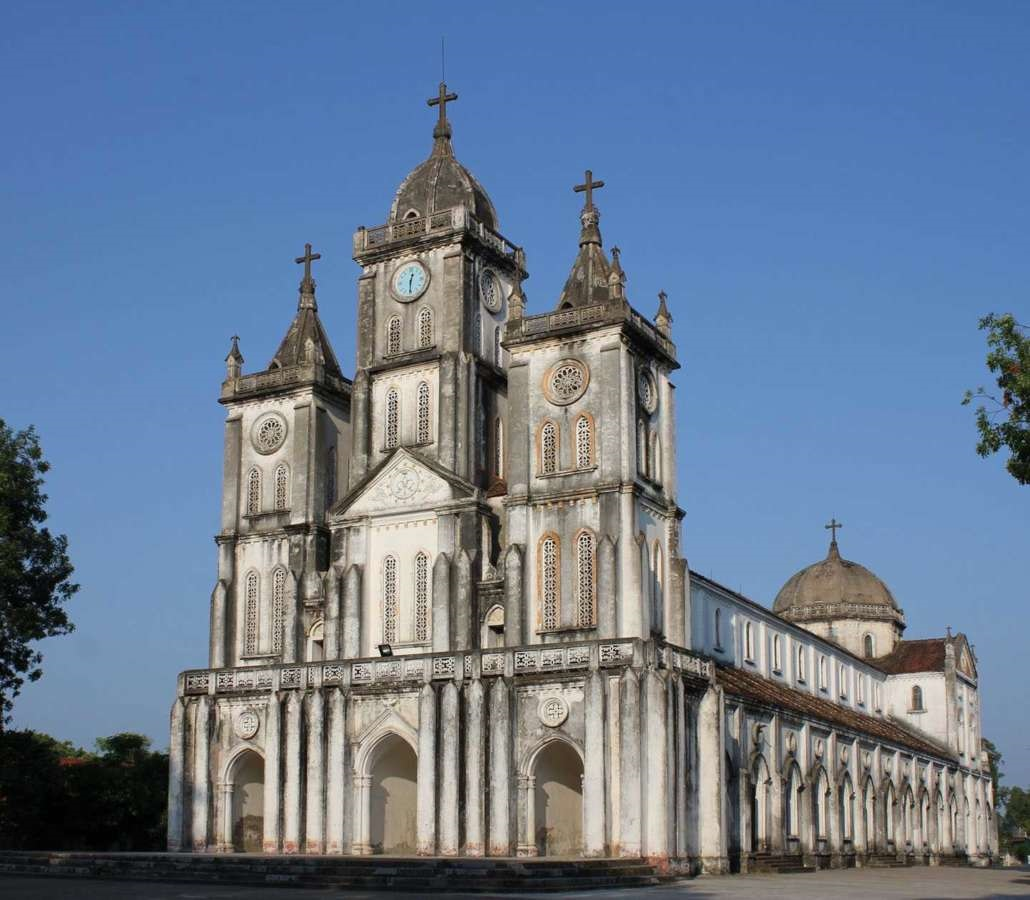
- Xã Đoài Cathedral
- Country: Vietnam
- Region: North Central Coast
- Province: Nghệ An
- Established: 16 June 2025

Area
  - Total: 33.31 km^{2} (12.86 sq mi)

Population (2025)
  - Total: 46,022
  - Density: 1,382/km^{2} (3,580/sq mi)

Nghi Lộc is a commune in Nghệ An province, Vietnam.

Nghi Lộc commune was established under Resolution No. 1678/NQ-UBTVQH15, issued by the Standing Committee of the National Assembly of Vietnam on 16 June 2025. Under the resolution, the entire area and population of Quán Hành township and Diên Hoa, Nghi Trung, and Nghi Vạn communes, formerly part of Nghi Lộc district, were merged to form a new commune named Nghi Lộc.
