= Vietnamese Revolutionary Youth League =

Marxist organization

Vietnamese Revolutionary Youth League Việt Nam Thanh niên Cách mạng Đồng chí Hội
- Abbreviation: Thanh niên VARY
- Leader: Nguyễn Ái Quốc; Hồ Tùng Mậu; Lê Hồng Sơn; Lê Hồng Phong; Vương Thúc Oánh; Trương Vân Lĩnh; Lưu Quốc Long; Lâm Đức Thụ
- Founder: Nguyễn Ái Quốc
- Founded: June 21, 1925
- Dissolved: 4 August 1929
- Preceded by: Tam Tam Association
- Succeeded by: Communist Party of Indochina; Communist Party of Annam
- Headquarters: Guangzhou
- Newspaper: Thanh Niên
- Membership (1929): c. 1500
- Ideology: Communism; Anti-colonialism; Anti-revisionism; Marxism-leninism; Vietnamese nationalism
- Political position: Far-left
- National affiliation: Chinese Communist Party
- International affiliation: Communist International

The Vietnamese Revolutionary Youth League (Vietnamese: Việt Nam Thanh niên Cách mệnh Đồng chí Hội; chữ Hán: 越南青年革命同志會), commonly known as Thanh niên, was founded by Nguyen Ai Quoc (later known as Ho Chi Minh) in Guangzhou in the spring of 1925. It is regarded as the "first truly Marxist organization in Indochina" and "the beginning of Vietnamese communism".

With the support of the Chinese Communist Party and the left wing of the Kuomintang, the League educated and trained a significant number of Marxist–Leninist revolutionaries between 1925 and 1927, many of whom later became leading figures of the Communist Party of Vietnam and the broader Vietnamese Revolution. At the time of its formation, Vietnam was part of colonial French Indochina.

== The history of the Vietnamese Revolutionary Youth League ==
=== Foundation ===
In December 1924, following the Fifth Congress of the Communist International in Moscow, Nguyen Ai Quoc travelled to Guangzhou as an interpreter for Mikhail Borodin (Mikhail Gruzenberg). Using the Chinese pseudonym "Ly Thuy", he was tasked with promoting communist movements in Indochina and the wider Southeast Asian region.

Soon after his arrival, Nguyen Ai Quoc contacted Vietnamese exile groups in several southern Chinese cities between late 1924 and early 1925. In 1925, he and nine trusted members of Tam Tam Xa (the Society of Like Hearts; Chinese: 心心社) formed a secret organization, the Communist Youth Corps (Thanh niên Cộng sản Đoàn). The remaining members of Tam Tam Xa were expected to join a broader, public, and mass-oriented organization—the Vietnamese Revolutionary Youth League—with the Communist Youth Corps serving as its nucleus.

On 21 June 1925, Thanh niên was formally established by Nguyen Ai Quoc and several former leading members of Tam Tam Xa. The League's headquarters were located in a rented three-storey house at 13 Wen Ming Street in downtown Guangzhou. From 1925 to 1927, this headquarters functioned as the Central Committee and as the main coordinating centre for underground revolutionary activities in Vietnam.

During the same period, the League organized three sessions of a "Special Political Training Class", which provided instruction in revolutionary theory and practice, along with courses in history and language. Lectures were delivered by Nguyen Ai Quoc, Ho Tung Mau, and Le Hong Son, while additional guest lecturers included members of the Chinese Communist Party (CCP), left-wing Kuomintang (KMT) activists, and Comintern officials. Each session lasted approximately three to four months. After completing the course, most recruits returned to Vietnam to expand membership and organize underground anticolonial activities. Some recruits joined CCP-affiliated revolutionary movements in China. Several prominent members, including Le Hong Phong, Le Quang Dat, and Tran Phu, were sent for further training at the Whampoa Military Academy or the University for the Toilers of the East in the Soviet Union.

To disseminate revolutionary ideas and attract young supporters, the League published various pamphlets and periodicals in Vietnamese. The Road to Revolution (Đường Kách Mệnh), a training manual compiled from Nguyen Ai Quoc’s lectures, was published by the League of Oppressed Peoples' propaganda section in 1927. Four periodicals were issued regularly during the League's existence: 208 issues of the weekly Thanh Nien (Youth) from June 1925 to May 1930; the weekly Bao Cong Nong (Worker-Peasant) from December 1926 to early 1928; the biweekly Linh Kach Menh (Revolutionary Soldier) from early 1927 to early 1928; and four issues of the monthly Viet Nam Tien Phong (Vanguard of Vietnam) in 1927.

=== Growth of Thanh Nien ===
The League expanded slowly during 1925 and gained momentum only after a series of student strikes. Recruitment initially took place at ports and along the Chinese border. Some early members were children adopted by former Tam Tam Xa members—such as Ly Phong Duc, Ly Tri Thong, and Ly Ung Tuan—who had been brought to Guangzhou from Siam in 1920 by Le Hong Son and Ho Tung Mau. New recruits were taken to the tomb of Phạm Hồng Thái to pledge loyalty to the League, although the organization discouraged his reliance on terrorist tactics.

In September 1926, Nguyen Luong Bang, one of the earliest Thanh Niên recruits, volunteered to return to Vietnam to enlist new members. Following Nguyen Ai Quoc's guidance, he sought out friends and relatives in his home village and in urban areas, directing them to mutual-aid and fraternal associations. He raised issues of colonial oppression and the importance of unity when speaking with potential recruits. Those who showed commitment were expected to attract additional supporters.

Young Vietnamese who escaped arrest often travelled to Guangzhou via Hong Kong in groups of ten to twenty. Many were students expelled for participating in strikes or were otherwise affected by the growing political unrest. The Lycée Albert Sarraut in Hanoi and the Franco-Annamite School of Nam Định were particularly significant recruiting centers, supplying many of the League’s new members.

Recruitment reached its peak in 1927, as discontent intensified following the death of Phan Châu Trinh and the arrest of Nguyễn An Ninh in March 1926. Many students from Cochinchina joined the League and later met with their counterparts from Tonkin and Annam in Guangzhou. By March 1927, the fourth wave of trainees had gathered in Guangzhou, but Chiang Kai-shek's 12 April coup and subsequent persecution of communists brought their training to an abrupt end. Nguyen Ai Quoc left for Moscow in June 1927, while leading figures such as Ho Tung Mau and Le Hong Son were arrested.

To avoid repression by the KMT, the headquarters of the Revolutionary Youth League were relocated first to Wuhan and later to Hong Kong (Kowloon). Despite the political turmoil in Guangzhou following the collapse of the KMT–CCP United Front, the League continued some of its activities and military training in the city until the end of 1928.

=== Split and dissolution ===
Thanh Niên's propaganda and recruitment efforts were highly successful within Vietnam. By mid-1928, three regional committees (kỳ bộ) had been established in Tonkin, Annam, and Cochinchina. In February 1928, the Central Committee appointed Vuong Thuc Oanh, Nguyen Thieu, and Nguyen Si Sach to lead the Annam Regional Committee. Four months later, Le Van Phat was appointed head of the Cochinchina Regional Committee, with Nguyen Kim Cuong and Chau Van Liem as members. The Tonkin Regional Committee was formed in July 1928, comprising Duong Hac Dinh and Trinh Dinh Cuu. However, this rapid domestic expansion occurred without strong direction from the Central Committee in Guangzhou, which had been weakened by consecutive waves of KMT anti-communist repression in China. The resulting loss of contact with a unified headquarters marked the beginning of factional divisions within the League.

At the end of September 1928, the Tonkin Regional Committee (Bắc Kỳ) reportedly held a "Reorganization Conference" near Hanoi to discuss strategies for 'proletarianizing' the organization. Recognizing that most members were students and teachers, the committee sought to expand recruitment among workers. Two cadres, Ngo Gia Tu and Nguyen Duc Canh, were assigned to strengthen propaganda among miners and factory workers, and to 'proletarianize' petty bourgeois students and teachers by sending them to rural areas and urban factories. Members unable to meet the new requirements were labelled "spoiled" or "lacking in virtue" and dismissed from the League. These actions suggest that the Tonkin committee had lost confidence in the Central Committee. After the Guangzhou headquarters relocated in 1928, the radical northern faction increasingly took direction from the Comintern through the Communist Party of France.

In early May 1929, the League convened a plenum in Hong Kong to vote on a new organizational structure and programme of action intended to align with Comintern requirements for a national communist party. The congress, attended by 17 delegates representing the three main regions of Vietnam as well as Hong Kong and Siam, revealed a clear divide between the Central Committee and more radical domestic members. Delegates from Tonkin and Annam argued that the Youth League should be transformed immediately into a full-fledged communist party, rejecting the concept of a unitary revolution in favour of class struggle. Three delegates—Trần Văn Cung, Nguyễn Tuân, and Ngo Gia Tu—left the congress early and later resigned after Lam Duc Thu and Le Hong Son opposed their demand for immediate party formation, arguing that the time was not yet ripe. Radical dissidents accused the Central Committee of being a "bourgeois group" and "false revolutionaries".

On 17 June 1929, more than 20 delegates from Tonkin held a conference in Hanoi, where they declared the dissolution of the Revolutionary Youth League and the formation of a new organization, the Communist Party of Indochina (not to be confused with the later Indochinese Communist Party founded in 1930, which became the Vietnamese Communist Party). Within months, the new Party absorbed most former Thanh Niên members from the Tonkin Regional Committee and began establishing branches in Annam and Cochinchina. It also led a wave of workers' strikes across Vietnam, including in Hanoi, Haiphong, Vinh, Da Nang, and Saigon.

The rise of the Communist Party of Indochina threatened the remaining Thanh Niên leadership in the Cochinchina Regional Committee (Nam Kỳ), which represented the organisation's moderate faction. Consequently, in late 1929, with support from the Central Committee in Hong Kong, the southern leadership dissolved Thanh Niên and reconstituted it as the Communist Party of Annam (Annam Công Sản Đảng). The two successor factions—the Communist Party of Indochina and the Annam Communist Party—competed for leadership of the domestic revolutionary movement.

== The political landscape of Guangzhou in the 1920s ==
The establishment of Thanh Niên in Guangzhou in the mid-1920s can be better understood when placed within the broader political environment of the city at the time. Although few sources examine this context in detail, some works provide fragments of the wider background, usually as ancillary information to the League's history. Many narratives emphasise Nguyen Ai Quoc's role, often beginning with his participation in the Fifth Congress of the Communist International (Comintern), while giving limited attention to developments in Guangzhou before his arrival.

Situating Thanh Niên, along with Nguyen Ai Quoc and Tam Tam Xa, within the wider political milieu of Guangzhou highlights that the League's formation was shaped not only by Vietnamese revolutionary initiatives but also by the interactions among the Soviet Union (USSR)/Comintern, the Kuomintang (KMT), and the Chinese Communist Party (CCP). The shifting political dynamics of Guangzhou in the 1920s created conditions that enabled the organisation's foundation and early activities.

=== Vietnamese exilic revolutionaries in Guangzhou ===
Before the arrival of Nguyen Ai Quoc, a number of Vietnamese activists had already gathered in Guangzhou and were engaged in anticolonial activities. Sharing a common patriotic commitment and opposition to French colonial rule, these exilic revolutionaries and their organizations created a foundation from which Thanh Niên could later draw members.

Two organizations have been most frequently examined by scholars: Phan Bội Châu's Restoration League (Việt Nam Quang Phục Hội) in the 1910s and Tam Tam Xa in the 1920s. Several members of Tam Tam Xa, such as Lam Duc Thu, had previously taken part in Phan Boi Chau's Restoration League. Tam Tam Xa—a small radical group of Vietnamese revolutionaries—served as the nucleus from which Thanh Niên eventually emerged. Established in 1923, Tam Tam Xa consisted of seven quasi-intellectuals, including Le Hong Son and Ho Tung Mau, most of whom were elementary school teachers from the Nghe–Tinh region. The group became widely known for Phạm Hồng Thái's attempted assassination of the French Governor-General of Indochina, Martial Merlin, in 1924. The attempt failed, and Pham Hong Thai drowned himself while escaping. Despite French objections, the Guangdong Revolutionary Government buried him beside the tomb of the 72 martyrs of the Huanghuagang Uprising.

Between 1924 and 1925, after making contact with existing anticolonial groups in Shanghai, Guangzhou, and Wuhan, particularly members of Tam Tam Xa, Nguyen Ai Quoc reported to the Executive Committee of the Communist International (ECCI) that these groups "know nothing about politics, and much less about organizing the masses." Rather than founding a formal communist party at that stage, he decided to establish a new organization based on Tam Tam Xa that would serve as a training ground for young activists whose political views were still unformed despite their growing dissatisfaction with colonial rule. In this sense, the origins of the Vietnamese Revolutionary Youth League can be traced to Nguyen Ai Quoc's transformation of Tam Tam Xa into an explicitly Marxist–Leninist organization.

=== USSR cooperation with the KMT and CCP ===
Many sources note that Thanh Niên was established during the period when the CCP–KMT United Front was based in Guangzhou, which created a relatively favourable environment for Nguyễn Ái Quốc and Tâm Tâm Xã to form a communist organisation. The United Front itself resulted directly from the USSR's alliance with both the CCP and the KMT, following the advice of Comintern agent and KMT adviser Mikhail Borodin. In order to pursue their political goals within the political circumstances of 1920s China, all three parties had their own reasons to seek cooperation.

For the CCP, founded in 1921 in Shanghai and admitted to the Comintern in 1922, the Party was in its early developmental stage. Although it organised several workers' strikes and peasant movements and quickly mobilised significant numbers of people, it remained weak in comparison to the warlords and Sun Yat-sen's KMT. The CCP also lacked military power and weaponry during its early years, and it faced suppression from the French authorities in Shanghai as well as from warlords such as Wu Peifu. With the Comintern providing organisational guidance and strategic direction, the CCP sought a partner with military strength, political legitimacy, and a shared interest in resisting foreign imperialism and domestic warlordism.

For the KMT, particularly for Sun Yat-sen, although the Party was established in 1911 and ended the imperial system in 1912, its activities were repeatedly disrupted by the Beiyang government and other warlord factions. After a series of failed anti-warlord movements between 1913 and 1922, Sun began considering cooperation with the USSR and the CCP to counter feudal warlords and remove obstacles to KMT development. After several discussions, USSR–KMT cooperation began in 1923. Following Borodin's advice, the KMT agreed to reorganise the Party and admit CCP members, adopting a policy known as "allying with Russia and allowing cooperation with the Communist Party" (Chinese: 联俄容共). In January 1924, the First KMT Congress in Guangzhou formally established the First CCP–KMT United Front.

For the USSR and the Comintern, cooperation with local forces was essential for promoting the communist movement in China. Before the 1917 Russian Revolution, Marxism and the Bolsheviks were relatively unknown outside the Western world. After the Comintern was founded in 1919, its agents travelled eastward to advance communist and revolutionary movements, significantly influencing radical activists in China and Vietnam in the 1920s. The founding of the CCP was one such outcome. However, because the CCP remained weak, the USSR initially preferred partnerships with more influential actors, such as warlords or the KMT. After its proposal to cooperate was rejected by Wu Peifu, the USSR turned to Sun Yat-sen and, on 4 January 1923, agreed to "fully support the KMT" in exchange for Sun's promise to safeguard Soviet interests in Mongolia and in railway projects in the Middle East. Maring and Joffe were tasked with shifting Comintern policy from the "Irkutsk line" to full cooperation with the KMT. From 1923 to 1927, Soviet arms, funds, and military advisers were sent to the KMT via Borodin. The Whampoa Military Academy, located near Guangzhou, was also established under Borodin's guidance.

When Nguyễn Ái Quốc arrived in Guangzhou in late 1924, the United Front was preparing to expel warlord Chen Jiongming from the East River region. In March 1925, newly trained Whampoa cadets, fighting alongside the KMT Cantonese Army, defeated Chen’s forces. This victory strengthened the Guangdong Revolutionary Government and extended its control over the entire province, while also increasing the CCP's visibility and influence. Although Sun Yat-sen died in March 1925—widely seen as a major loss for both the USSR and the CCP—KMT rightists and CCP/USSR representatives temporarily set aside their differences to pursue the Northern Expedition. As a result, Guangzhou in 1925, under the Guangdong Revolutionary Government and its policy of cooperation with the USSR and the CCP, provided a supportive environment for communist organisations. Vietnamese revolutionaries in the city also received assistance and protection from Comintern agents and the CCP.

The relationships among the USSR, KMT, and CCP not only provided the political conditions for Vietnamese revolutionaries to establish Thanh Niên but also contributed to its eventual split. Chiang Kai-shek's 12 April coup and Wang Jingwei's 5 July coup brought an end to the United Front and significantly altered Guangzhou's political landscape. As the KMT launched campaigns against communists, Thanh Niên was forced to leave Guangzhou. Several key members fled, while others were arrested. The relocation of its headquarters left regional committees in Vietnam without unified leadership, leading to the factional divisions that ultimately fractured Thanh Niên.

== Support from China ==
The Revolutionary Youth League had a modest beginning. Before the League was founded, members of Tâm Tâm Xã were cared for by the Zhou family in Xiguan, Guangzhou; the household was headed by an elderly couple over 60 years old. Sympathetic to Vietnamese exiled activists, the couple shared their home with the group and treated them as family. In two letters written in early 1925 requesting assistance from the Soviet Union, Nguyễn Ái Quốc noted that he had used the US$150 remaining from his travel funds from Moscow to bring the first group to Guangzhou. He also complained that his salary from working for the ROSTA was insufficient to support his "students", stating that his "financial situation will be hopeless".

English-language sources—whether authored by Western or Vietnamese writers—rarely discuss in detail how Thanh Niên managed to sustain itself for several years in a foreign country that had itself been subject to colonial encroachment. According to Chinese communist accounts and biographies of CCP members, the League received significant support from the Chinese Communist Party, the Kuomintang (KMT) Left, patriotic merchants, and local residents in Guangzhou. The rental costs of its headquarters and operational expenses were largely covered by the CCP, patriotic merchants, and ethnic Chinese in Vietnam. Some records also suggest that the Canton Governor and Party Representative at the Whampoa Military Academy, Liao Zhongkai, provided assistance to the League. Members did not cook for themselves; meals were provided by the Peasant Movement Training Institute (PMTI), which was jointly administered by CCP and KMT members involved in peasant movements in southern China.

Beyond economic support, the CCP and the KMT Left also assisted in training Vietnamese revolutionaries. Several CCP and KMT Left figures—many of whom served as instructors or officers at the Whampoa Military Academy—were invited to the "Special Political Training Class" to deliver lectures. These included Zhou Enlai, Li Fuchun, Zhang Tailei, Peng Pai, and Chen Yannian, among others. Some of these lecturers had been acquaintances of Nguyễn Ái Quốc during his years in France and Moscow. Hồ Tùng Mậu often interpreted their lectures from Chinese into Vietnamese. Some recruits also attended meetings and public events at the PMTI and Sun Yat-sen University.

The Whampoa Military Academy—established by Mikhail Borodin and General Vasily Blyukher (Galen)—also admitted and trained a considerable number of Vietnamese students sent by the League. Many of these students later continued their studies in Moscow, joined the CCP, or participated in Chinese military campaigns such as the Northern Expedition, the Long March, and even the Second Sino-Japanese War. Others were sent to Vietnam or Siam to recruit supporters and organise revolutionary activities.

In cooperation with Vietnamese revolutionaries, the CCP Seamen's Union also helped transport pamphlets and periodicals, including Thanh Niên, to Vietnam, Siam, and Laos, promoting the League's anticolonial activities both in Vietnam and among overseas Vietnamese communities in Southeast Asia.

After April 1927, the League faced increasing difficulties following the collapse of the CCP–KMT United Front and the ensuing persecution of communists under Chiang Kai-shek. It was eventually forced to relocate to Kowloon. Even then, the Guangzhou Provincial Committee attempted to assist by helping resolve the League's living difficulties and by working to restore communication between the Comintern and the League's regional branches in Vietnam.

== See also ==
- Hội Việt Nam Cách mạng Thanh niên (Vietnamese)
- Indochinese Communist Party (1929–1930)
- Annam Communist Party
- Indochinese Communist Party
- Communist Party of Vietnam
- Political organizations and Armed forces in Vietnam
- Nghe-Tinh Revolt
- CCP-KMT First United Front
- History of the Communist Party of Vietnam
