= Phạm Hồng Thái =

Vietnamese revolutionary (1896–1924)

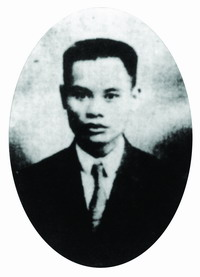
Pham Hong Thai

Phạm Hồng Thái (1896–1924) was a Vietnamese activist, revolutionary and a member of Đông Du. He was responsible for the assassination attempt on Martial Merlin, the governor-general of French Indochina then visiting Guangzhou, China.

Disguised as a journalist at the party given in Merlin's honor, Pham Hong Thai detonated the explosive device but failed to kill Merlin at the banquet. Hunted down by authorities, he chose to drown himself in the Pearl River to avoid capture. He was interred in the Huanghuagang Cemetery (Hoàng Hoa Cương in Vietnamese) Cemetery in Guangzhou next to 72 Chinese revolutionaries who died in the Second Guangzhou uprising. Even though the assassination were unsuccessful, it fanned nationalist sentiments in Vietnam against French rule and intensified agitation among activists.
