= Lao Bảo Prison =

Vietnamese prison

Lao Bao Prison is a prison situated in Lao Bảo, Quảng Trị, 22 km from Khe Sanh, in the village of Duy Tan, commune of TanThanh, district of Hướng Hóa, to the west is the Sepon river, to the east is the high mountain. The prison was constructed in 1908 by the French colonists on an area of about 10ha, completely isolated from the populated areas.

The prison was one of the 5 largest prisons in French Indochina at that time.

The prison was built for local political prisoners. The prison initially had cell A and cell B, including two blocks of cells made of bamboo, earth walls, 15m long 4m high, 5 meters wide. There were only one exit and one entry, it used to be dark inside. From 1931-1932, the French colonists built two more new cells. The new houses had stone wall, concrete floor.

On 17-03-Bảo Đại 9 (30 April 1934) the Bảo Đại Emperor issued an imperial decree stating that only convicted criminals belonging to the male sex not younger than 21 and not older than 50 may be imprisoned at the Lao Bảo Prison, and that criminals convicted under the law common to all may not be grouped together with political prisoners. The decree further stipulated that the management of the Lao Bảo Prison and the Ban Mê Thuột Prison was left to the European civil servants and wasn't the responsibility of the government of the Nguyễn dynasty, unlike other prisons within the territory of the French protectorate of Annam.

== Today ==
Today, this prison is classified as a special historical site by the Vietnamese government, it is also a local popular tourists destination.
