= Communist Party of Annam =

Political party in Southeast Asia

Communist Party of Annam An Nam cộng sản Đảng
- Leader: Châu Văn Liêm; Nguyễn Thiệu; Trần Não; Hồ Tùng Mậu; Lê Hồng Sơn
- Secretary-General: Châu Văn Liêm
- Founded: January 7, 1929
- Dissolved: January 2, 1930
- Preceded by: Vietnamese Revolutionary Youth League
- Merged into: Communist Party of Vietnam
- Headquarters: Saigon
- Ideology: Communism; Vietnamese nationalism

Communist Party of Annam (Vietnamese: An Nam cộng sản Đảng, chữ Hán: 安南共産党) was a Vietnamese political party that existed from August 1929 until February 1930. (Annam was the common name of Vietnam at that time.)

== History ==
The party was created by leaders of the Communist Youth League. The Communist Youth League was formed by Ho Chi Minh in 1926 as a section of the Vietnam Revolutionary Youth League. Initially based in Guangzhou, southern China, the League created publications that were clandestinely smuggled into Vietnam. In 1927 the communists were expelled from Guangzhou by Chiang Kai-shek.

The league's first (and only) congress was held in Hong Kong in May 1929. It was marred by factionalism that mirrored the struggle between Joseph Stalin and Nikolai Bukharin then going on in Moscow. Inspired by Stalin's call for communist separatism, Trần Văn Cung, head of league's Tonkin section, led a walkout by a group of delegates. Cung returned to Vietnam and, on June 17, founded the Communist Party of Indochina. Other Vietnamese communist leaders were reluctant to act decisively until the outcome in Moscow was clear. In August, the remaining leadership of the league founded the CPA. The party was led by a five-member "special branch", including Châu Vǎn Liêm (Secretary), Nguyễn Thiệu, Lê Hồng Sơn, Hồ Tùng Mậu,... and Le Quang Dat.

On October 27, 1929, Comintern issued a letter criticizing the CPA, praising the ICP, and directing that a conference be held to reunite the parties. (This was the method of resolving the dispute proposed by the CPA leadership.) The two parties merged in February 1930 at a conference in Kowloon, forming the Communist Party of Vietnam. Ho Chi Minh, at this time a representative of Comintern, presided over this conference.
