= Nghi Lộc district =

Coordinates: 18.833°N 105.583°E

Nghi Lộc district Huyện Nghi Lộc
- District
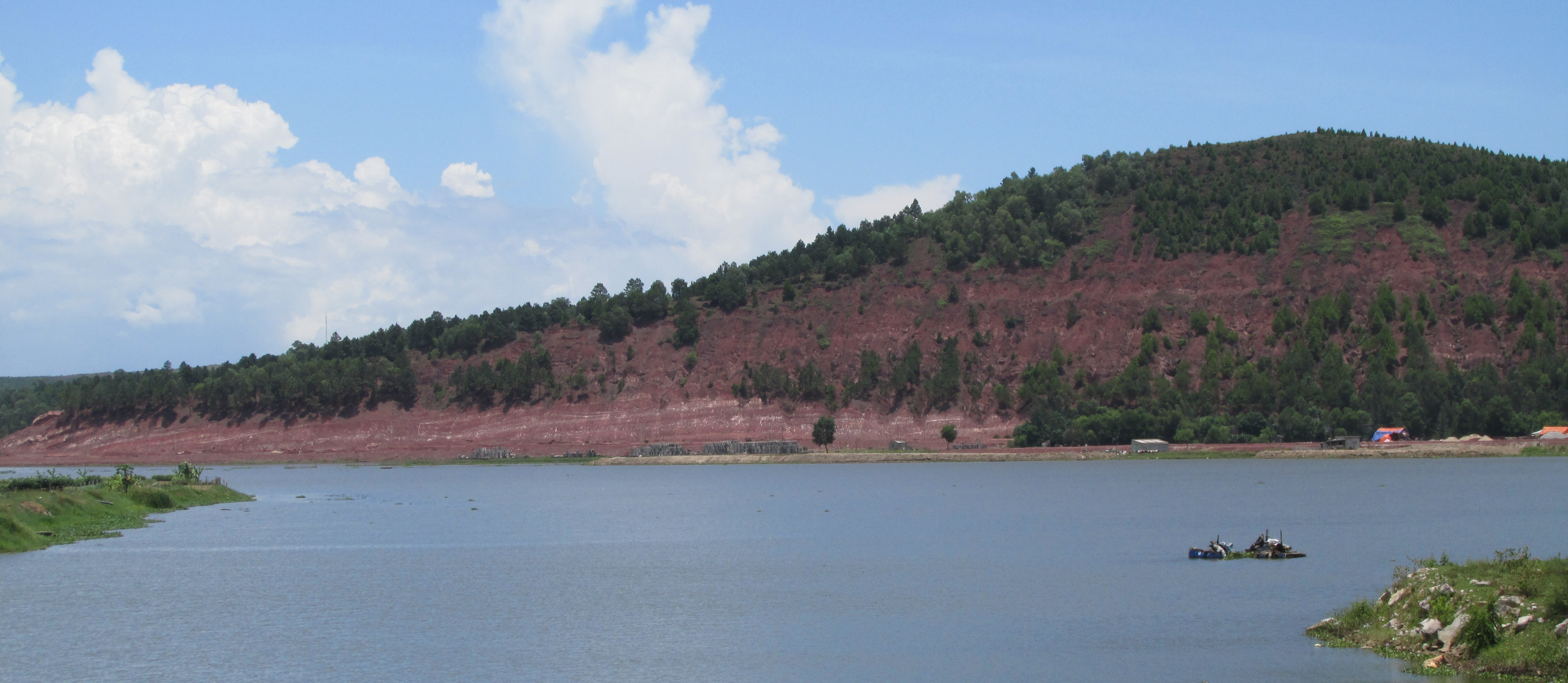
- Interactive map of Nghi Lộc district
- Country: Vietnam
- Region: North Central Coast
- Province: Nghệ An
- Capital: Quán Hành

Area
  - Total: 142 sq mi (369 km^{2})

Population (2003)
  - Total: 214,209
- Time zone: UTC+07:00 (Indochina Time)

Nghi Lộc is a former rural district of Nghệ An province in the North Central Coast region of Vietnam. As of 2003 the district had a population of 214,209. The district covers an area of 369 km^{2}. The district capital lies at Quán Hành.

Modern Nghi Diên village is the site of the old Xã Đoài Catholic Grand Seminary, and of the Xã Đoài orange.

== Notable people ==
Phạm Phương Thảo (born 1982), singer, songwriter, and composer
