= Communist Party of Indochina =

Political party in Southeast Asia

Communist Party of Indochina Đông Dương Cộng sản Đảng
- Secretary: Trần Văn Cung
- Founded: June 17, 1929
- Dissolved: February 3, 1930
- Preceded by: Vietnam Revolutionary Youth League
- Merged into: Communist Party of Vietnam
- Headquarters: Hanoi
- Newspaper: Búa liềm Bônsơvích; Cờ Cộng sản
- Ideology: Communism; Marxism-leninism; Anti-colonialism; Vietnamese nationalism
- Political position: Far-left

Party flag

The Communist Party of Indochina (Vietnamese: Đông Dương Cộng sản Đảng) was one of three predecessors of the Communist Party of Vietnam, along with the Communist Party of Annam and the Communist League of Indochina.

== History ==
In March 1929, radical members of the Vietnam Revolutionary Youth League (VARY) including Trần Văn Cung, Nguyễn Đức Cảnh, Trịnh Đình Cửu, Đỗ Ngọc Du, Dương Hạc Đính, Ngô Gia Tự, Kim Tôn formed the first communist cell in French Indochina. This cell claimed its mission to become the core of a future communist party. Trần Văn Cung was voted to be the secretary. Together with Trịnh Đình Cửu and Kim Tôn he was voted to attend the congress of VARY, held in Hong Kong in May 1929. In this congress, these attendees proposed to transform VARY into a communist party. Their proposal was rejected by the VARY leadership. Trần, Trịnh, and Kim walked out. They were later expelled from the Youth League.

On 17 June 1929, the cell met in Hanoi and decided to form the Communist Party of Indochina. They issued the party's political proclamation, led by Trịnh Đình Cửu, Nguyễn Đức Cảnh, Ngô Gia Tự, Trần Văn Cung. The party published Búa Liềm (Hammer and Sickle) newspaper. Soon thereafter, the Communist Party of Annam was formed in Cochinchina in August 1929 and the New Revolutionary Party of Vietnam was transformed into the Communist League of Indochina in January 1930.

In 1930 following appeals for unity by Nguyễn Ái Quốc, the Communist Party of Indochina united with the Communist Party of Annam and the Communist League of Indochina and founded the Communist Party of Vietnam.
