= Tân Việt Revolutionary Party =

New Vietnam Revolutionary Party Tân-Việt Kách-mệnh Đảng
- Secretary-General: Đào Duy Anh
- Founded: July 14, 1928
- Dissolved: January 1, 1930
- Preceded by: Hội Phục Việt
- Succeeded by: Communist League of Indochina
- Headquarters: Huế
- Membership (1928): 612
- Ideology: Vietnamese nationalism Anti-colonialism; Left-wing nationalism Communism (factions)
- Political position: Left-wing to far-left
- Slogan: Đánh đổ đế quốc chủ nghĩa đặng kiến thiết một xã hội bình đẳng và bác ái mới (To overthrow imperialism in order to build a new society of equality and fraternity)

The New Vietnam Revolutionary Party or Revolutionary Party of the New Vietnam (Vietnamese: Tân-Việt Kách-mệnh Đảng) 1925–1930, was revolutionary nationalist party in Vietnam's early independence movement founded by Nguyễn Thị Minh Khai.

== History ==
During the 1920s openly democratic patriotic movement in the French Indochina, on July 14, 1925, a number of students from Indochina Pedagogical College and a number of former political prisoners in Annam established Hội Phục Việt (Vietnamese Restoration Association).

The group began having contacts with revolutionary groups in China and Siam after the First World War.

After being exposed after spreading leaflets asking the French authorities to release patriot Phan Bội Châu (November 1925). Hội Phục Việt changed its name several times and eventually changed to Tân Việt Revolutionary Party (July 1928).

Tân Việt Revolutionary Party gathered young intellectuals and patriotic petty bourgeois youth, operating mainly in Annam. Born and operating while the Vietnamese Revolutionary Youth League was thriving, the theories of Marxism–Leninism had a great influence, Tân Việt Revolutionary Party attracted a lot of patriotic young people to participate.

During its operation, the party split into two left-wing and right-wing (nationalist) tendencies. In the end, the leftist tendency to embrace communism prevailed. Some members were transferred to study at the Revolutionary Youth League (founded in November 1925, led by Hồ Chí Minh), actively preparing for the establishment of a new party following the path of the Communist Party of Vietnam.

Internal factional conflict weakened the party. In 1929 the communists broke away, reforming as the Indochinese Communist League (Đông Dương Cộng sản Liên đoàn) which was one of the three communist groups of 1929–1930 which formed the base of the Vietnamese Communist Party. The rest of the party was dissolved in 1930, after a police crackdown banned it.

== See also ==
- Vietnamese Revolutionary Youth League
- Indochinese Communist League
