= Svay Rieng =

Svay Rieng may refer to:

- Svay Rieng (town), Cambodia
- Svay Rieng Province, Cambodia

== See also ==
- Preah Khan Reach Svay Rieng FC, a Cambodian association football club
