= Svay Rieng municipality =

Svay Rieng municipality ក្រុងស្វាយរៀង Krong Svay Rieng
- Municipality
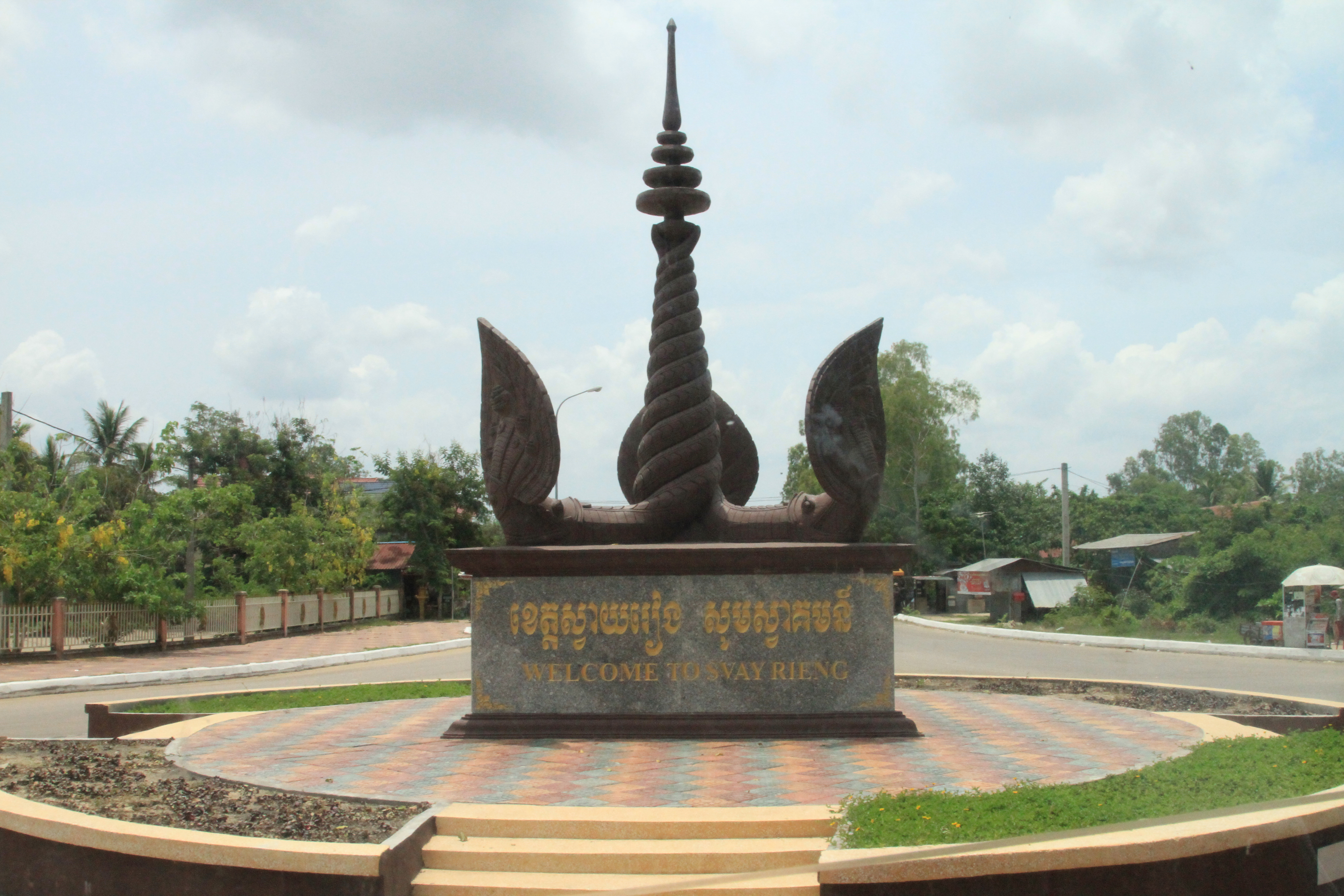

- Location in Cambodia
- Coordinates: 11°10′N 105°40′E
- Country: Cambodia
- Province: Svay Rieng
- Quarters: 7
- Capital: Svay Rieng

Government
  - Type: City municipality
- Elevation: 5 m (16 ft)

Population (2008)
  - Total: 40,536
- Time zone: UTC+7 (ICT)
- District Code: 2006

Svay Rieng municipality (Khmer: ក្រុងស្វាយរៀង, pronounced [sʋaːj riəŋ]) is a municipality located in Svay Rieng province, Cambodia. It surrounds the provincial capital city of Svay Rieng. According to the 1998 census of Cambodia, it had a population of 21,205.

== Administration ==
| No. | District code | Sangkat (quarters) | Phum (villages) |
|---|---|---|---|
| 1 | 2006-01 | Svay Rieng សង្កាត់ស្វាយរៀង | |
| 2 | 2006-02 | Prey Chhlak សង្កាត់ព្រៃឆ្លាក់ | |
| 3 | 2006-03 | Koy Trabaek សង្កាត់គយត្របែក | |
| 4 | 2006-04 | Pou Ta Hao សង្កាត់ពោធិ៍តាហោ | |
| 5 | 2006-05 | Chek សង្កាត់ចេក | |
| 6 | 2006-06 | Svay Toeu សង្កាត់ស្វាយតឿ | |
| 7 | 2006-07 | Sangkhoar សង្កាត់សង្ឃ័រ | |
