= Chantrea District =

Chantrea ចន្រ្ទា
- District
- Chantrea District ស្រុកចន្ទ្រា
- Location of Chantrea District
- Coordinates: 10°55′07″N 106°05′42″E
- Country: Cambodia
- Province: Svay Rieng
- Time zone: UTC+07:00 (ICT)

Chantrea (Khmer: ចន្រ្ទា, UNGEGN: Chântréa [cantriə]) lit. 'The Moon', is a district located in Svay Rieng Province, Cambodia. The district is subdivided into 6 communes (khum) and 49 villages (phum). According to the 1998 census of Cambodia, it had a population of 45,439.

Sangkat (Communes)	Krom (Villages)
Chantrea	ចន្ទ្រា
Chres	ច្រេស
Me Sar Thngak	មេសថ្ងក
Prey Kokir	ព្រៃគគីរ
Samraong	សំរោង
Tuol Sdei	ទួលស្តី
