= Kampong Rou District =

Kampong Rou កំពង់រោទ៍
- District
- Kampong Rou District ស្រុកកំពង់រោទ៍
- Location of Kampong Rou District

- Location in Cambodia
- Coordinates: 10°55′N 105°55′E
- Country: Cambodia
- Province: Svay Rieng
- Time zone: UTC+07:00 (ICT)
- Geocode: 2002

Kampong Rou (Khmer: កំពង់រោទ៍, UNGEGN: Kâmpóng Roŭt [kɑmpɔŋ roː]) is a district (srok) located in Svay Rieng Province, Cambodia. The district is subdivided into 12 khums and 87 phums. According to the 1998 census of Cambodia, it had a population of 61,496.
