= Svay Rieng province =

Province in Cambodia

Svay Rieng Province ខេត្តស្វាយរៀង
- Province

Khmer transcription(s)
  - Khmer: ខេត្តស្វាយរៀង
  - UNGEGN: Khaet Svay Riang
  - ALA-LC: Khett Svāy Riang
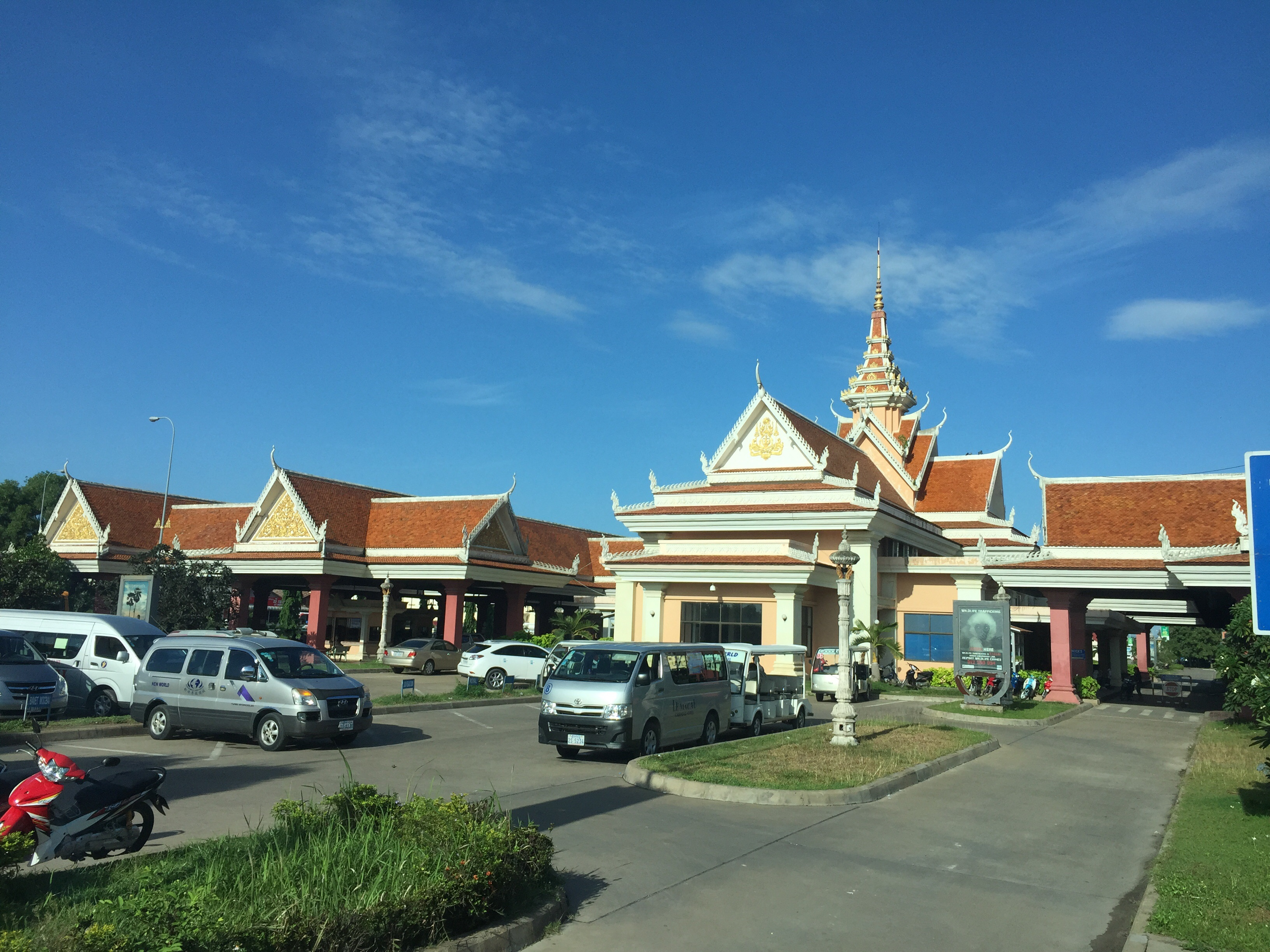
- Bavet

- Seal

- Map of Cambodia highlighting Svay Rieng
- Coordinates: 11°11′N 105°49′E
- Country: Cambodia
- Provincial status: 1907
- Capital: Svay Rieng
- Largest city: Bavet

Government
  - Governor: Peng Pouthisa (CPP)
  - National Assembly: 5 / 125

Area
  - Total: 2,966 km^{2} (1,145 sq mi)
  - Rank: 21st

Population (2024)
  - Total: ▲613,159
  - Rank: 13th
  - Density: 177/km^{2} (460/sq mi)
  - Rank: 6th
- Time zone: UTC+07:00 (ICT)
- Dialing code: +855
- ISO 3166 code: KH-20

Svay Rieng Province (Khmer: ខេត្តស្វាយរៀង, Khaet Svay Riang, [sʋaːj riəŋ]; lit. 'row of mangoes') is a province in Cambodia. Located in the southeast, the province juts into Vietnam (Long An and Tây Ninh) or Kampuchea Krom (Kampong Kho and Rong Domrey), which surrounds it to the north, east and south. The only other Cambodian province to border Svay Rieng is Prey Veng. The capital is Svay Rieng while the largest city is Bavet, which is the international border between Cambodia and Vietnam.

== Communes, districts and municipalities ==
The province is subdivided 6 districts and 2 municipalities, which are further divided into 80 communes.

ISO Code	Municipalities (ក្រុង)/District (ស្រុក)	ISO Code	Communes
20-01	Chantrea (ចន្រ្ទា)	20-01-03	Chantrea
20-01	Chantrea (ចន្រ្ទា)	20-01-04	Chres
20-01	Chantrea (ចន្រ្ទា)	20-01-05	Me Sar Thngak
20-01	Chantrea (ចន្រ្ទា)	20-01-08	Prey Kokir
20-01	Chantrea (ចន្រ្ទា)	20-01-09	Samraong
20-01	Chantrea (ចន្រ្ទា)	20-01-10	Tuol Sdei
20-02	Kampong Rou (កំពង់រោទិ៍)	20-02-01	Banteay Krang
20-02	Kampong Rou (កំពង់រោទិ៍)	20-02-02	Nhor
20-02	Kampong Rou (កំពង់រោទិ៍)	20-02-03	Khsaetr
20-02	Kampong Rou (កំពង់រោទិ៍)	20-02-04	Preah Ponlea
20-02	Kampong Rou (កំពង់រោទិ៍)	20-02-05	Prey Thum
20-02	Kampong Rou (កំពង់រោទិ៍)	20-02-06	Reach Montir
20-02	Kampong Rou (កំពង់រោទិ៍)	20-02-07	Samlei
20-02	Kampong Rou (កំពង់រោទិ៍)	20-02-08	Sam Yaong
20-02	Kampong Rou (កំពង់រោទិ៍)	20-02-09	Svay Ta Yean
20-02	Kampong Rou (កំពង់រោទិ៍)	20-02-11	Thmei
20-02	Kampong Rou (កំពង់រោទិ៍)	20-02-12	Tnaot
20-03	Rumduol (រំដួល)	20-03-01	Bos Mon
20-03	Rumduol (រំដួល)	20-03-02	Thmea
20-03	Rumduol (រំដួល)	20-03-03	Kampong Chak
20-03	Rumduol (រំដួល)	20-03-04	Chrung Popel
20-03	Rumduol (រំដួល)	20-03-05	Kampong Ampil
20-03	Rumduol (រំដួល)	20-03-06	Meun Chey
20-03	Rumduol (រំដួល)	20-03-07	Pong Tuek
20-03	Rumduol (រំដួល)	20-03-08	Sangkae
20-03	Rumduol (រំដួល)	20-03-09	Svay Chek
20-03	Rumduol (រំដួល)	20-03-10	Thna Thnong
20-04	Romeas Haek (រមាសហែក)	20-04-01	Ampil
20-04	Romeas Haek (រមាសហែក)	20-04-02	Andoung Pou
20-04	Romeas Haek (រមាសហែក)	20-04-03	Andoung Trabaek
20-04	Romeas Haek (រមាសហែក)	20-04-04	Angk Prasrae
20-04	Romeas Haek (រមាសហែក)	20-04-05	Chantrei
20-04	Romeas Haek (រមាសហែក)	20-04-06	Chrey Thum
20-04	Romeas Haek (រមាសហែក)	20-04-07	Doung
20-04	Romeas Haek (រមាសហែក)	20-04-08	Kampong Trach
20-04	Romeas Haek (រមាសហែក)	20-04-09	Kokir
20-04	Romeas Haek (រមាសហែក)	20-04-10	Krasang
20-04	Romeas Haek (រមាសហែក)	20-04-11	Mukh Da
20-04	Romeas Haek (រមាសហែក)	20-04-12	Mream
20-04	Romeas Haek (រមាសហែក)	20-04-13	Sambuor
20-04	Romeas Haek (រមាសហែក)	20-04-14	Sambatt Mean Chey
20-04	Romeas Haek (រមាសហែក)	20-04-15	Trapeang Sdau
20-04	Romeas Haek (រមាសហែក)	20-04-16	Tras
20-05	Svay Chrum (ស្វាយជ្រំ)	20-05-01	Ang Ta Sou
20-05	Svay Chrum (ស្វាយជ្រំ)	20-05-02	Basak
20-05	Svay Chrum (ស្វាយជ្រំ)	20-05-03	Chambak
20-05	Svay Chrum (ស្វាយជ្រំ)	20-05-04	Kampong Chamlang
20-05	Svay Chrum (ស្វាយជ្រំ)	20-05-05	Ta Suos
20-05	Svay Chrum (ស្វាយជ្រំ)	20-05-07	Chheu Teal
20-05	Svay Chrum (ស្វាយជ្រំ)	20-05-08	Doun Sa
20-05	Svay Chrum (ស្វាយជ្រំ)	20-05-09	Kouk Pring
20-05	Svay Chrum (ស្វាយជ្រំ)	20-05-10	Kraol Kou
20-05	Svay Chrum (ស្វាយជ្រំ)	20-05-11	Kruos
20-05	Svay Chrum (ស្វាយជ្រំ)	20-05-12	Pouthi Reach
20-05	Svay Chrum (ស្វាយជ្រំ)	20-05-13	Svay Angk
20-05	Svay Chrum (ស្វាយជ្រំ)	20-05-14	Svay Chrum
20-05	Svay Chrum (ស្វាយជ្រំ)	20-05-15	Svay Thum
20-05	Svay Chrum (ស្វាយជ្រំ)	20-05-16	Svay Yea
20-05	Svay Chrum (ស្វាយជ្រំ)	20-05-17	Thlok
20-06	Svay Rieng Municipality (ក្រុងស្វាយរៀង)	20-06-01	Sangkat Svay Rieng
20-06	Svay Rieng Municipality (ក្រុងស្វាយរៀង)	20-06-02	Sangkat Prey Chhlak
20-06	Svay Rieng Municipality (ក្រុងស្វាយរៀង)	20-06-03	Sangkat Koy Trabaek
20-06	Svay Rieng Municipality (ក្រុងស្វាយរៀង)	20-06-04	Sangkat Pou Ta Hao
20-06	Svay Rieng Municipality (ក្រុងស្វាយរៀង)	20-06-05	Sangkat Chek
20-06	Svay Rieng Municipality (ក្រុងស្វាយរៀង)	20-06-06	Sangkat Svay Toea
20-06	Svay Rieng Municipality (ក្រុងស្វាយរៀង)	20-06-07	Sangkat Sangkhoar
20-07	Svay Teab (ស្វាយទាប)	20-07-02	Kokir Saom
20-07	Svay Teab (ស្វាយទាប)	20-07-03	Kandieng Reay
20-07	Svay Teab (ស្វាយទាប)	20-07-04	Monourom
20-07	Svay Teab (ស្វាយទាប)	20-07-05	Popeaet
20-07	Svay Teab (ស្វាយទាប)	20-07-06	Prey Ta Ei
20-07	Svay Teab (ស្វាយទាប)	20-07-07	Prasoutr
20-07	Svay Teab (ស្វាយទាប)	20-07-08	Romeang Thkaol
20-07	Svay Teab (ស្វាយទាប)	20-07-09	Sambuor
20-07	Svay Teab (ស្វាយទាប)	20-07-11	Svay Rumpear
20-08	Bavet Municipality (ក្រុងបាវិត)	20-08-01	Sangkat Bati
20-08	Bavet Municipality (ក្រុងបាវិត)	20-08-02	Sangkat Bavet
20-08	Bavet Municipality (ក្រុងបាវិត)	20-08-03	Sangkat Chrak Mtes
20-08	Bavet Municipality (ក្រុងបាវិត)	20-08-04	Sangkat Prasat
20-08	Bavet Municipality (ក្រុងបាវិត)	20-08-05	Sangkat Prey Angkunh

These 6 districts and 2 municipalities are subdivided into 80 khums and 690 phums.

== Religion ==
Religion in Svay Rieng (2019 census)
1. Buddhism (99.8%)
2. Islam (0.10%)
3. Christianity (0.10%)
4. Animism and Other religions (0.10%)

== Culture ==
Svay Rieng province is the birthplace of the coconut dance.
