= Svay Rieng (town) =

Svay Rieng ក្រុងស្វាយរៀង
- City
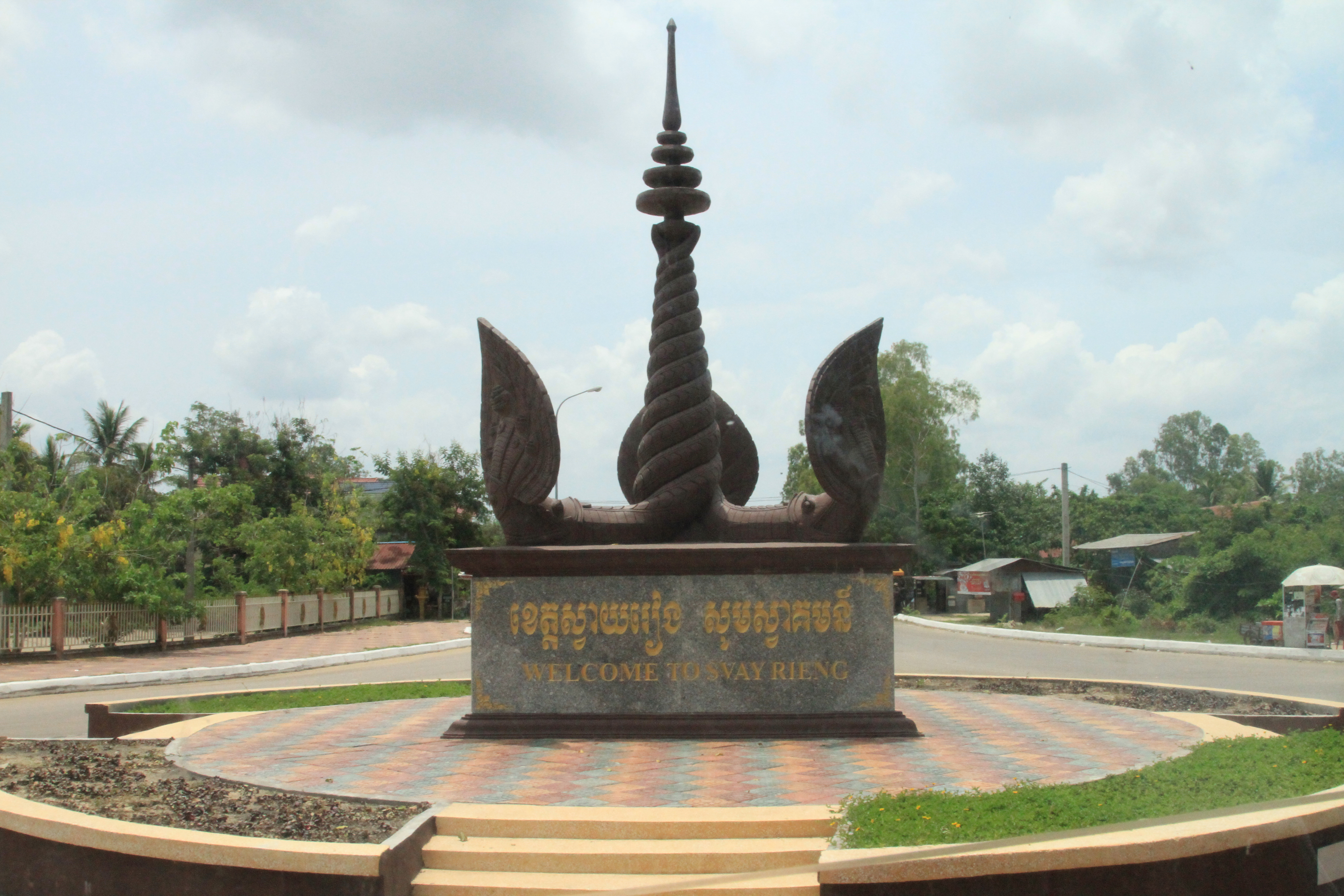
- A monument in the city center

- Location within Cambodia
- Coordinates: 11°05′N 105°48′E
- Country: Cambodia
- Province: Svay Rieng Province
- Elevation: 5 m (16 ft)

Population (2019)
  - Total: 41,424
- Time zone: UTC+07:00 (Cambodia)
- Website: https://rady.kampot.city/svay-rieng

Svay Rieng is the capital and 2nd largest city of Svay Rieng Province, Cambodia. The town is subdivided into 4 khums and 18 phums. The Svay Rieng University (SRU) and Svay Rieng Stadium with a capacity of 4000 is located in Svay Rieng.

== Climate ==
Climate data for Svay Rieng (1982–2024)
Month	Jan	Feb	Mar	Apr	May	Jun	Jul	Aug	Sep	Oct	Nov	Dec	Year
Mean daily maximum °C (°F)	32.1 (89.8)	33.0 (91.4)	34.2 (93.6)	33.9 (93.0)	34.9 (94.8)	33.5 (92.3)	33.0 (91.4)	32.9 (91.2)	33.1 (91.6)	32.0 (89.6)	31.9 (89.4)	32.3 (90.1)	33.1 (91.5)
Mean daily minimum °C (°F)	21.6 (70.9)	22.9 (73.2)	23.4 (74.1)	24.9 (76.8)	25.0 (77.0)	24.7 (76.5)	24.6 (76.3)	24.5 (76.1)	24.0 (75.2)	23.2 (73.8)	23.4 (74.1)	21.9 (71.4)	23.7 (74.6)
Average precipitation mm (inches)	19.5 (0.77)	12.6 (0.50)	43.6 (1.72)	127.3 (5.01)	158.4 (6.24)	201.7 (7.94)	231.8 (9.13)	191.7 (7.55)	327.4 (12.89)	348.3 (13.71)	139.3 (5.48)	43.9 (1.73)	1,845.5 (72.67)
Source: World Meteorological Organization
