= List of presidents of socialist Vietnam =

Seal of the State President of the Socialist Republic of Vietnam.

This is a list of state presidents (Vietnamese: Chủ tịch nước) of the Socialist Republic of Vietnam (Vietnamese: Cộng hòa xã hội chủ nghĩa Việt Nam) and its predecessor state, the Democratic Republic of Vietnam (Vietnamese: Việt Nam Dân chủ Cộng hòa), from the establishment of the position in 1946 to the present.

Vietnam is a one-party state and the president is generally considered to hold the second highest position in the political system, after the general secretary of the Communist Party of Vietnam. In its current incarnation, the officeholder is the head of state of the Socialist Republic of Vietnam, while the Prime Minister is the head of government. The president represents Vietnam internally and externally, supervises the work as well as preserving the stability of the national governmental system and safeguards the independence and territorial integrity of the country. The president appoints prime minister, vice-president, ministers and other officials with the consent of the National Assembly. The head of state is the de jure commander-in-chief of the Vietnam People's Armed Forces and chairman of the Council for Defence and Security, an organ of the National Assembly. Since Vietnam is a one-party state, with the Communist Party of Vietnam being the sole party allowed by the constitution, all but one^{[f]} presidents of the Democratic Republic and its successor Socialist Republic have been members of the party (or its predecessors) while holding office.

The modern office of the president of the Socialist Republic traces its lineage back to Hồ Chí Minh, the first president of the Democratic Republic.^{[g]} The office has no connection, or lineage, to the Provisional Revolutionary Government of the Republic of South Vietnam, headed by National Liberation Front revolutionary Nguyễn Hữu Thọ. There have been 14 presidents since the office's establishment in 1945. The current president is Tô Lâm, who is in office since 7 April 2026.

Hồ Chí Minh, the first officeholder, became president in 1945 after Vietnam's declaration of independence. Tô Lâm is the shortest-serving president, in office for 152 days during his first term (22 May — 21 October 2024), if not counting interim presidents. The longest-serving president was Hồ Chí Minh, with 24 years from 1945 to his death in 1969. He also served the most terms in office (1945, 1946, 1960, 1964) — tied with Tôn Đức Thắng, who was also in office for 4 terms (1969, 1971, 1975, 1976). The Constitution stipulates that the term of office of the president shall follow the term of the National Assembly (usually five years) and there is no limit to the number of re-elections. However, most presidents serve for one term. The president with the longest interim term is Nguyễn Hữu Thọ with 1 year and 96 days, longer than the term of official President Võ Văn Thưởng, which lasted 1 year and 19 days.

== Democratic Republic (1945–1976) ==
Status

Denotes acting president

No.	Portrait	Name (Birth–Death)	Term of Office			Political Party
No.	Portrait	Name (Birth–Death)	Took office	Left office	Time in office	Political Party
President of the Democratic Republic of Vietnam (1945–1975)
1		Hồ Chí Minh^{[b]} (1890–1969)	January 1946	2 September 1969 (Died in office)	23 years, 7 months	Indochinese; Communist Party/ Worker's Party of Vietnam
—		Huỳnh Thúc Kháng (1876–1947)	29 May 1946	21 October 1946	145 days	Independent
—		Tôn Đức Thắng (1888–1980)	2 September 1969	23 September 1969	21 days	Worker's Party of Vietnam
2		Tôn Đức Thắng (1888–1980)	23 September 1969	2 July 1976	6 years, 283 days	Worker's Party of Vietnam

== Socialist Republic (1976–present) ==
Status

Denotes acting president

No.	Portrait	Name (Birth–Death)	Term of Office			Election	Political Party
No.	Portrait	Name (Birth–Death)	Took office	Left office	Time in office	Election	Political Party
President of the Socialist Republic of Vietnam
(2)		Tôn Đức Thắng (1888–1980)	2 July 1976	30 March 1980 (Died in office)	3 years, 272 days	1976	Worker's Party/ Communist Party of Vietnam
—		Nguyễn Hữu Thọ (1910–1996)	30 March 1980	4 July 1981	1 year, 96 days	—	Communist Party of Vietnam
Chairman of the Council of State of the Socialist Republic of Vietnam
3		Trường Chinh^{[c]} (1907–1988)	4 July 1981	18 June 1987	5 years, 349 days	—	Communist Party of Vietnam
4		Võ Chí Công (1912–2011)	18 June 1987	22 September 1992	5 years, 96 days	—	Communist Party of Vietnam
President of the Socialist Republic of Vietnam
5		Lê Đức Anh (1920–2019)	23 September 1992	24 September 1997	5 years, 1 day	1992	Communist Party of Vietnam
6		Trần Đức Lương (1937–2025)	24 September 1997	27 June 2006 (resigned from office)	8 years, 276 days	1997	Communist Party of Vietnam
7		Nguyễn Minh Triết (1942–)	27 June 2006	25 July 2011	5 years, 28 days	2006	Communist Party of Vietnam
8		Trương Tấn Sang (1949–)	25 July 2011	2 April 2016	4 years, 252 days	2011	Communist Party of Vietnam
9		Trần Đại Quang (1956–2018)	2 April 2016	21 September 2018^{(died in office)}	2 years, 172 days	2016	Communist Party of Vietnam
—		Đặng Thị Ngọc Thịnh (1959–)	21 September 2018	23 October 2018	32 days	—	Communist Party of Vietnam
10		Nguyễn Phú Trọng^{[d]} (1944–2024)	23 October 2018	5 April 2021	2 years, 164 days	2018	Communist Party of Vietnam
11		Nguyễn Xuân Phúc (1954–)	5 April 2021	18 January 2023 (resigned from office)	1 year, 288 days	2021	Communist Party of Vietnam
—		Võ Thị Ánh Xuân (1970–)	18 January 2023	2 March 2023	43 days	—	Communist Party of Vietnam
12		Võ Văn Thưởng (1970–)	2 March 2023	21 March 2024 (resigned from office)	1 year, 19 days	2023	Communist Party of Vietnam
—		Võ Thị Ánh Xuân (1970–)	21 March 2024	22 May 2024	62 days	—	Communist Party of Vietnam
13		Tô Lâm^{[e]} (1957–)	22 May 2024	21 October 2024 (resigned from office)	152 days	May 2024	Communist Party of Vietnam
14		Lương Cường (1957–)	21 October 2024	7 April 2026	1 year, 168 days	October 2024	Communist Party of Vietnam
(13)		Tô Lâm^{[e]} (1957–)	7 April 2026	Incumbent	192 days	2026	Communist Party of Vietnam

== List of presidents by length of tenure ==
Rank	No.	Name	Party	Length of term
1	1	Hồ Chí Minh	ICP/WPV	24 years
2	2	Tôn Đức Thắng	WPV/CPV	10 years, 210 days
3	6	Trần Đức Lương	CPV	8 years, 276 days
4	3	Trường Chinh	CPV	5 years, 349 days
5	4	Võ Chí Công	CPV	5 years, 97 days
6	7	Nguyễn Minh Triết	CPV	5 years, 28 days
7	5	Lê Đức Anh	CPV	5 years
8	8	Trương Tấn Sang	CPV	4 years, 252 days
9	9	Trần Đại Quang	CPV	2 years, 172 days
10	10	Nguyễn Phú Trọng	CPV	2 years, 164 days
11	14	Lương Cường	CPV	1 year, 360 days
12	11	Nguyễn Xuân Phúc	CPV	1 year, 288 days
13	—	Nguyễn Hữu Thọ	CPV	1 year, 96 days
14	12	Võ Văn Thưởng	CPV	1 year, 18 days
15	13	Tô Lâm	CPV	152 days
16	—	Huỳnh Thúc Kháng	None	145 days
17	—	Võ Thị Ánh Xuân	CPV	105 days
18	—	Đặng Thị Ngọc Thịnh	CPV	32 days

== See also ==
- List of prime ministers of Vietnam
- List of heads of state of Vietnam
- List of spouses of Vietnamese presidents
- Leaders of South Vietnam

== Notes ==
a. These numbers are official. The "—" denotes acting head of state. The first column shows how many presidents there have been in Vietnamese history, while the second show how many presidents there was in that state.
b. Concurrently served as the Chairman of the Workers' Party of Vietnam.
c. Concurrently served as the General Secretary of the Communist Party of Vietnam from 14 July to 18 December 1986.
d. Concurrently served as the General Secretary of the Communist Party of Vietnam.
e. Concurrently serving as the General Secretary of the Communist Party of Vietnam since 3 August 2024.
f. Except Huỳnh Thúc Kháng, an independent who served as Acting President from May to October 1946.
g. Also known as North Vietnam following the 1954 Geneva Conference.

== Bibliography ==
- Koh, David (July–August 2008). "Leadership Changes at the 10th Congress of the Vietnamese Communist Party". Asian Survey. 48 (4): 650–672. doi:10.1525/as.2008.48.4.650. JSTOR 3738744.
- Van, Canh Nguyen; Cooper, Earle (1983). Vietnam under Communism, 1975–1982. Hoover Press. ISBN 9780817978518.
