= Vietnam People's Armed Forces =

Overall military and security establishment of Vietnam

- Lực lượng vũ trang nhân dân Việt Nam
- Emblem of Vietnam

- Emblems of the People's Armed Forces' components
- Motto: Không có gì quý hơn độc lập tự do (Nothing is more precious than independence and liberty)
- Service branches: People's Army; People's Public Security Forces; Militia and Self-Defence Forces
- Headquarters: Hanoi, Vietnam

Leadership
- Secretary of the Central Military Commission: Party General Secretary Tô Lâm
- (Vietnam) Chairman of the National Defense and Security Council: State President Tô Lâm
- (Vietnam) Deputy Secretary of the Central Military Commission & Minister of National Defence: Army General Phan Văn Giang
- Secretary of the Public Security Party Central Committee & Minister of Public Security: Police General Lương Tam Quang

The Vietnam People's Armed Forces (Vietnamese: Lực lượng Vũ trang nhân dân Việt Nam – LLVTNDVN) are the armed uniformed services and national security forces of the Socialist Republic of Vietnam. The Armed Forces are placed under the political leadership of the sole-ruling Communist Party of Vietnam and under the supreme command of the Central Military Commission, headed by the General Secretary. It consists of three components: the People's Army of Vietnam which is the military, the People's Public Security of Vietnam which is the law enforcement agency (police), and Vietnam Militia and Self-Defence Force which is the militia.

== People's Army of Vietnam ==
The People's Army of Vietnam (alternatively Vietnam People's Army; Vietnamese: Quân đội nhân dân Việt Nam) is the mainline military force of Vietnam. The PAVN includes: the Vietnam People's Ground Force (including major components like the Special Forces of Vietnam), the Vietnam People's Navy (including Naval Infantry, Naval Special Operation Force and Naval Air Force), the Vietnam People's Air Force (Air Defence - Air Force), the Vietnam Border Guard and the Vietnam Coast Guard.

== People's Public Security of Vietnam ==
The People's Public Security of Vietnam (Vietnamese: Công an nhân dân Việt Nam) is the main police, and security force of Vietnam.

The People's Public Security Forces is the core force of the people's armed forces in performing the task of protecting national security and ensuring social order and safety, and crime prevention and control.

The People's Public Security Forces has the functions, tasks, organization, command, and ensures that the operation, service regimes, and regimes and policies of the People's Police comply with the provisions of the Law on People's Public Security and regulations of the People's Public Security other provisions of relevant laws. The State builds a revolutionary, regular, elite, and step-by-step modernized People's Mobile Police Command; prioritize the modernization of some forces. The People's Public Security Forces shall coordinate with the People's Army and Militia and Self-Defense in performing national defense tasks. The coordination between the People's Public Security and the People's Army and Militia and Self-Defense shall comply with the Government's regulations.

== Vietnam Militia and Self-Defence Force ==
The Vietnam Militia and Self-Defence Force is the militia of Vietnam.

Militia and Self-Defense forces are mass armed forces that cannot separate from production and work; is the force protecting the Party, the government, the people's lives and properties, and the State's property in the locality and grassroots; ready to fight, to serve in combat, to be the core of the fight against the enemy in the locality and grassroots when there is a war; participate in building the all-people national defense, defense sector, civil defense, protect national security and ensure social order and safety, fight against crime. The State builds a strong and widespread Militia and Self-Defense force. The organization, tasks, service regime and regimes and policies of the Vietnam Militia and Self-Defense shall comply with the provisions of the Law on Militia and Self-Defense and other relevant laws.
