= 2024 Vietnamese presidential election =

2024 Vietnamese presidential election may refer to:

- May 2024 Vietnamese presidential election
- October 2024 Vietnamese presidential election
