= National Defense and Security Council (Vietnam) =

Vietnamese government agency

- Hội đồng Quốc phòng và An ninh

Agency overview
- Formed: August 19, 1948
- Jurisdiction: Vietnam
- Headquarters: 1 Hung Vuong, Ba Dinh, Hanoi, Vietnam
- Agency executives: Tô Lâm, President of Vietnam, Chairman; Lê Minh Hưng, Prime Minister of Vietnam, Vice Chairman; Lương Tam Quang, Minister of Public Security; Phan Văn Giang, Minister of Defence; Lê Hoài Trung, Minister of Foreign Affairs; Trần Thanh Mẫn, Chairperson of the National Assembly
- Parent agency: National Assembly

The National Defense and Security Council is a constitutional agency of the Socialist Republic of Vietnam, tasked with overseeing the defence and security of the country during a state of emergency or war. The Council is headed by the President of Vietnam.

== History ==
The National Defense and Security Council of the Socialist Republic of Vietnam traces its roots to the Supreme National Defence Council of the Democratic Republic of Vietnam (commonly called North Vietnam), established in 1948. In 1960, under the new constitution adopted in 1959, the name of the agency became the National Defence Council. The National Defense and Security Council took its current form in 1992 when a new constitution was promulgated.

== Organisation and membership ==
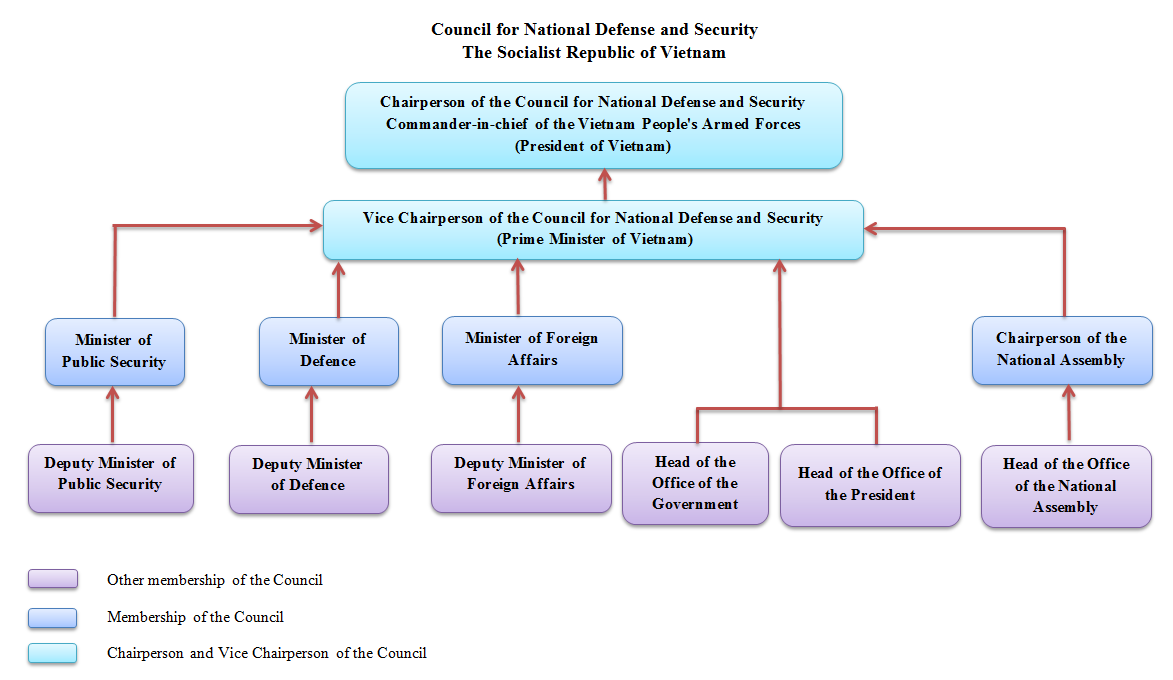
National Defense and Security Council in Vietnam

Under the Constitution of the Socialist Republic of Vietnam, the President of Vietnam is the commander-in-chief of the Vietnam People's Armed Forces, and the ex officio chair of National Defense and Security Council. The President nominates a list of members of the Council to the National Assembly for confirmation. Members of the Council need not be members of the National Assembly.

The Council operates based on majority rule.

The current membership of the Council includes: Tô Lâm, President and chair of the Council; Lê Minh Hưng, Prime Minister and vice chair of the Council; Trần Thanh Mẫn, Chairman of the National Assembly; General Phan Văn Giang, Minister of Defence; General Lương Tam Quang, Minister of Public Security; Lê Hoài Trung, Minister of Foreign Affairs.

== Role ==
The National Defense and Security Council is responsible for mobilising all resources, including manpower and materials, for national security and defence. Under the constitution, in the case of war, the National Assembly may delegate to the Council special responsibilities and powers, including declaring states of emergency and mandating actions by the government, military, public security forces, and foreign affairs officials. The chair of the Council can delegate his authority as commander-in-chief to the Minister of Defence as necessary.

== Proposal and petition ==
Vietnam passed a law defense power and the people's legitimate rights and security forces people like content security strategy doctrine National Socialist republic Vietnam the new period.

== List of chairmen ==
Number	Portrait	Name	Took office	Left office
Chairman of the Supreme Defense Council of the Democratic Republic of Vietnam (1945-1976)
1		Hồ Chí Minh	1948	1969
2		Tôn Đức Thắng	1969	1976
Chairman of the National Defense Council of the Socialist Republic of Vietnam (1976-1992) Chairman of the National Defense and Security Council of the Socialist Republic of Vietnam (1992-present)
2		Tôn Đức Thắng	1976	1980
—		Nguyễn Hữu Thọ	30 March 1980	4 July 1981
3		Trường Chinh	1981	1987
4		Võ Chí Công	1987	1992
5		Lê Đức Anh	1992	1997
6		Trần Đức Lương	1997	2006
7		Nguyễn Minh Triết	2006	2011
8		Trương Tấn Sang	2011	2016
9		Trần Đại Quang	2016	2018
—		Đặng Thị Ngọc Thịnh	21 September 2018	23 October 2018
10		Nguyễn Phú Trọng	2018	2021
11		Nguyễn Xuân Phúc	2021	2023
—		Võ Thị Ánh Xuân	18 January 2023	2 March 2023
12		Võ Văn Thưởng	2023	2024
—		Võ Thị Ánh Xuân	21 March 2024	20 May 2024
13		Tô Lâm	22 May 2024	21 October 2024
14		Lương Cường	21 October 2024	7 April 2026
15		Tô Lâm	7 April 2026	Incumbent
