= October 2024 Vietnamese presidential election =

- 21 October 2024
- Turnout: 91.86%
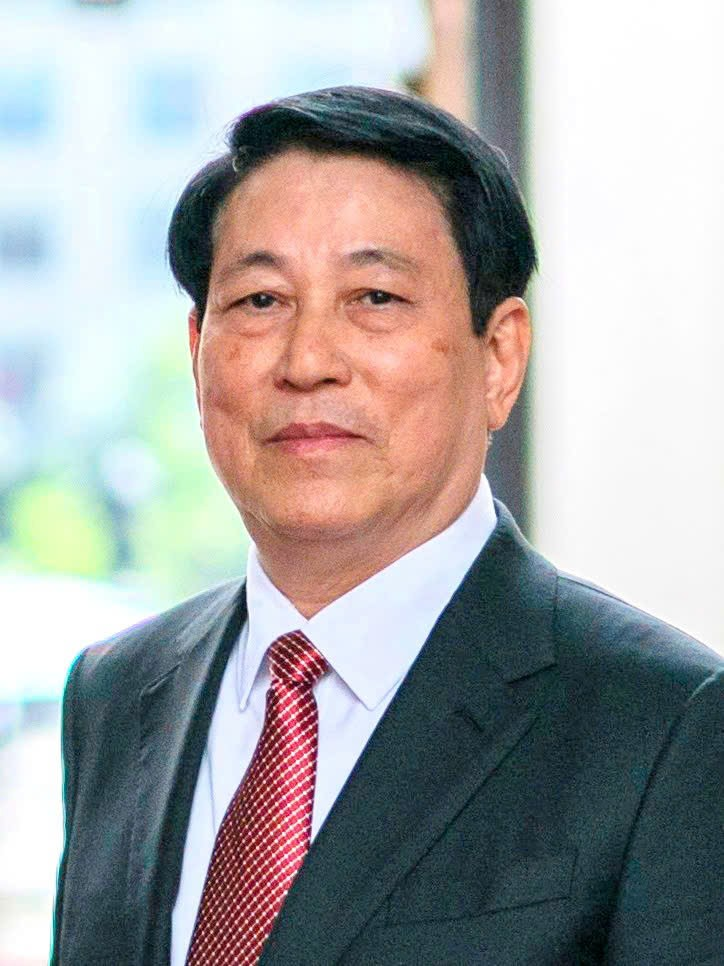
Nominee	Lương Cường
Party	Communist Party
Electoral vote	440
Percentage	100%
President before election
Tô Lâm
Communist Party
Elected President
Lương Cường
Communist Party

An indirect presidential election was held in Vietnam on 21 October 2024. The election took place just five months after the May 2024 election of President Tô Lâm who has since been appointed as the general secretary of the Communist Party of Vietnam, following the death of his predecessor, Nguyễn Phú Trọng, in July 2024.

Army General Lương Cường was elected as Vietnam's 14th president by the National Assembly of Vietnam, with all 440 delegates present voting in favor.

== Election ==
On 21 October 2024, the National Assembly formally convened to vote for Vietnam's next president. Lương Cường, as the only candidate in Vietnam's one-party system, won all votes from the 440 delegates attending.

Candidate	Party	Votes	%
Lương Cường	Communist Party of Vietnam	440	100.00
Total		440	100.00
Valid votes		440	100.00
Invalid/blank votes		0	0.00
Total votes		440	100.00
Registered voters/turnout		479	91.86
Source: VnExpress
