= Central Steering Committee on Anti-corruption =

Vietnamese governmental body

Flag of the Communist Party of Vietnam

The Central Steering Committee for Anti-Corruption (Vietnamese: Ban Chỉ đạo Trung ương về phòng, chống tham nhũng) is directly administered by the Vietnamese Politburo and chaired by the General Secretary of the Communist Party of Vietnam. It is responsible for directing, coordinating, inspecting and urging the prevention and combat of corruption and negativity throughout the country.

== Members (2021-2026) ==
=== Chairman ===
- Tô Lâm

=== Standing Vice Chairman ===
- Phan Đình Trạc, Politburo member, Secretariat member, Head of the Commission for Internal Affairs

=== Vice Chairmen ===
1. Trương Thị Mai, Politburo member, Permanent Member of the Secretariat, Head of the Central Organization Commission
2. Trần Cẩm Tú, Politburo member, Secretariat member, Chairman of the Central Inspection Commission
3. Nguyễn Khắc Định, Central Committee member, Vice Chairman of the National Assembly

=== Members ===
1. Lương Cường, Politburo member, Head of the General Department of Politics, Ministry of Defense
2. Nguyễn Hòa Bình, Politburo member, Secretariat member, Chief Justice of the Supreme People's Court of Vietnam
3. Nguyễn Trọng Nghĩa, Secretariat member, Head of the Central Propaganda Department
4. Đỗ Văn Chiến, Secretariat member, Chairman of the Vietnamese Fatherland Front
5. Lê Minh Hưng, Secretariat member, Chief of Office of the Central Committee
6. Lê Minh Trí, Central Committee member, Prosecutor General of the Supreme People's Procuracy of Vietnam
7. Trần Sỹ Thanh, Central Committee member, Auditor General
8. Lê Thị Nga, Central Committee member, Chairwoman of the National Assembly's Committee on Justice
9. Đoàn Hồng Phong, Central Committee member, Government Inspector General
10. Lê Thành Long, Central Committee member, Minister of Justice
11. Võ Văn Dũng, Central Committee member, Standing Deputy Head of the Commission for Internal Affairs

== Responsibilities ==
The committee has obligations that include advising and proposing to the Politburo and the Secretariat guidelines and orientations on mechanisms, policies, laws, and solutions to prevent and combat corruption. The committee is also in charge of discussing and deciding annual key working programs and anti-corruption plans.

The committee can direct and work with relevant agencies in dealing with serious corruption cases.

The Central Committee for Internal Affairs is the standing agency of the committee.

== Bibliography ==
- Quyết định số 162-QĐ/TW ngày 01/2/2013 về việc thành lập Ban Chỉ đạo Trung ương về phòng, chống tham nhũng (Decision 162-QD/TW dated 01/2/2013 on the establishment of the Central Steering Committee on Anti-corruption)
