= Tô Quyền =

Vietnam Army officer (1929–1996)

General Tô Quyền
- Born: Tô Quyền; 1929; Bắc Ninh, Vietnam
- Died: 18 November 1996 (aged 66–67); Hưng Yên, Vietnam
- Spouse: Đặng Thị Cam
- Children: 6 (including Tô Lâm)
- Relatives: Tô Long (Grandchild)
- Military career
- Allegiance: Vietnam
- Branch: Vietnam Army
- Service years: 1946–?
- Nickname: Tô Lâm (alias)
- Unit: Vietnam People's Public Security
- Awards: Hero of the People's Armed Forces; Order of Independence (runner-up)

Tô Quyền (Note: During the revolution he used the alias Tô Lâm.) (born 1929 – 18 November 1996) was a Colonel of the Vietnam People's Army, former director of the Department of Prison Management Police (C10), former head of Hải Hưng province Police Department, he is the father of the current General Secretary of the Communist Party of Vietnam, Tô Lâm.

== Biography ==
Tô Quyền was born in 1929 in Xuan Cau village, Nghia Tru commune, Van Giang district, Bac Ninh province (now Hung Yen province). He grew up in a family with a tradition of patriotism and participated in revolutionary activities very early (before the August Revolution in 1945). He made many contributions to the resistance and defense of the Communist Party of Vietnam.

His wife is Đặng Thị Cam. The couple had six children, including Tô Lâm – the current General Secretary of the Communist Party of Vietnam, who is the top leader of Vietnam since 2024.
