= 2026 Vietnamese presidential election =

- 7 April 2026
- Turnout: 99% ▲7.14 pp
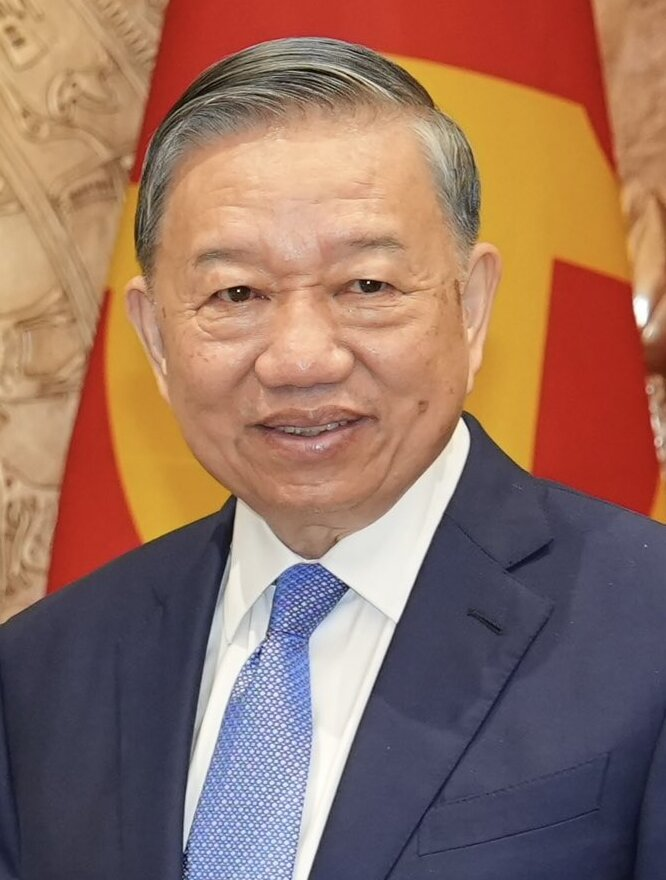
Nominee	Tô Lâm
Party	Communist Party
Electoral vote	495
Percentage	100%
President before election
Lương Cường
Communist Party
Elected President
Tô Lâm
Communist Party
- Turnout: 97% ▲0.4 pp
Nominee	Võ Thị Ánh Xuân
Party	Communist Party
Electoral vote	485
Percentage	100%
Vice President before election
Võ Thị Ánh Xuân
Communist Party
Elected Vice President
Võ Thị Ánh Xuân
Communist Party

A presidential election was held in Vietnam on 7 April 2026. The election took place after a day following the first session of the 16th National Assembly of Vietnam.

General Secretary Tô Lâm was elected as Vietnam's 15th president by the National Assembly of Vietnam, with all 495 delegates present voting in favor. The current Vice President Võ Thị Ánh Xuân was reelected as Vietnam’s Vice President for second term with all 485 delegates present voting in favor.

== Election ==
=== Election of President ===
Tô Lâm as the only candidate in Vietnam's one-party system, won all votes from the 495 delegates attending.

Candidate	Party	Votes	%
Tô Lâm	Communist Party of Vietnam	495	100.00
Total		495	100.00
Valid votes		495	100.00
Invalid/blank votes		0	0.00
Total votes		495	100.00
Registered voters/turnout		500	99.00
Source: Nhân Dân, National Assembly (in Vietnamese)

=== Election of Vice President ===
Võ Thị Ánh Xuân as the only candidate in Vietnam's one-party system, won all votes from the 485 delegates attending.

Candidate	Party	Votes	%
Võ Thị Ánh Xuân	Communist Party of Vietnam	485	100.00
Total		485	100.00
Valid votes		485	100.00
Invalid/blank votes		0	0.00
Total votes		485	100.00
Registered voters/turnout		500	97.00
