= General (Police Vietnam) =

Police rank

Army general Vietnamese: Đại tướng
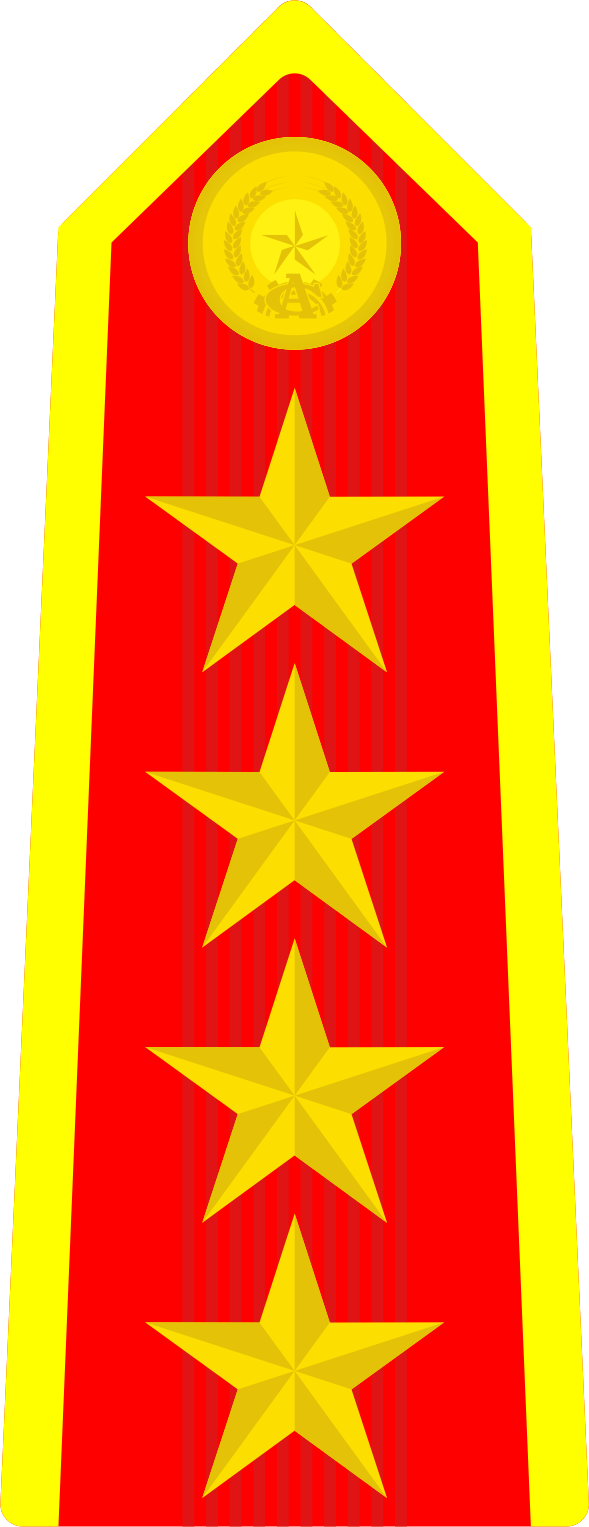
- Four-star insignia of the rank of the People's Public Security of Vietnam
- Country: Vietnam
- Service branch: People's Public Security of Vietnam
- Rank group: General officer
- Formation: September 1, 1959
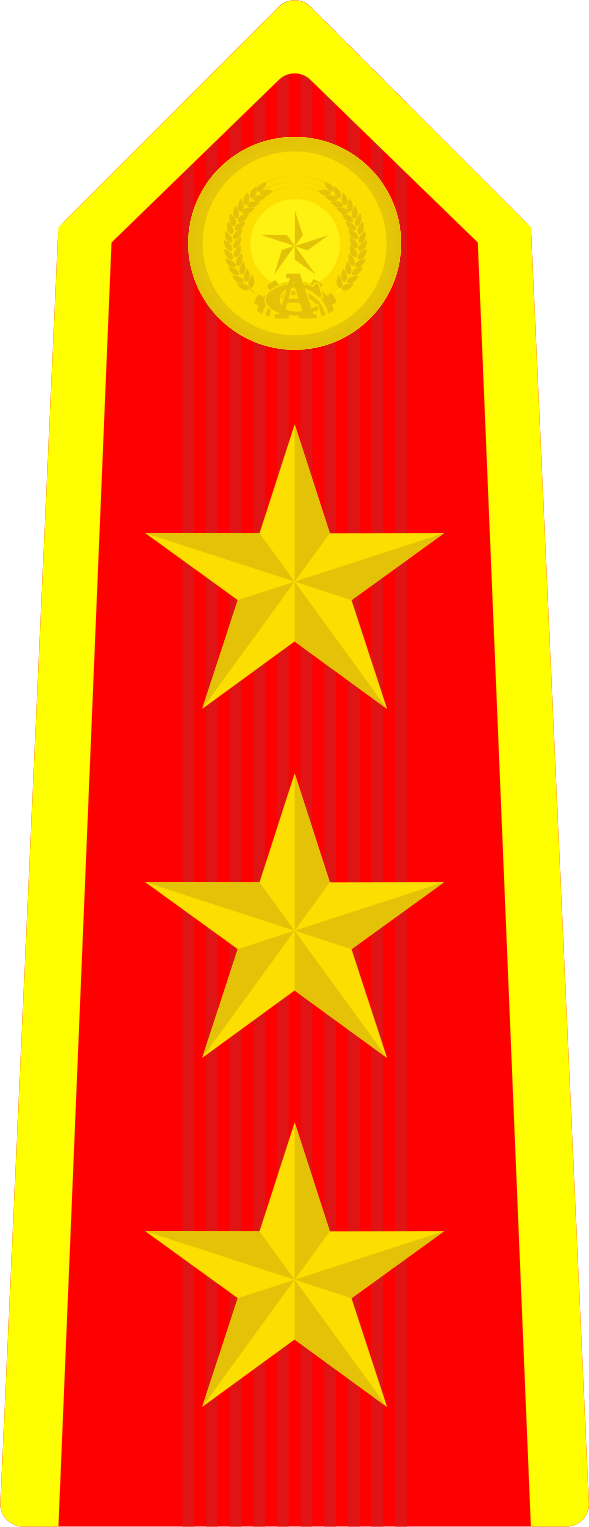
- Next lower rank: Colonel General
- Equivalent ranks: Army general

General of the People's Public Security of Vietnam is the highest rank in the Vietnam People's Public Security with an insignia of four gold stars. According to current Vietnamese law, the President is concurrently the Chairman of the National Defense and Security Council conferring, promoting, demoting or stripping this rank.

== Overview ==
The rank of General of the People's Public Security of Vietnam was first regulated by Decree 331/TTG dated September 1, 1959, providing for the rank system of the People's Armed Police (now the Vietnam Border Guards).

== List of Generals ==
No.	Name	Lifespan	Date of promotion
1	Mai Chí Thọ	1922–2007	1989
2	Lê Hồng Anh	1949–	2005
3	Trần Đại Quang	1956–2018	2012
4	Tô Lâm	1956–	2018
5	Lương Tam Quang	1964–	2024
