= 2023 Vietnamese presidential election =

Indirect presidential election in Vietnam

- 2 March 2023
- Turnout: 98.59%
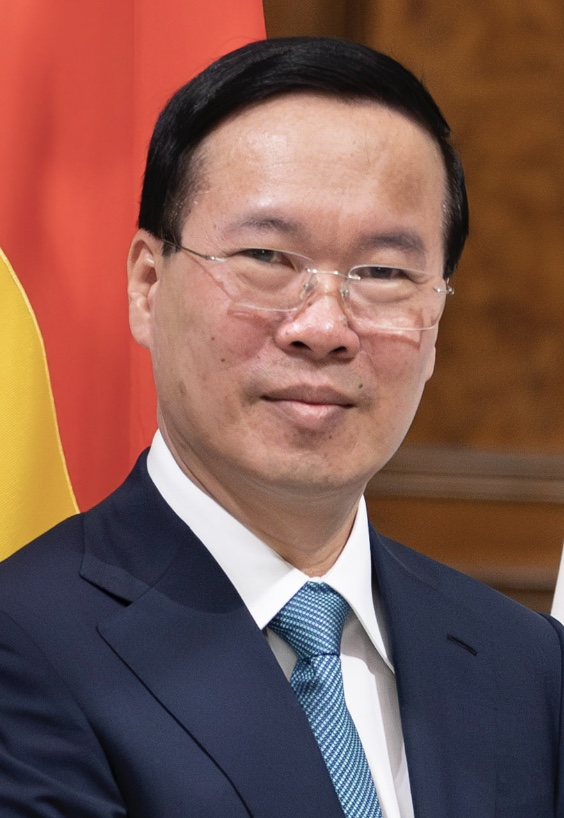
Nominee	Võ Văn Thưởng
Party	Communist Party
Electoral vote	487
Percentage	100%
President before election
Võ Thị Ánh Xuân
(acting)
Communist Party
Elected President
Võ Văn Thưởng
Communist Party

An indirect presidential election was held in Vietnam on 2 March 2023. The election took place early following the resignation of President Nguyễn Xuân Phúc in January as part of a broad anti-corruption purge led by the Communist Party's General Secretary Nguyễn Phú Trọng.

The sole candidate running within Vietnam's one-party regime, Võ Văn Thưởng, was elected by the National Assembly of Vietnam. Out of 495 legislators of the National Assembly, 488 were present at the time of the election. 487 voted for Thưởng while one other voting blank.

Thưởng resigned on 21 March 2024. A new presidential election was held on May 22 with, Tô Lâm voted to succeed him.

== Results ==
Candidate	Party	Votes	%
Võ Văn Thưởng	Communist Party of Vietnam	487	100.00
Total		487	100.00
Valid votes		487	99.80
Invalid/blank votes		1	0.20
Total votes		488	100.00
Registered voters/turnout		495	98.59
Source: VN
