= May 2024 Vietnamese presidential election =

- 22 May 2024
- Turnout: 97.13%
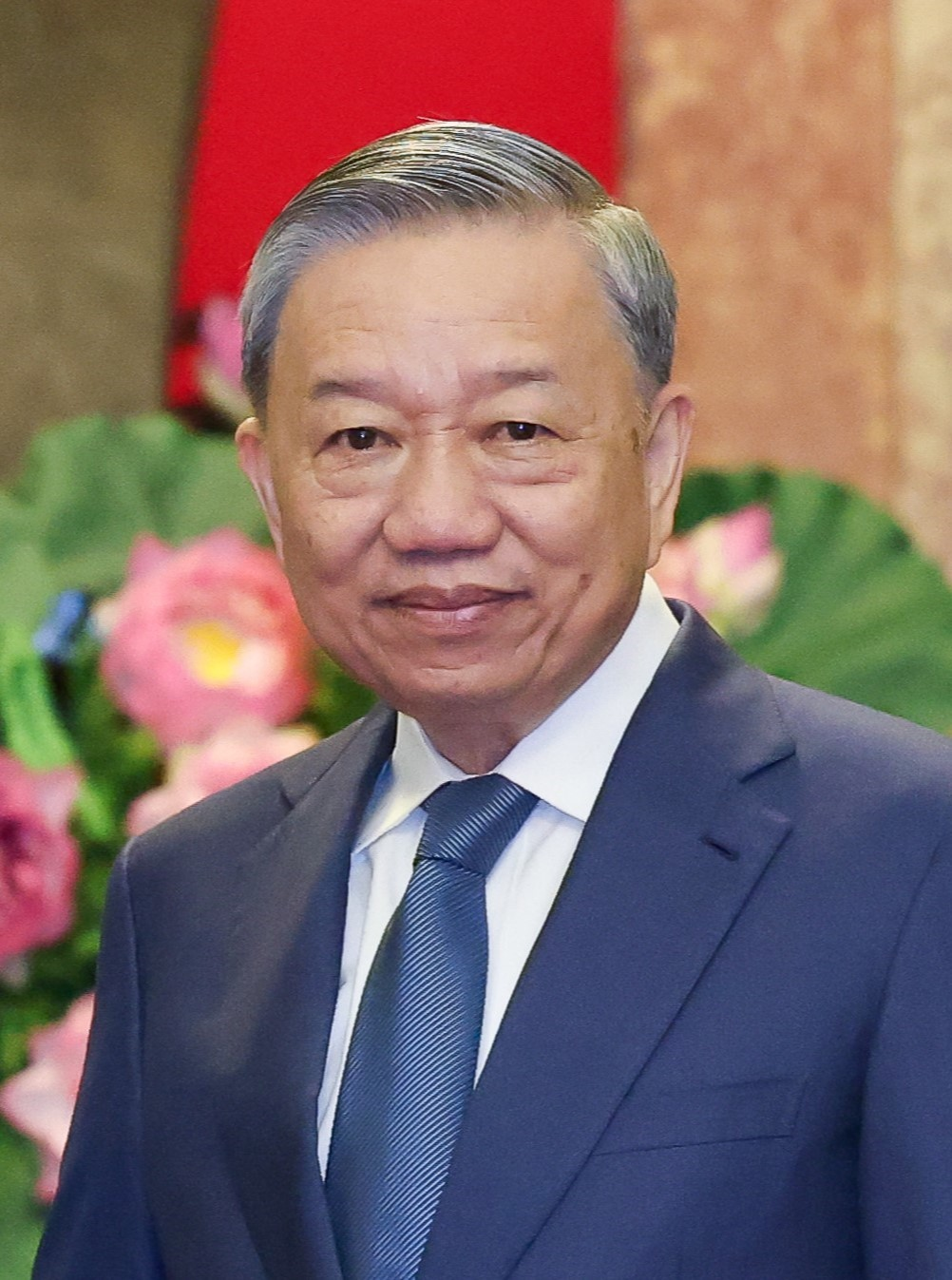
Nominee	Tô Lâm
Party	Communist Party
Electoral vote	472
Percentage	100%
President before election
Võ Thị Ánh Xuân
(acting)
Communist Party
Elected President
Tô Lâm
Communist Party

An indirect presidential election was held in Vietnam on 22 May 2024. The election took place just one year after the 2023 election of President Võ Văn Thưởng, who resigned on 20 March 2024 as part of a broad anti-corruption purge led by the Communist Party's General Secretary Nguyễn Phú Trọng.

On 18 May 2024, General Tô Lâm was nominated by the Central Committee of the Communist Party to become Vietnam's next president. The National Assembly of Vietnam formally convened on 22 May 2024 to elect Tô Lâm as Vietnam's 13th president, with 472 of 473 delegates attending voted for him and 1 voting blank.

== Background ==
=== Anti-corruption campaign and resignation of Võ Văn Thưởng ===
On 20 March 2024, Vietnamese state media reported that the Central Committee of the Communist Party had approved the resignation of then-President Võ Văn Thưởng due to having to "bear the responsibility of the leader" and "violating regulations on what party members are not allowed to do" and other unspecified reasons.

=== Nomination of Tô Lâm ===
At the 9th Conference of the Central Committee on 18 May 2024, several high-profile leadership reshuffles were announced. Tô Lâm and Trần Thanh Mẫn were nominated by the Politburo to serve as Vietnam's next president and parliament speaker, respectively, replacing Võ Văn Thưởng and Vương Đình Huệ who resigned in the past two months. According to state media, their nominations received "broad support" from the Central Committee membership.

Initially, it was announced by the National Assembly on 19 May that General Tô Lâm would retain his current post of Minister of Public Security alongside the presidency. This is an unprecedented move as there has not been a minister who concurrently serves as president since the country's reunification in 1976.

However, on 21 May, the National Assembly announced it would relieve Tô Lâm of his ministerial post following his election as president.

== Election ==
On 22 May 2024, the National Assembly formally convened to vote for Vietnam's next president. Tô Lâm, as the only candidate in Vietnam's one-party system, won all but one vote from the 473 delegates attending.

Candidate	Party	Votes	%
Tô Lâm	Communist Party of Vietnam	472	100.00
Total		472	100.00
Valid votes		472	99.79
Invalid/blank votes		1	0.21
Total votes		473	100.00
Registered voters/turnout		487	97.13
Source: DW, VP

== Reaction ==
=== Domestic ===
According to the Communist Party newspaper, General Secretary Nguyễn Phú Trọng is said to have congratulated the Party Central Committee on the unanimous decision to introduce General Tô Lâm as President and Trần Thanh Mẫn as Chairman of the National Assembly.

=== International ===
Immediately after Lâm's election and inauguration, General Secretary of the Lao People's Revolutionary Party Thongloun Sisoulith expressed his "excitement" and appreciated the trust of the "Party, State and People of Vietnam" in General Lâm.

According to Xinhua News Agency, General Secretary of the Chinese Communist Party Xi Jinping also sent a letter of congratulation, in which he was said to be "happy" that Mr. Lam held the position of President.

On the same day, Cambodian King Norodom Sihamoni also sent a congratulatory message to Vietnam and hoped that under Lâm's leadership, Vietnam and Cambodia would "be even closer."

First Secretary of the Communist Party of Cuba Miguel Díaz-Canel also sent a letter of congratulations to Tô Lâm on his appointment as President.
