= Bùi Tuấn Lâm =

Vietnamese human rights activist

Bùi Tuấn Lâm (born 1984), also known as Peter Lam Bui and online as Green Onion Bae (Vietnamese: Thánh rắc hành) is a Vietnamese human rights activist. In 2021, he went viral on social media after posting a parody of the Turkish chef and internet meme Salt Bae. In September 2022, he was arrested and charged with sharing anti-state propaganda, and is currently serving a five year prison sentence.

== Personal life ==
Lâm lived in the Thanh Bình ward of the Hải Châu district of Da Nang with his wife and three daughters. He is a Christian. Prior to becoming an activist, he worked as an advertising designer in Ho Chi Minh City. After losing his job and being evicted by his landlord, he returned to Da Nang where he opened a noodle stand.

== Activism ==
In 2013, Lâm took part in a civil society training programme held by Asian Bridge Philippines in Manila. Upon his return to Vietnam on 5 October, he was detained at Tan Son Nhat International Airport in Ho Chi Minh City and was held for 16 hours, alongside other Vietnamese participants.

Lâm was an active member of No-U FC, an association football club based in Hanoi that was founded in protest against the Chinese government's territorial claims on maritime areas administrated by Vietnam in the South China Sea. Lâm also took part in No-U FC's humanitarian work, including providing assistance to people experiencing poverty in rural areas, as well as victims of natural disasters. In February 2014, Lâm travelled to Geneva as part of a civil society campaign coinciding with Vietnam's Universal Periodic Review session at the United Nations Human Rights Council, representing No-U FC. When he returned to Vietnam on 24 February, he was once again detained at Tan Son Nhat International Airport and interrogated before his passport was confiscated, preventing him from leaving the country. As part of his anti-Chinese government activism, Lâm took part in a protest in Ho Chi Minh City on 4 June 2015 ahead of a planned state visit by Xi Jinping, the General Secretary of the Chinese Communist Party.

Lâm set up social media accounts on Facebook and YouTube (under the username Thánh Rắc Hành), which had 12,000 and 15,000 followers, respectively. His videos included information about his humanitarian work with No-U FC, as well as talks in support of political prisoners, such as Phạm Đoan Trang.

In April 2014, after visiting the home of former political prisoner Huỳnh Ngọc Tuấn, Lâm was physically assaulted by men in civilian clothing. In April 2020, during the COVID-19 pandemic, local police in Da Nang harassed Lâm for breaching quarantine guidelines in order to provide food to local people. Lâm had justified his actions, citing delays in the government's official programme to get food to people experiencing hardship.

== Arrest and imprisonment ==
After returning to Da Nang, Lâm's activism decreased, though he continued to post on social media. In November 2021, controversy broke out in Vietnam when a video of Tô Lâm, the Minister of Public Security, eating gold-encrusted steak while chef Nusret Gökçe, known as Salt Bae, sprinkled salt on it, at a restaurant in London following the 2021 United Nations Climate Change Conference in Glasgow. The meal, which occurred shortly after Lâm posted a video of him visiting the grave of Karl Marx, caused controversy in Vietnam, with criticisms levied at the cost of the meal due to the financial hardship many people faced due to the COVID-19 pandemic. Following this, Lâm posted a video online of him sprinkling green onion on noodle soup in a parody of Salt Bae. The video went viral, with Lâm being given the nickname "Green Onion Bae". Following the video, Lâm was interrogated by police on multiple occasions, and was pressured to close his noodle stand for several days.

In September 2022, Lâm was arrested and charged with conducting propaganda against the state under article 117 of Vietnam's penal code. He was arrested as he left his brother's home, and his whereabouts following his arrest were unknown for seven months. Prosecutors stated this was because Lâm had declined legal counsel, something which was denied by his wife, Lê Thanh Lâm. Lâm's official indictment stated he had posted 19 videos on Facebook and 25 on YouTube which "affected the confidence of the people in the leadership of the state".

Lâm's trial occurred on 25 May 2023 in Da Nang; his wife was forbidden from attending, and she and Lâm's brothers were physically removed from outside the courthouse and detained for several hours. During the hearing itself, the judge ordered that Lâm's defence lawyer leave the courtroom before he was able to finish his argument. During his trial, Lâm was reported to have said "I do not love the Communist Party, because I love Vietnam".

Lâm was sentenced to five years and six months in prison, to be followed by four years on probation. After starting his sentence in Hòa Sơn prison in Da Nang, as of October 2023 he is completing his sentence in Xuân Lộc prison in Đồng Nai province. Human Rights Watch described Lâm's sentence as "cruel and outrageous". Amnesty International had called for the charges to be dropped, describing them as "trumped-up" and stating he should be immediately and unconditionally released.

Lâm's appeal was heard on 30 August 2023, and the sentence was upheld. Lâm subsequently complained that he had been given no prior notice of hearing and so had not been able to prepare.

In February 2024, Lâm's wife reported ongoing harassment from the police, including having her produce seized from the family food stand. The police stated it was due to her selling it without a licence.
