= Minister of Public Security (Vietnam) =

Government minister in Vietnam

- Vietnamese: Bộ trưởng Bộ Công an

- Incumbent; Lương Tam Quang since 6 June 2024
- Ministry of Public Security
- Style: His Excellency
- Member of: Cabinet
- Reports to: President; Prime minister
- Appointer: President; with CPV Politburo introduction, advice and consent
- Term length: No fixed term
- Formation: 19 August 1945 (de facto)
- First holder: Trần Quốc Hoàn
- Deputy: Vice Minister of Public Security
- Website: bocongan.gov.vn

The Minister of Public Security is the Government of Vietnam member in charge of the Ministry of Public Security. The Minister of Public Security directs the management functions of the state for security; responsible organization, construction, management and the highest commander of the People's Public Security Forces. Moreover, the Minister of Public Security is a Member of the Politburo and Member of Council for National Defense and Security. The current Vietnamese Minister of Public Security is General Lương Tam Quang, since 6 June 2024.

== Chain of command ==
- President
- Prime Minister
- Minister of Public Security

== Lists of Ministers of Public Security ==
=== Director of the Police Department (1946–1948) ===
No	Name	Took office	Left office	Time in office
1	Nguyễn Dương (?)	February 22, 1946	June 8, 1946	106 days
2	Lê Giản (1913–2003)	June 8, 1946	April 5, 1948	1 year, 302 days

=== Director of the Central Public Security Department (1948–1953) ===
No	Name	Took office	Left office	Time in office
1	Lê Giản (1913–2003)	April 5, 1948	September 6, 1952	4 years, 154 days
2	Trần Quốc Hoàn (1916–1986)	September 6, 1952	August 29, 1953	357 days

=== Minister of Public Security (1953–1975) ===
No	Name	Took office	Left office	Time in office
1	Trần Quốc Hoàn (1916–1986)	August 29, 1953	August 1, 1975	21 years, 337 days

=== Minister of Home Affairs (1975–1998) ===
No.	Name	Took office	Left office	Time in office
1	Trần Quốc Hoàn (1916–1986)	August 1, 1975	February 7, 1980	4 years, 190 days
2	Phạm Hùng (1912–1988)	February 7, 1980	February 16, 1987	7 years, 9 days
3	Mai Chí Thọ (1922–2007)	February 16, 1987	August 9, 1991	4 years, 174 days
4	Bùi Thiện Ngộ (1929–2006)	August 9, 1991	November 6, 1996	5 years, 89 days
5	Lê Minh Hương (1935–2004)	November 6, 1996	May 7, 1998	1 year, 182 days

=== Minister of Public Security (1998–present) ===
No.	Portrait	Name	Took office	Left office	Time in office
1		Lê Minh Hương (1935–2004)	May 7, 1998	January 28, 2002	3 years, 266 days
2		Lê Hồng Anh (born 1949)	January 28, 2002	August 3, 2011	9 years, 187 days
3		Trần Đại Quang (1956–2018)	August 3, 2011	April 8, 2016	4 years, 249 days
4		Tô Lâm (born 1957)	April 8, 2016	May 22, 2024	8 years, 44 days
5		Lương Tam Quang (born 1965)	June 6, 2024	Incumbent	2 years, 149 days
