= Ministry of Public Security (Vietnam) =

Government ministry of Vietnam

Ministry of Public Security of Socialist Republic of Vietnam
- Bộ Công an
- Emblem of the Vietnam People's Public Security

Agency overview
- Formed: 19 August 1945 (de facto); 29 August 1953 (de jure)
- Preceding agency: Bureau of Integrity in Northern Vietnam (1945–1946); Bureau of Reconnaissance in Central Vietnam (1945–1946); Bureau of National Self-Defence Force in Southern Vietnam (1945–1946); Office of Public Security of the Ministry of Home Affairs (1946–1953); Deputy Ministry of Public Security (1953); Ministry of Public Security (1953–1975); Ministry of Home Affairs (1975–1998)
- Jurisdiction: Government of Vietnam
- Headquarters: 96 Nguyen Du, Hanoi
- Employees: Regular force: Not disclosed.; Semi-specialized force: 2,000,000 persons; Number of generals on payroll: 199 (2019)
- Annual budget: 4.19 billion USD (2021)
- Minister responsible: General Lương Tam Quang
- Deputy Minister responsible: Col. Gen Lê Quốc Hùng Col. Gen Lê Văn Tuyến Col. Gen Nguyễn Văn Long Col. Gen Phạm Thế Tùng Col. Gen Nguyễn Ngọc Lâm Col. Gen Lê Tấn Tới Col. Gen Đặng Hồng Đức
- Child agency: People's Public Security
- Website: bocongan.gov.vn

The Ministry of Public Security (MPS, Vietnamese: Bộ Công an (BCA)) is a governmental ministry of the Government of Vietnam, performing the function of state management of security, order and social safety; counterintelligence; crime prevention investigation; fire prevention and rescue; execution of criminal judgments, judgment enforcement not subject to imprisonment, custody or temporary detention; legal protection and support; State management of public services in sectors and fields under the Ministry's state management. It is headed by the Minister of Public Security.

The MPS manages the Vietnam People's Public Security, the Vietnamese uniformed police forces - while also responsible for domestic civilian administrative management, similar to the role of a standard Ministry of Interior (not to be confused with the Vietnam Ministry of Home Affairs).

Col. Gen. Lương Tam Quang has been Vietnam's Minister of Public Security since June 6, 2024.

== History ==
The foundation of the MPS started on August 19, 1945, when the Indochinese Communist Party formed three departments, consisting of the Security Service Bureau in Northern Vietnam, the Surveillance Service in central Vietnam, and the National Self-Defense Force Bureau in southern Vietnam. The three departments protected Ho Chi Minh and other CPV leaders in time for September 2, 1945 when independence was declared for the Democratic Republic of Vietnam. On February 21, 1945, Ho Chi Minh signed Decree 23, which unified the three bureaus into the Vietnam People's Police Department under the Ministry of Internal Affairs. Le Gian served as the first head of the MIA.

The Sub-Ministry of Public Security was established in February 1953 when it was under North Vietnamese control after Ho Chi Minh signed Decree 141/SL. At the time of establishment, it formally had seven departments and divisions. After the Government Council was presided over from August 27 to 29 of 1953, the Sub-Ministry was updated to the Ministry of Public Security.

In 1957, it first made official connections to the Stasi, the secret police of the German Democratic Republic. From 1972, Stasi head Erich Mielke provided technical assistance to the MPS in improving its intelligence and surveillance state operations throughout Vietnam, particularly after selected MPS personnel were sent to East Germany for further training.

On 12 June 1981, Decree 250/CP was signed, which defined the mandate of the Ministry of Interior. The Interior Minister then signed Decision 12-QD/BNV, which prescribed the powers of the General Department of Police (GDP) and its 12 subordinate units.

The Ministry of Public Security received many titles such as Hero of the People's Armed Forces 13 times, Gold Star Order (Vietnam) and 88 Ho Chi Minh Orders.

=== Controversies ===
Following the Fall of Saigon, the MPS imprisoned at least 200,000 to 300,000 former South Vietnamese military officers, government employees, and supporters of the former government of South Vietnam in re-education camps, where "both physical torture and mental abuse were common".

The MPS has also played a role in the surveillance and persecution of dissident poets, writers, and political prisoners, and in efforts to repress the Vietnamese democracy movement, especially since the 2006 foundation of Bloc 8406. For example, lawyer and labor union activist Trần Quốc Hiền was sentenced in 2007 to five years imprisonment for "endangering state security", membership in Bloc 8406, and writing online articles titled, "The Tail", which critically described life under MPS surveillance.
