= Lương Tam Quang =

Vietnamese politician and police officer

General; Lương Tam Quang
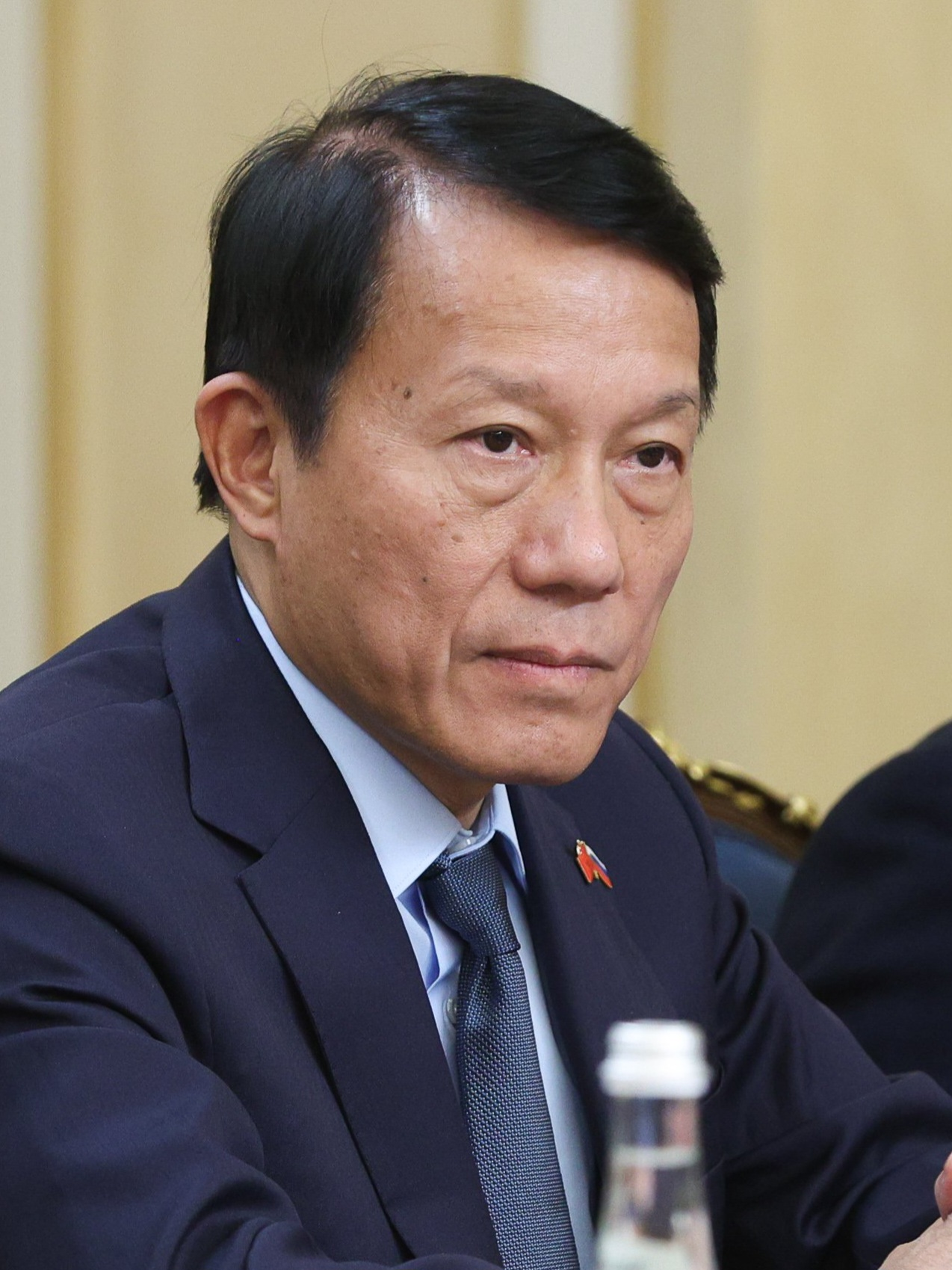
- Quang in 2025

Minister of Public Security
- Incumbent
- Assumed office 6 June 2024
- Prime Minister: Phạm Minh Chính; Lê Minh Hưng
- Preceded by: Tô Lâm

Secretary of the Central Police Party Committee
- Incumbent
- Assumed office 11 June 2024
- Preceded by: Tô Lâm

Deputy Minister of Public Security
- In office 15 August 2019 – 6 June 2024
- Minister: Tô Lâm
- Preceded by: Bùi Văn Nam
- Succeeded by: Phạm Thế Tùng

Personal details
- Born: 17 October 1964 (age 61) Kim Động district, Hung Yen, North Vietnam
- Party: Communist Party
- Education: Vietnam People's Security Academy; Ho Chi Minh National Academy of Politics
- Awards: Military Exploit Order

Military service
- Allegiance: Vietnam
- Branch/service: Vietnam People's Public Security
- Years of service: 1982–present
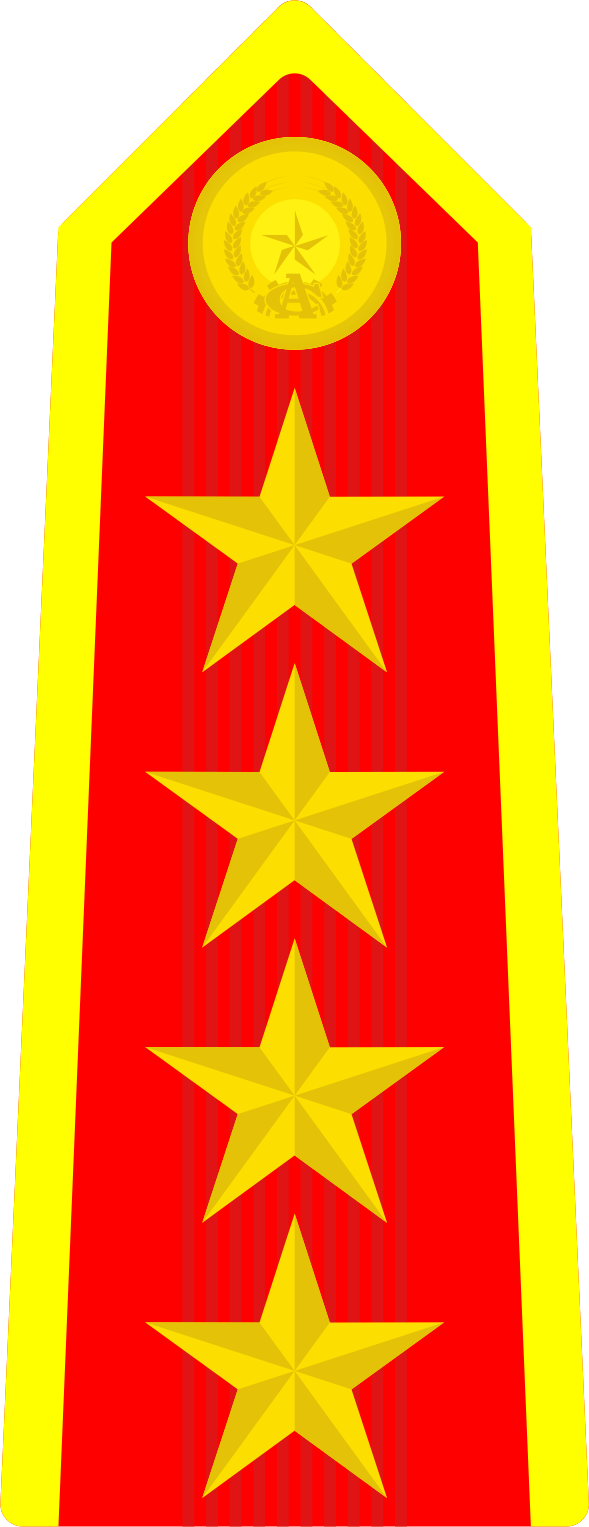
- Rank: Police General

Lương Tam Quang (Vietnamese pronunciation: [lɨəŋ˧˧ taːm˧˧ kwaːŋ˧˧]; born 17 October 1964) is a Vietnamese politician and police officer who has served as the Minister of Public Security since 6 June 2024 and as a member of the Politburo since 16 August 2024.

== Childhood ==
Lương Tam Quang was born on October 17, 1964 in Hiệp Cường commune, Kim Động district, Hưng Yên province.

== Early career ==
He began his career in the security sector, holding positions such as head of the Economic Security Department and deputy director of General Economic Security.

He later served as an assistant to the deputy minister of public security, the ministry’s deputy chief of staff, and its chief of staff cum spokesperson. In 2019, he was appointed deputy minister of public security and head of the Security Investigation Agency within the ministry. In January 2022, he was promoted to the rank of colonel general. In January 2021, he was elected to the 13th Central Committee of the Communist Party.
