= Tô Lâm =

General secretary of the Communist Party of Vietnam since 2024

His Excellency General Tô Lâm
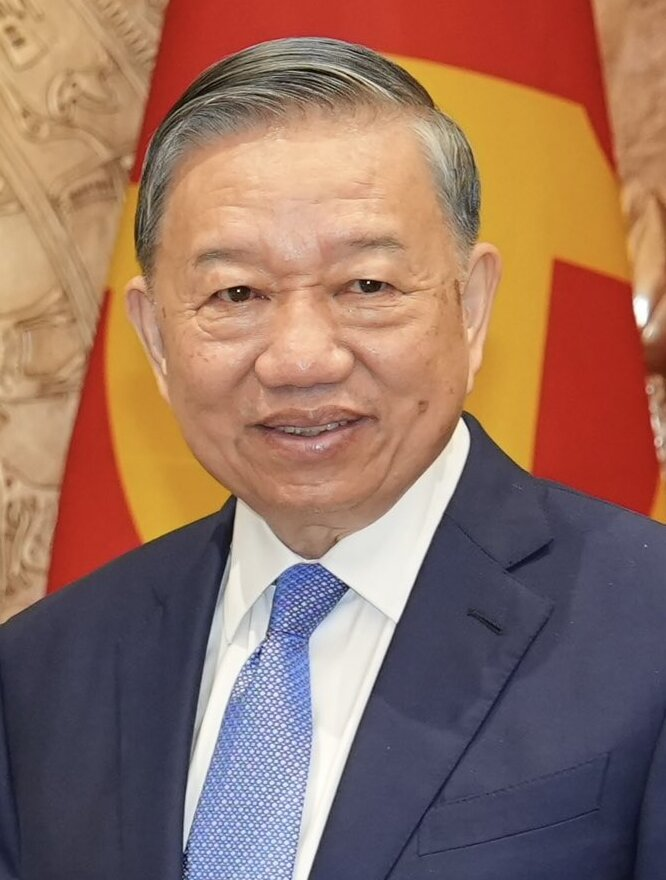
- Lâm in 2026

General Secretary of the Communist Party of Vietnam
- Incumbent
- Assumed office 3 August 2024 (Note: Acting: 18 July – 3 August 2024)
- Preceded by: Nguyễn Phú Trọng

Secretary of the Central Military Commission of the Communist Party
- Incumbent
- Assumed office 3 August 2024
- Deputy: Phan Văn Giang
- Preceded by: Nguyễn Phú Trọng

13th & 15th President of Vietnam
- Incumbent
- Assumed office 7 April 2026
- Prime Minister: Lê Minh Hưng
- Vice President: Võ Thị Ánh Xuân
- Preceded by: Lương Cường
- In office 23 May 2024 – 21 October 2024
- Prime Minister: Phạm Minh Chính
- Vice President: Võ Thị Ánh Xuân
- Preceded by: Võ Văn Thưởng
- Succeeded by: Lương Cường
Additional positions
Minister of Public Security
In office 9 April 2016 – 22 May 2024
Prime Minister	Nguyễn Xuân Phúc; Phạm Minh Chính
Preceded by	Trần Đại Quang
Succeeded by	Lương Tam Quang
Secretary of the Central Police Party Committee
In office 4 May 2016 – 6 June 2024
Preceded by	Trần Đại Quang
Succeeded by	Lương Tam Quang
President of the Vietnam Red Cross Society
Incumbent
Assumed office 22 May 2024
Preceded by	Võ Văn Thưởng
Head of Central Highlands Steering Committee
In office 31 July 2016 – 11 October 2017
Preceded by	Trần Đại Quang
Succeeded by	Position abolished
Deputy Minister of Public Security
In office 12 August 2010 – 7 April 2016
Minister	Lê Hồng Anh; Trần Đại Quang

Personal details
- Born: 10 July 1957 (age 69) Văn Giang, Hưng Yên, North Vietnam
- Party: Communist Party of Vietnam
- Spouse: Ngô Phương Ly
- Children: 4
- Parents: Tô Quyền (father); Đặng Thị Cam (mother)
- Education: Vietnam People's Security Academy; Ho Chi Minh National Academy of Politics
- Awards: Military Exploit Order

Military service
- Branch/service: Vietnam People's Public Security
- Years of service: 1974–2024
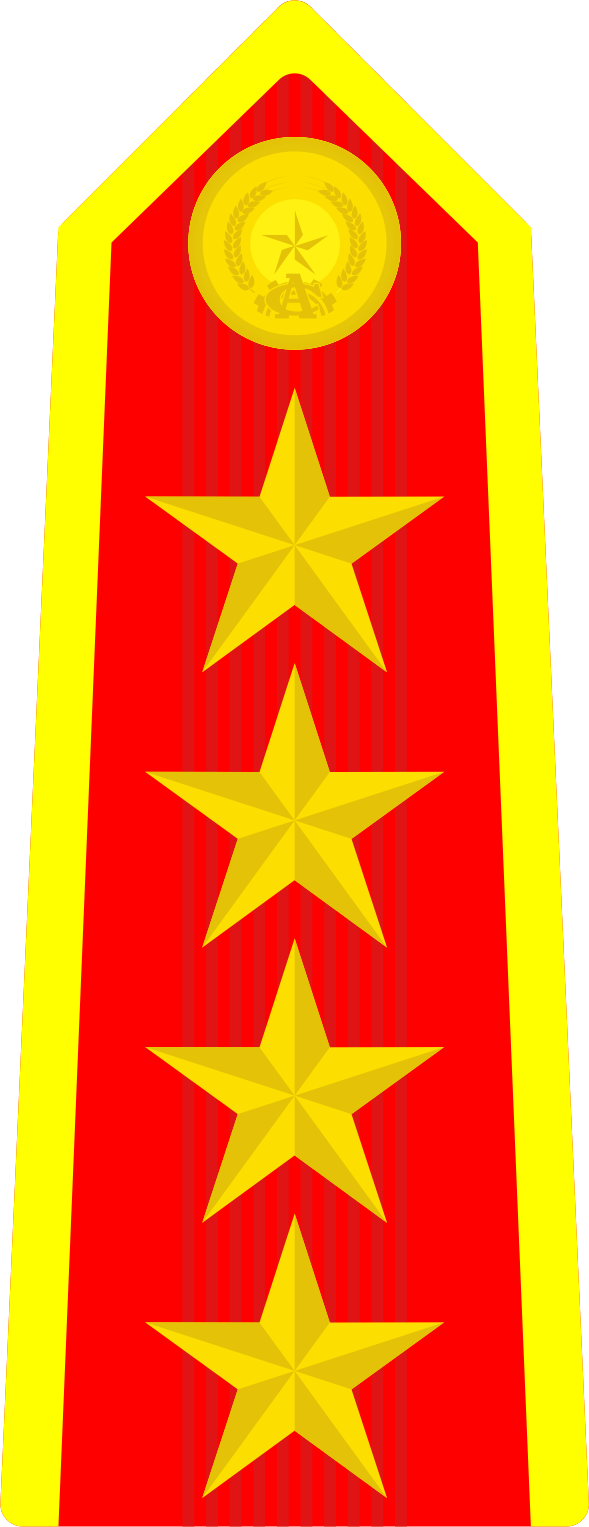
- Rank: Police general
- De facto Leader of the Socialist Republic of Vietnam: ← Nguyễn Phú Trọng (2024); (Current holder)

Tô Lâm (Vietnamese: [tō lʌ̄m]; born 10 July 1957) is a Vietnamese politician and former police officer who since 2024 has served as the general secretary of the Communist Party of Vietnam (CPV), the highest-ranked position of the Vietnamese politics, and as the current President of Vietnam since 2026. He previously served as president from May to October 2024. A veteran of the People's Public Security Forces with over 40 years of service, Lâm rose through the ranks to become Minister of Public Security in 2016, a position he held until his first election to the presidency in 2024.

Lâm became a member of the CPV on 22 August 1981. A graduate of the Central Police School and the Vietnam People's Security Academy, he spent his entire career in the police force. He holds the rank of four-star General in the Vietnam People's Public Security. He previously served as Head of the Central Highlands Steering Committee, Deputy Minister of Public Security, and Director-General of the MPS First General Department of Security. He has been a member of the CPV Central Committee since 2011 and a member of the CPV Politburo since 2016.

Lâm participated in the 2016 anti-corruption campaign launched by his predecessor, General Secretary Nguyễn Phú Trọng, which implicated some officials to a degree unprecedented in Vietnamese political history. Since Trọng's death in July 2024, Lâm has run the Central Steering Committee on Anti-corruption and the Central Military Commission. Lâm is alleged to have led a campaign against dissidents, suppressed civil society organizations, and tightened internet censorship. Since beginning his tenure as general secretary, Lâm has pursued administrative and bureaucratic restructuring.

On 18 May 2024, he was nominated by the CPV Central Committee to become Vietnam's 13th president, succeeding Võ Văn Thưởng, who resigned in March 2024 due to the anti-corruption campaign. The National Assembly relieved Lâm of his ministerial post before the presidential election, and his protégé Lương Tam Quang was appointed public security minister in June 2024. On 3 August 2024, following the death of Nguyễn Phú Trọng, Lâm was elected CPV General Secretary and Secretary of the Central Military Commission by the 13th Central Committee. As a result, he resigned the presidency and was replaced by Lương Cường, who would become the last of four presidents for the 2021–2026 term.

On 23 January 2026, Lâm was reelected General Secretary by the 14th National Congress of the Communist Party of Vietnam. On 7 April 2026, he was elected to a full term as president. Since then he is considered to be the supreme leader of Vietnam, due the fact that he holds both the first-ranked position (General Secretary of the CPV) and second-ranked position (President).

== Early life and education ==
Tô Lâm was born on 10 July 1957 in Xuân Cầu village, Văn Giang district, Hưng Yên province, northern Vietnam. He is the eldest son of Colonel Tô Quyền, former Director of Police for Hải Hưng province. According to his official biography, Lâm was born into a family of revolutionary activists and was exposed to the country's political struggle from a young age. His father, Tô Quyền, a recipient of the Hero of the People's Armed Forces title, participated in the communist revolution and served in security at the Party's Central Office for South Vietnam from 1966 until the end of the Vietnam War in 1975.

Following in his father's footsteps, Lâm studied defense, and law. In October 1974, he was a student of the sixth cohort of the Central Public Security School, later renamed People's Security University, now People's Security Academy. After that, he studied and researched the field of law, receiving a PhD in Jurisprudence. On 22 October 2015, he was awarded the academic title Professor of Security Sciences. Lâm was admitted to the Communist Party of Vietnam on 22 August 1981, becoming a full member of the party on 22 August 1982. During his Party and State activities, he studied a course at the Ho Chi Minh National Academy of Politics, receiving an Advanced degree in political theory.

== Early career ==
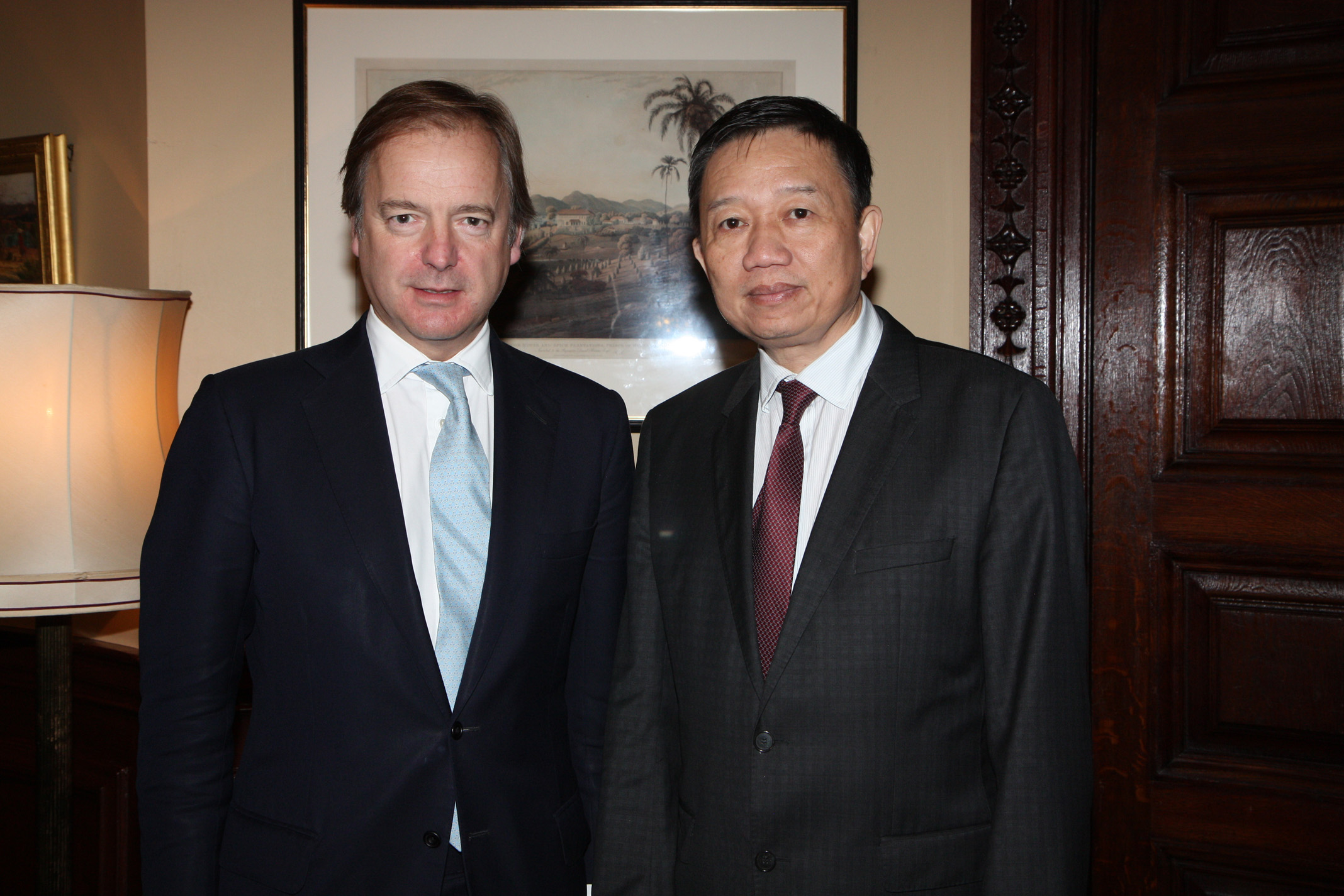
Hugo Swire and Tô Lâm in 2012

Tô Lâm's career in public security began with his education at the Central Police School in 1974, followed by his studies at the Vietnam People's Security Academy (VPSA) from October 1974 to October 1979. After graduating with a degree in security, he joined the Vietnam People's Public Security. Between 1979 and 1993, he served in the Political Protection Department I, eventually rising to the position of Deputy Chief in December 1988.

From 1993 to 2006, Tô Lâm's career advanced as he became the deputy director and later the Director of various departments within the Ministry of Public Security, including the Political Protection Department I and III. In 2006, he was appointed deputy director of the General Security Department, and by 2007, he had risen to the rank of Major-General. His leadership continued as he became the Director of the General Security Department I in 2009, and in July 2010, he was promoted to Lieutenant-General.

Tô Lâm's influence grew as he was appointed Deputy Minister of Public Security in August 2010 and became a member of the Party Central Committee during the 11th National Congress of the Communist Party of Vietnam in January 2011. His role in international relations was highlighted in 2011 when he received US Ambassador Ted Osius in Hanoi to discuss strengthening the partnership between the two nations. According to Voice of America, the US Ambassador commented on him: "Lâm is also a tough character, but intelligent and interested in strengthening cooperation with the United States in a number of fields."

In June 2011, he was appointed Secretary of the Central Police Party Committee, and by September 2014, he was promoted to Colonel General by President Trương Tấn Sang. His career continued to ascend as he served as Deputy Minister of Public Security and was promoted to Senior Lieutenant-General/Colonel General in early 2016. In April 2016, he was appointed Vice Chairman of the Central Steering Committee on Anti-corruption by General Secretary Nguyễn Phú Trọng, and in July of the same year, he was named Head of the Central Highlands Steering Committee. From 2016 to 2024, he held several key positions, including Minister of Public Security and Vice Chairman of the Central Steering Committee on Anti-corruption. His contributions were further recognized in January 2019 when he was promoted to the rank of General by President Nguyễn Phú Trọng.

== Rise to power ==
=== Minister of Public Security ===
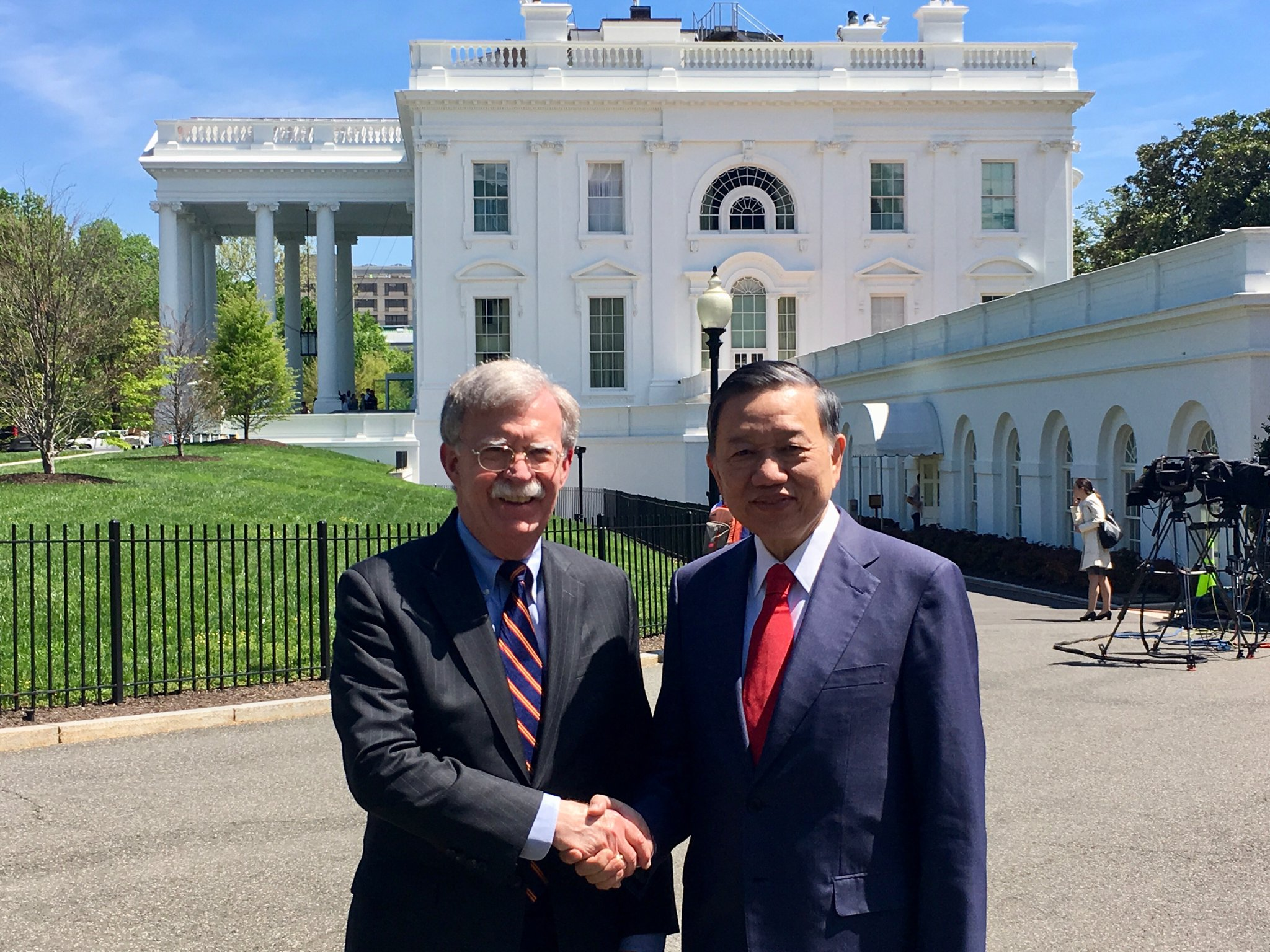
National Security Advisor John Bolton met then–Police General Tô Lâm at the White House in 2019.

In April 2016, the 13th National Assembly confirmed Lâm as Minister of Public Security. Shortly thereafter, the Politburo appointed him Secretary of the Central Public Security Party Committee. On 28 July 2016, at the first session of the 14th National Assembly, President Trần Đại Quang appointed him to the position of Minister of Public Security of the 14th Government of Vietnam, term 2016—2021. In this new term, he became the highest leader of the Vietnam People's Police, working under the Government led by Prime Minister Nguyễn Xuân Phúc. His mandate included overseeing national security, social order, counterintelligence, and criminal investigations.

On 27 April 2016, Lâm was appointed by the Politburo to concurrently hold the position of Deputy Head of the Central Steering Committee on Anti-corruption of the Communist Party of Vietnam, to participate in assisting and supporting the Head of the committee, General Secretary Nguyễn Phú Trọng, in anti-corruption work. On 30 July 2016, he was assigned by the Politburo to hold the position of Head of the Central Highlands Steering Committee of the Communist Party of Vietnam. On 11 October 2017, at the 6th Central Conference of the 12th term, the 11th Central Committee of the Communist Party of Vietnam agreed to end the activity of the Northwest, Central Highlands, and Southwest Steering Committees; he was relieved from this position.

On 29 January 2019, Lâm was promoted by General Secretary and President Nguyễn Phú Trọng from Senior General to Police General together with Army General Lương Cường, Director of the General Department of Politics of the Vietnam People's Army. On 30 January 2021, at the Central election, he was elected as an official member of the 13th Central Committee of the Communist Party of Vietnam. One day later, at the first session of the 13th Party Central Committee, he was elected a member of the 13th Politburo of the Communist Party of Vietnam.

Following the 13th National Congress in early 2021, Lâm retained his seats on both the Central Committee and the Politburo, and was subsequently re-appointed as Minister of Public Security for the 2021–2026 term. On 25 August 2021, Prime Minister Phạm Minh Chính signed Decision No. 1438/QD-TTg, appointing Lâm as a member of the National Steering Committee for COVID-19 epidemic prevention and control, Head of the Social Order and Security Subcommittee.

==== Major cases ====
In 2016, Trịnh Xuân Thanh; former member of the Communist Party of Vietnam, Vice Chairman of the People's Committee of Hậu Giang province and Delegates of the 14th National Assembly; was investigated and concluded that he had many shortcomings and serious violations during his time working at Petrovietnam Construction Joint Stock Corporation; being investigated by the Police Agency, the Ministry of Public Security issued a decision to prosecute the defendant for intentionally violating State regulations on economic management, causing serious consequences; At the same time, issued a temporary arrest warrant and a search warrant for Trịnh Xuân Thanh.

After determining that Trịnh Xuân Thanh had fled, the Ministry of Public Security issued a national and international arrest warrant for him. Minister Lâm directed the arrest of Trịnh Xuân Thanh and resolved this special criminal case. German investigators and Slovak police accused Lâm of directing the arrest of figures from Germany through international cooperation with Slovakia and Russia. According to German and Slovak authorities, the kidnapping of Thanh occurred during a trip of Lâm in July 2017, and this affected Vietnam's diplomatic relations with Germany and Slovakia. Thanh was eventually convicted of intentionally violating State regulations on economic management causing serious consequences and embezzlement of assets in 2018 and sentenced to life in prison.

High-level leadership case: since 2016, he has been assigned the position of Minister of Public Security and Deputy Head of the Central Anti-Corruption Commission, assistant to General Secretary Nguyễn Phú Trọng, Lâm has directed the police in investigating, handling, and prosecuting corruption and serious violations, including many large, national cases. We can mention the case of Đinh La Thăng: prosecution, trial, and sentence of 30 years in prison for former Politburo member, Secretary of the Ho Chi Minh City Party Committee, Đinh La Thăng due to economic management violations while holding the position of Chairman of Vietnam Oil and Gas Group;

The case of the former Minister of Information and Communications, Nguyễn Bắc Son and Trương Minh Tuấn on charges of violating management regulations, using public investment capital causing serious consequences and accepting bribes, sentenced to life imprisonment and 14 years in prison respectively; The case of former Chairman of Hanoi People's Committee, Nguyễn Đức Chung being arrested and investigated for appropriating secret State documents. In 2022, he and the Ministry of Public Security investigated into two major scandals related to the case of repatriation flights to "rescue" citizens returning to the country due to the COVID-19 pandemic, and the scandal at the Việt Á company caused many officials to be investigated and imprisoned. The attack on two Commune People's Committee headquarters in Đắk Lắk 2023: At a discussion in the National Assembly on 20 June, Lâm commented: The incident in Dak Lak shows that security cannot be overlooked at the base.

==== Foreign affairs ====
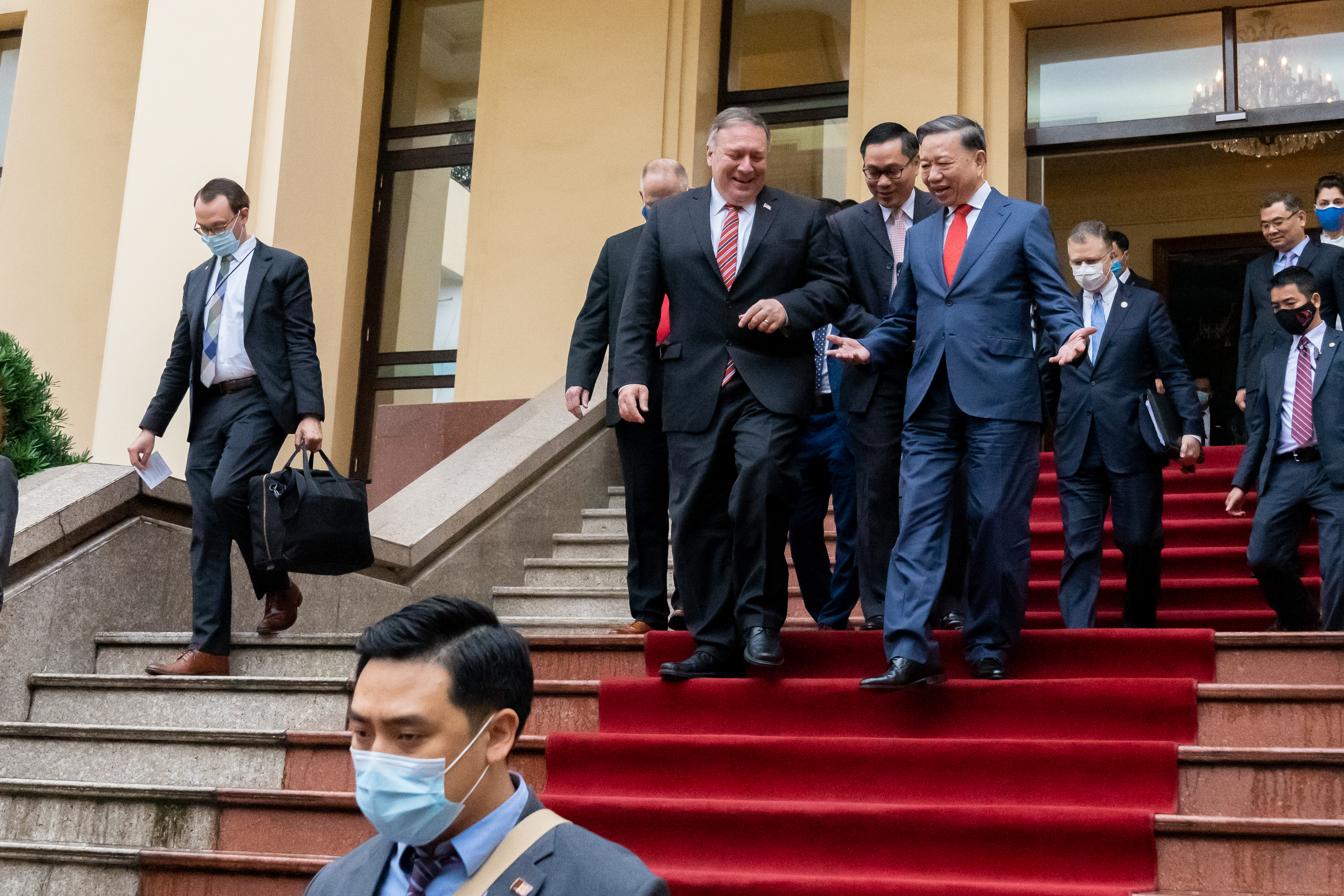
Police General Tô Lâm welcomed US Secretary of State Mike Pompeo in Hanoi in 2020.

During his 2016–2024 term, Police General Lâm represented the Vietnam People's Public Security Force, welcoming international representatives visiting Vietnam, conducting tours to partner countries, strengthening international relations, promoting integration in the new period and ensuring sovereignty and the country's security. In 2016, Lâm welcomed the Chinese delegation of State Councillor and Public Security minister Guo Shengkun in his Hanoi visit. The cabinet organized conferences to strengthen cooperation in fighting crime between the countries. In 2017, he and his delegation visited Slovakia, met with Prime Minister Robert Fico; together with Deputy Prime Minister and Minister of Internal Affairs of Slovakia Robert Kaliňák, signed the Cooperation Agreement Between the Ministry of Public Security of Vietnam and the Ministry of Internal Affairs of Slovakia on the Fight Against Crime.

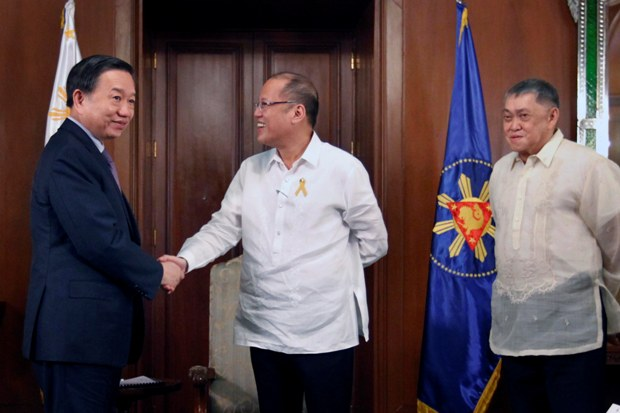
President of the Philippines Benigno Aquino III welcomed Minister Tô Lâm at Malacañang Palace in 2016.

In 2018, Lâm visited and worked in the United Kingdom, together with the Home Secretary Sajid Javid, signed and handed over the 'Memorandum of Understanding between the Government and the United Kingdom'. Government of the Socialist Republic of Vietnam and the Government of the United Kingdom of Great Britain and Northern Ireland on cooperation in preventing and combating human trafficking.

In 2019, Lâm and his delegation visited South Korea, met with Prime Minister Lee Nak-yon, and Prosecutor General Moon Moo-il, strengthening cooperation between the two countries. In 2020, he visited Southeast Asian countries such as Laos, met with Lao Prime Minister Thongloun Sisoulith and Lao Minister of Security Vilay Lakhamphong signed the Plan to implement the Cooperation Agreement between the two ministries; Brunei, to exchange and increase information sharing on traditional and non-traditional crime and security situations, including methods, tricks and the connection of types of crimes that affect the two countries. At the end of 2020, Lâm had a meeting and worked with the US high-level delegation led by Secretary of State Mike Pompeo within the framework of the official visit on the occasion of the 25th anniversary of establishing diplomatic relations between Vietnam and the United States.

From 9 to 10 April 2023, Lâm had a trip to India. During the meeting with Indian National Security Advisor Ajit Kumar Doval, the two sides committed to further deepening the Vietnam-India Comprehensive Strategic Partnership, especially in issues such as security and defense, contributing to maintaining peace, prosperity and stability of the two countries, the region and the world. From 19 to 22 May 2023, he paid a visit to Iran at the invitation of Iranian Minister of Interior Ahmad Vahidi. They agreed to promote cooperation between the two Ministries in the field of security and order, coordinate in handling transnational crimes and crimes related to citizens of the two countries, and absolutely protect the safety of flights. Visits by senior leaders ensure security and safety for the headquarters of representative agencies and citizens of this country working, studying, sightseeing, traveling, and investment cooperation in the country's territory that strengthen cooperation on cybersecurity, promote cooperation in the field of training, improve professional capacity and foreign languages, and support each other on international forums of which the two sides are members.

Lâm held talks with Iranian Justice Minister Amin Houssein Rahimi. After the talks, authorized by President Võ Văn Thưởng, Lâm signed an Extradition Agreement and an Agreement on the Transfer of Prisoners between the Socialist Republic of Vietnam and the Islamic Republic with Iranian Justice Minister A.H. Rahimi. He also worked with Commander-in-Chief of the National Police Ahmad-Reza Radan to identify specific cooperation activities in the field of crime prevention, especially organized crime and transnational drug and high-tech crimes. He also met with the First Vice President of Iran, Mohammad Mokhber.

==== Gold steak controversy ====
In early November 2021, a video was posted on the TikTok account of the chef Salt Bae (Nusret Gökçe). The clip, which was later removed, showed Lâm dining at Salt Bae's expensive restaurant in London, reportedly during his trip to the 2021 United Nations Climate Change Conference. In the video, chef Gökçe is seen feeding Lâm a piece of gold-coated beef. It is unclear who paid for the meal, but according to international newspapers, the event sparked outrage among many Vietnamese netizens. They considered it a lavish meal, with the price of the gold-coated beef dish exceeding the minister's monthly salary, especially as Vietnam was suffering heavily from the COVID-19 pandemic, with millions of people facing difficulties. The news of a communist official dining at a luxurious restaurant was reported by various media outlets in several countries, with some sources highlighting the contrast between this and his previous act of laying flowers at Karl Marx's grave.

Despite attracting significant international media attention, the Vietnamese press remained silent on the matter. On social media, the hashtag "#saltbae" was blocked worldwide for a few days and was only accessible again on 9 November. Facebook did not provide a reason for the block and did not clarify whether the Vietnamese government requested the removal of the video content. Additionally, on 16 November 2021, Bùi Tuấn Lâm, 39, a noodle vendor in Đà Nẵng, was reportedly targeted by police after posting a video on his Facebook page in which he imitated Gökce's gesture. On 7 September 2022, Bùi Tuấn Lâm was arrested by multiple plainclothes police officers at his noodle stand. After a trial only lasting a day, Lam was sentenced to five-and-a half years in prison and four years of probation upon being released.

According to The Diplomat, despite the "gold steak" scandal, Lâm survived the Blazing Furnace anti-corruption campaign initiated by General Secretary Trọng. This was largely because, as police chief, Lâm himself led much of the purge, exercising control over Vietnam's security apparatus and access to intelligence information, which enabled him to eliminate rivals and later become the country's most powerful leader.

== Leadership (2024–present) ==
=== First presidency (May – October 2024) ===
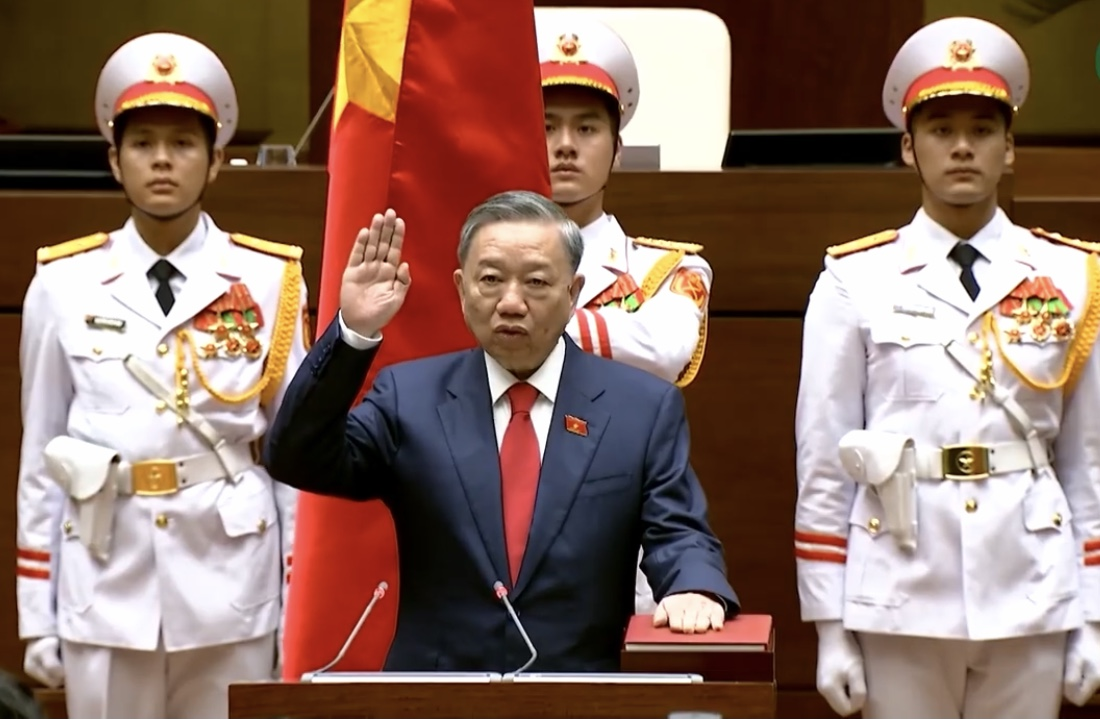
Lâm being sworn in as the 13th president of Vietnam on 22 May 2024

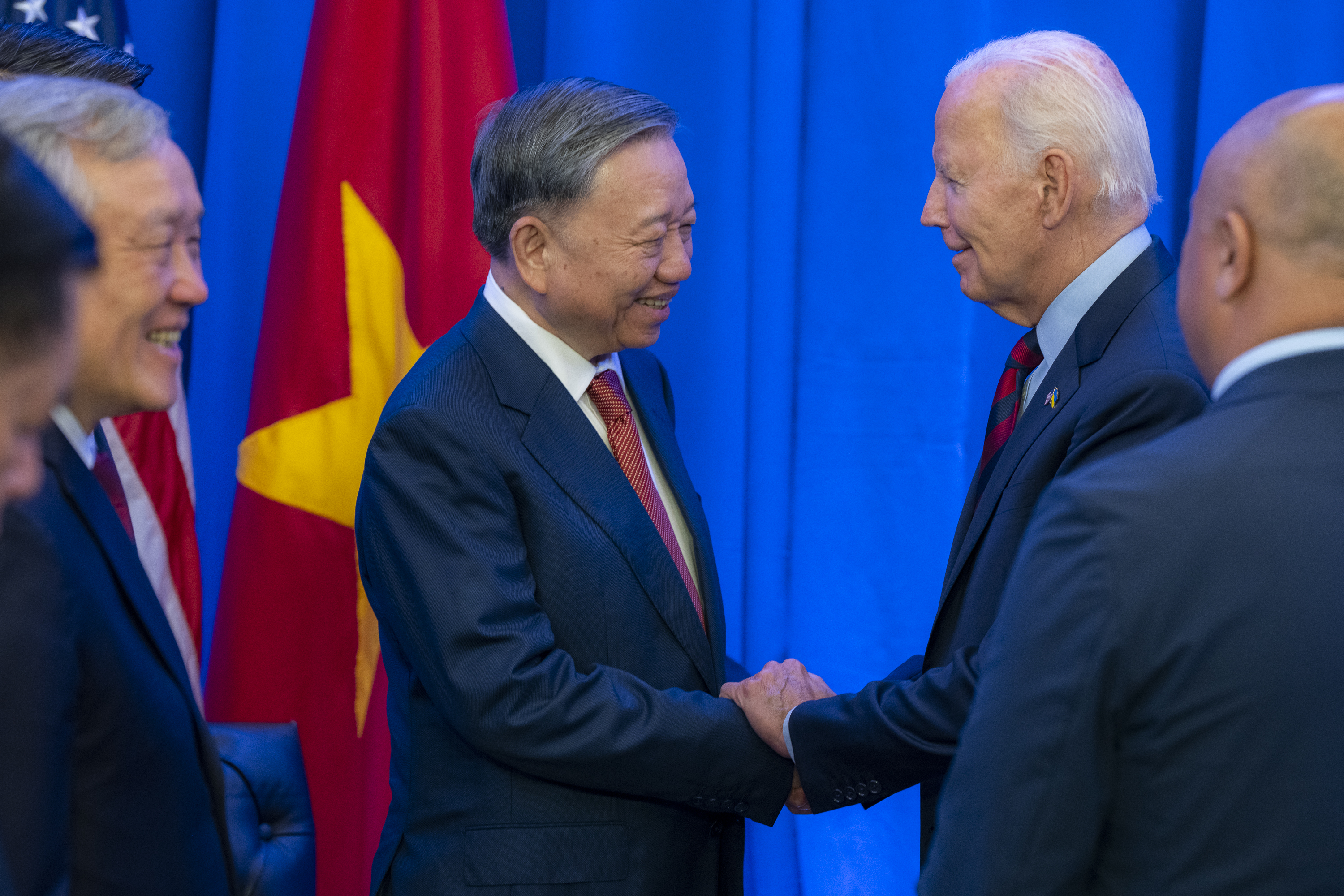
Tô Lâm sees then-U.S. president Joe Biden in September 2024.

On 21 March 2024, Võ Văn Thưởng submitted his resignation from the presidency after his former subordinates were imprisoned for corruption in the Phúc Sơn Group misconduct case. Following this, Vice President Võ Thị Ánh Xuân temporarily served as acting president, a role she had previously held for almost two months in early 2023. At the 9th Central Committee Conference on 18 May 2024, Lâm was nominated to become Vietnam's next President and was confirmed by the National Assembly at the opening of its 7th Session. He retained his current post of Minister of Public Security alongside the presidency until the Central Committee nominates a successor. On 22 May 2024, the National Assembly elected Lâm as president. He served in what the shortest tenure as Vietnamese president until his replacement by Lương Cường on 21 October.

=== General Secretaryship (2024–present) ===
On 18 July 2024, Lâm was appointed caretaker General Secretary of the Communist Party of Vietnam, the most powerful position in Vietnam, after Nguyễn Phú Trọng fell ill. Following the latter's death the next day, Lâm was officially elected as the party's general secretary on 3 August. Shifting away from the Party's previous practice of collective leadership, Lâm's tenure as General Secretary has been marked by an increased concentration of decision-making power.

On 23 January 2026, Lâm was unanimously re-elected as General Secretary by the 14th National Party Congress. On 7 April 2026, he was elected to a full term as president.

==== Administrative reforms ====
Beginning on 5 November 2024, state media began announcing major structural reforms of the bureaucracy. On that date, the Communist Review, an official publication of the Communist Party of Vietnam, published an article titled Tinh – Gọn – Mạnh – Hiệu năng – Hiệu lực – Hiệu quả (roughly translated as Sharp, compact, strong ; High-performance, effective, efficient) credited to General Secretary Tô Lâm, in which he proclaimed the general strategic direction of the upcoming reforms.

The reform and streamlining of the administrative apparatus, founded on Resolution No. 18-NQ/TW of 2017, has been implemented, but on a small scale and without decisive action. In fact, during the period 2016–2020, many issues such as the merger of provinces, districts, and communes, or the consolidation of mass organizations into the Fatherland Front, were discussed numerous times in various agencies, but implementation progress was very slow or not implemented at all. However, during this period, while Lâm was still Minister of Public Security, a major streamlining operation took place within the Ministry of Public Security, with the agency streamlining 6 general departments, nearly 60 departmental-level units, and nearly 300 divisional-level units. This was considered by the government as "important experience" in organizational restructuring.

Just a few days after his article, the Steering Committee for the implementation of Resolution 18-NQ/TW on streamlining and improving the efficiency of the apparatus was established. After a short period, by February and March 2025, the streamlining of many Party, National Assembly, and Government agencies was basically completed, with many agencies dissolved, merged, and many functions and tasks transferred between agencies to avoid overlapping professional functions; at the same time, localities also implemented similar streamlining of the apparatus to ensure uniformity in management and operation. Except for the Ministry of National Defence, all General Departments in all ministries and agencies were simultaneously downgraded to the level of Departments, leading to many changes in the management apparatus from the central to local levels in many sectors such as Taxation, Customs, Statistics, etc.

On 28 February 2025, just days after completing the streamlining of agencies, the Politburo and the Secretariat of the Central Committee, headed by Tô Lâm, issued Conclusion 127-KL/TW. The fundamental content of this conclusion included studying the merger of many provinces and cities, abolishing the district level, streamlining the apparatus in mass organizations, building a system of courts and procuratorates without district levels (similar to the police system when district-level police were abolished nationwide on March 1 according to Conclusion 121-KL/TW), and streamlining the military apparatus. To implement these contents, Conclusion 127 even directed a review, amendment, and supplementation of Party regulations, the Constitution of the Socialist Republic of Vietnam, and State laws, as well as temporarily suspending the organization of Party congresses at the commune and district levels nationwide.

==== Development of science and technology ====
On 22 December 2024, Lâm signed and promulgated Resolution No. 57-NQ/TW of the Politburo on breakthroughs in the development of science, technology, innovation, and national digital transformation. On January 13, 2025, the National Conference on Breakthroughs in Science, Technology, Innovation, and Digital Transformation was solemnly held in Hanoi. This conference announced the establishment of the Central Steering Committee on Science, Technology, Innovation, and Digital Transformation, directly under the Politburo, chaired by him.

==== Economic reforms ====
Since Lâm took office in mid-2024, the Vietnamese stock market has climbed nearly 40% in 2025, outpacing most other emerging markets despite headwinds from U.S. trade tariffs and frequent natural disasters. He has promised a "new growth model", led by Vietnam's conglomerates, that focuses on innovation and the digital economy, pivoting away from reliance on exports and cheap labour that have fuelled a decades-long economic boom, luring manufacturing investments from foreign multinationals such as Samsung, Apple, and Nike. While courting foreign capital and technology remains a priority, Lam says Vietnam must gradually move beyond cheap labour and prioritise technology transfer as a requirement for foreign investors, pledging annual growth of at least 10% for the rest of this decade. Growth accelerated to 8% in 2025 from 7% in 2024.

==== Foreign affairs ====
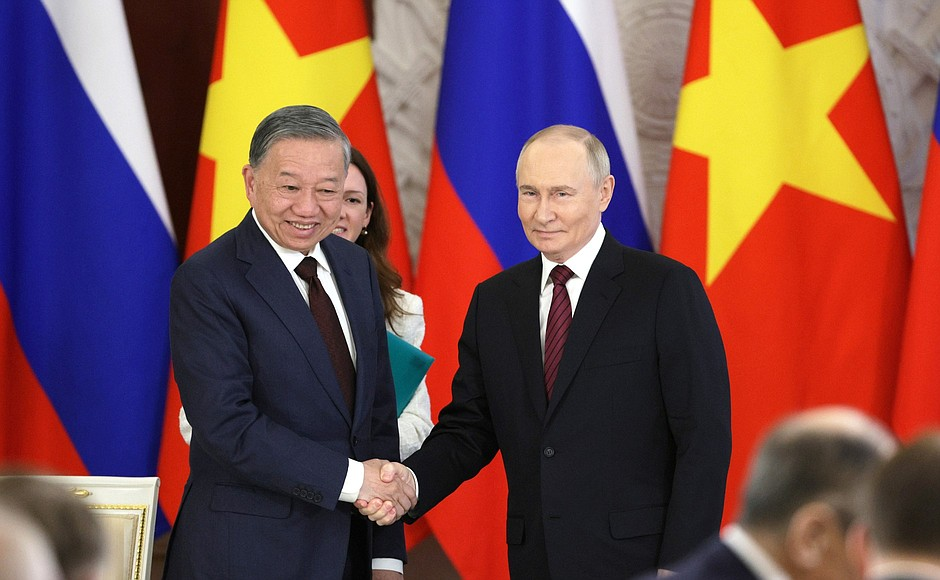
Tô Lâm and Russian president Vladimir Putin shook hands during their meeting in Moscow, 10 May 2025

On 19 June 2024, Russian President Vladimir Putin visited Vietnam and met with Lâm. Putin thanked Vietnam for its "balanced position" on the Russo-Ukrainian war. On 18 August 2024, Lâm arrived in China for a three-day visit, his first overseas visit since becoming president and general secretary. He first arrived in Guangzhou before heading to Beijing. Following his arrival in Beijing, he met with CCP General Secretary Xi Jinping. The two communist leaders held talks and signed cooperation documents. Afterwards, Xi congratulated Lâm on his election as general secretary and new leader.

Lâm began a two-day state visit to Ireland on 2 October 2024 by meeting President Michael D. Higgins and his wife, Sabina, at Áras an Uachtaráin, the presidential residence. The two leaders held wide-ranging talks during this first state visit to Ireland by a Vietnamese leader, reciprocating Higgins' inaugural visit by an Irish president to Vietnam in 2016. Lâm returned to the Áras for a state dinner in the evening along with members of the Irish Vietnamese community.

On 18 January 2026, in his capacity as General Secretary of the Communist Party of Vietnam, Tô Lâm accepted an invitation from the United States President Donald Trump to join the US-led Board of Peace as a founding member. On 19 February 2026, Tô Lâm attended the inaugural meeting of the Gaza Board of Peace in Washington D.C and had a formal in-person meeting with Trump at the White House. The two leaders held wide-ranging talks, in which Trump congratulated Lâm on his election and said he would work to remove Vietnam from being restricted in accessing U.S. advanced technology.

== Personal life ==
Lâm divorced his first wife in the 1990s and later remarried Ngô Phương Ly, a TV producer and painter from an artistic family. He had four children in total: a son, Tô Long, and a daughter with his first wife, and two daughters with his second wife.

== Honours ==
=== National orders ===
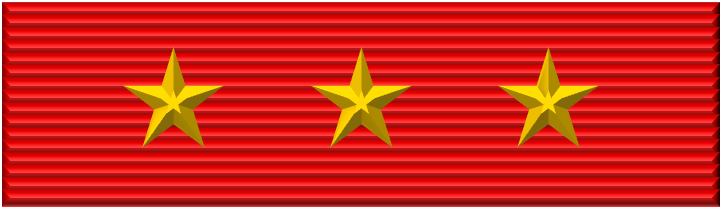
- Military Exploit Order (1st class), thrice
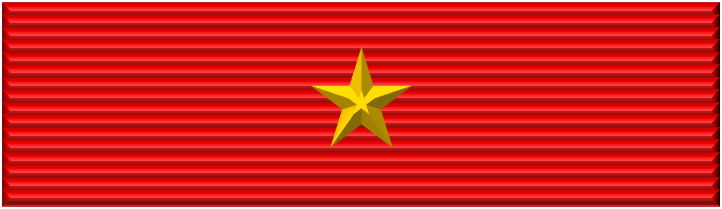
- Military Exploit Order (3rd class)
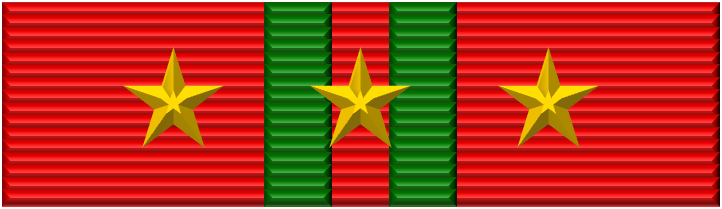
- Feat Order (1st class), twice
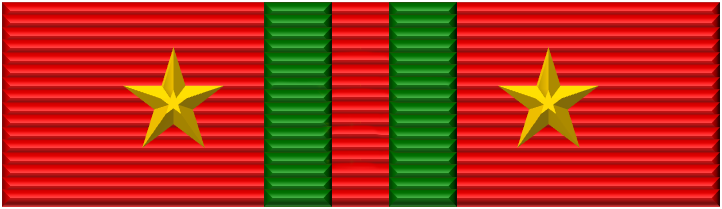
- Feat Order (2nd class)
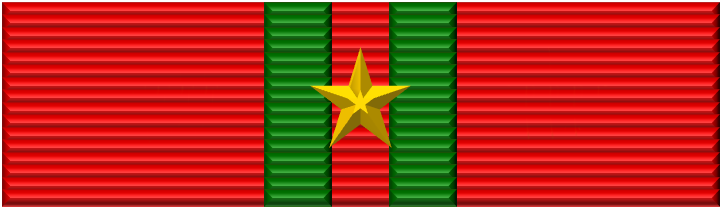
- Feat Order (3rd class)
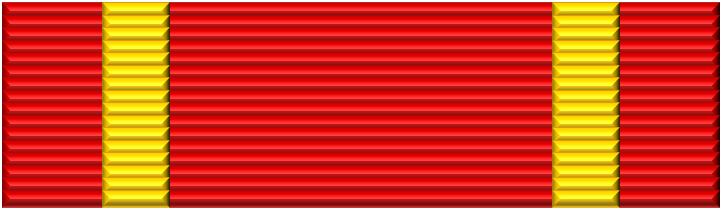
- Victory Banner Medal
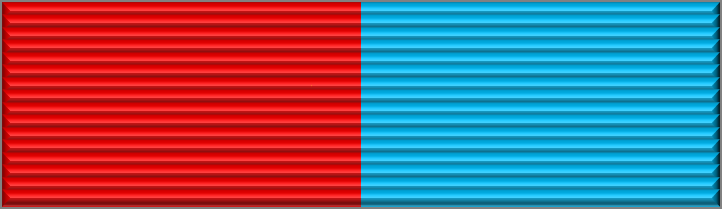
- Fatherland Protection Medal
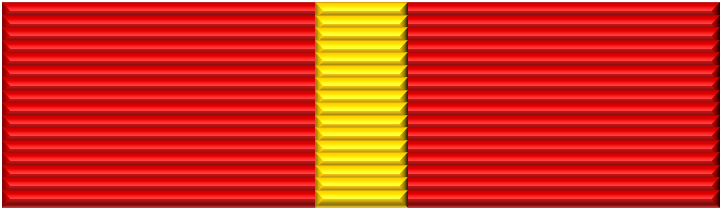
- Glorious Fighter Medal (1st class)
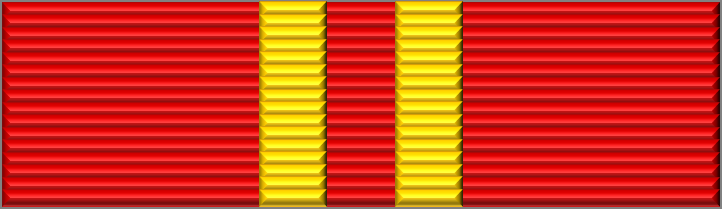
- Glorious Fighter Medal (2nd class)
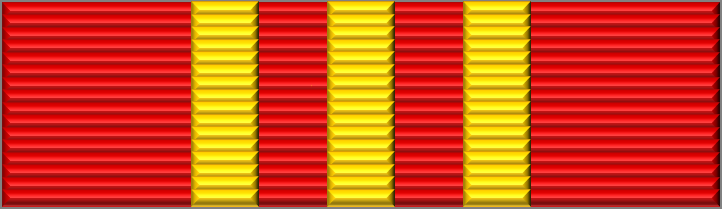
- Glorious Fighter Medal (3rd class)
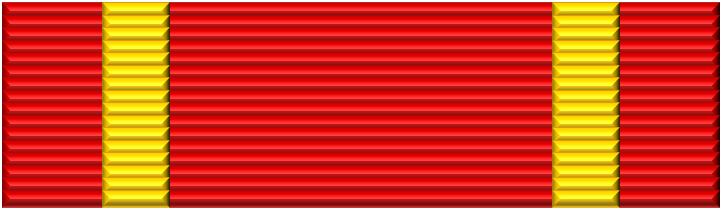
- Medal for National Security

=== Foreign orders ===
- Belarus:
  - Order of the Friendship of Peoples (2025)
- Cambodia:
  - Commander of the Royal Order of Sahametrei
- Cuba:
  - Order of José Martí (2024)
  - Order of 6 June (1st class)
- Denmark:
  - Knight of the Order of the Elephant (2026)
- France:
  - Grand Cross of the Order of the Legion of Honour (2026)
- Kazakhstan:
  - Order of Friendship (1st class) (2025)
- Laos:
  - National Gold Medal (2025)
  - Freedom Medal (1st and 2nd classes)
  - Labor Medal (1st and 2nd classes)
  - Friendship Medal
  - Hero Medal
- Russia:
  - Order of Friendship (2021)
  - Honorary Professor Russian Presidential Academy of National Economy and Public Administration (2025)

=== Awards ===
- Lev N. Tolstoy International Peace Prize (2026).

== Published works ==
- To Lam, Ho Chi Minh's Thought on the People's Public Security, National Political Publishing House, 2015.
- To Lam, Ho Chi Minh's ideology on cadres and cadre work of the People's Public Security, National Political Publishing House, 2017.
- To Lam, The masses - the decisive factor in winning the struggle to protect security and order, People's Public Security Publishing House, 2017.
- To Lam, Ho Chi Minh's Thought on the role of the people in the cause of protecting security and order, People's Public Security Publishing House, 2017.
- To Lam, Vietnam People's Police with Ho Chi Minh's works as a revolutionary policeman, Truth National Political Publishing House, 2018.

== Notes ==
Party political offices
Preceded by Nguyễn Phú Trọng	General Secretary of the Communist Party of Vietnam; 2024–present	Incumbent
Preceded by Nguyễn Phú Trọng	Secretary of the Central Military Commission of the Communist Party of Vietnam; 2024–present	Incumbent
Preceded by Nguyễn Phú Trọng	Chairman of the Central Steering Committee on Anti-corruption; 2024–present	Incumbent
Political offices
Preceded by Võ Văn Thưởng	President of Vietnam; 2024; 2026–present	Succeeded by Lương Cường
Preceded by Lương Cường	President of Vietnam; 2024; 2026–present	Incumbent
Government offices
Preceded by Trần Đại Quang	Minister of Public Security; 2016–2024	Succeeded by Lương Tam Quang
