= Lương Cường =

President of Vietnam from 2024 to 2026

His Excellency General Lương Cường
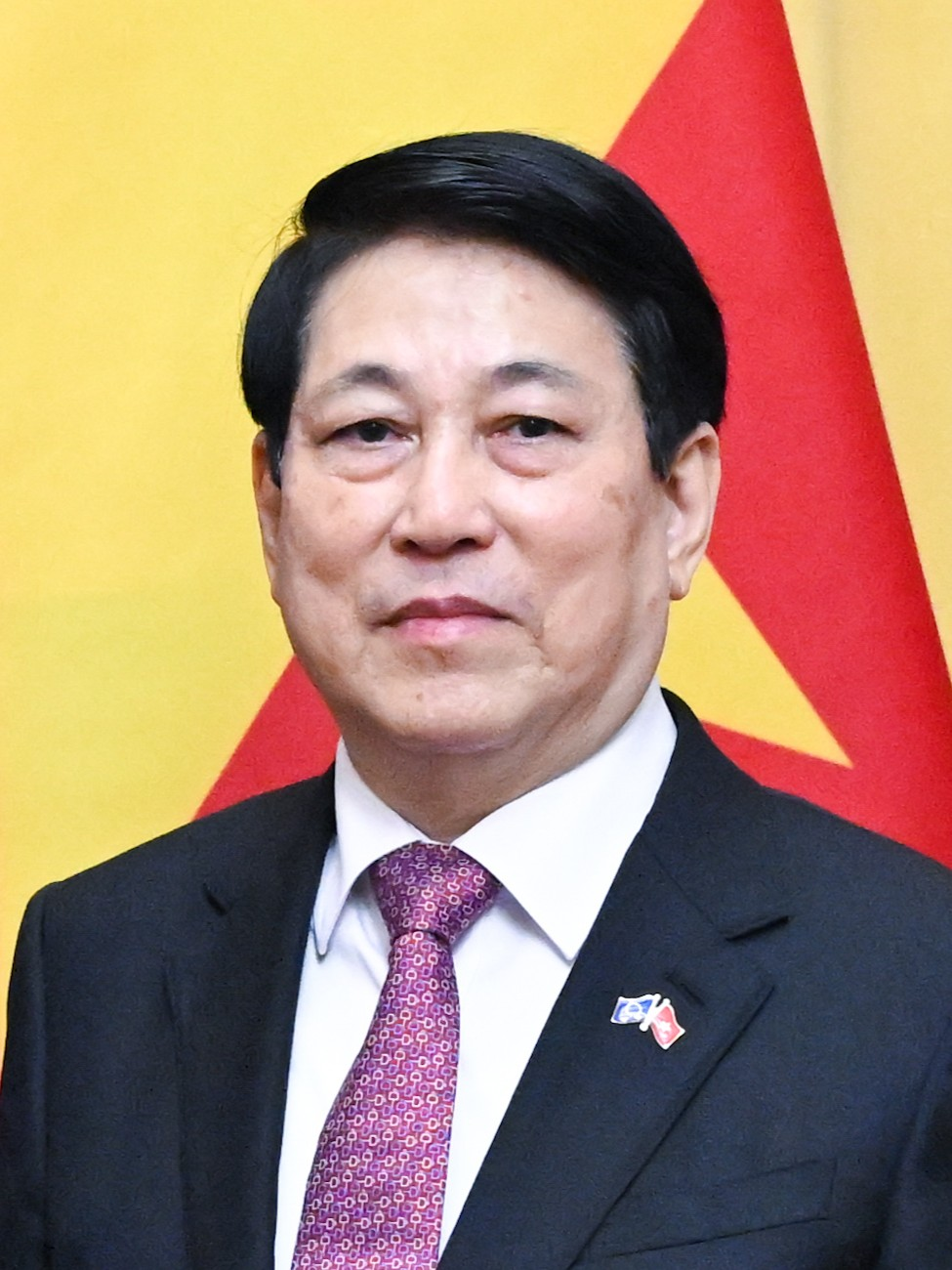
- Cường in 2026

14th President of Vietnam
- In office 21 October 2024 – 7 April 2026
- Prime Minister: Phạm Minh Chính
- Vice President: Võ Thị Ánh Xuân
- Preceded by: Tô Lâm
- Succeeded by: Tô Lâm

Permanent Member of the Secretariat
- In office 16 May 2024 – 23 October 2024
- General Secretary: Nguyễn Phú Trọng; Tô Lâm
- Preceded by: Trương Thị Mai
- Succeeded by: Trần Cẩm Tú

Director of the General Political Department of the Vietnam People's Army
- In office 15 April 2016 – 3 June 2024
- President: See list: Trần Đại Quang; Đặng Thị Ngọc Thịnh (acting); Nguyễn Phú Trọng; Nguyễn Xuân Phúc; Võ Thị Ánh Xuân (acting); Võ Văn Thưởng; Võ Thị Ánh Xuân (acting); Tô Lâm
- Preceded by: Ngô Xuân Lịch
- Succeeded by: Trịnh Văn Quyết

Personal details
- Born: Lương Văn Cường; 15 August 1957 (age 69) Việt Trì, Phú Thọ, North Vietnam
- Party: Communist Party of Vietnam
- Spouse: Nguyễn Thị Minh Nguyệt
- Children: 2

Military service
- Allegiance: Communist Party of Vietnam
- Branch/service: Vietnam People's Army
- Years of service: 1976–2024
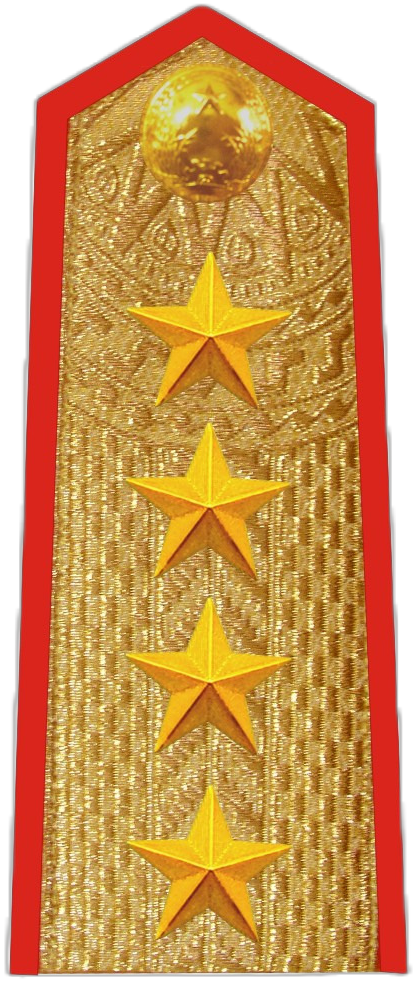
- Rank: Army general
- Commands: Vietnam People's Army
- Battles/wars: Cambodian-Vietnamese War; Sino-Vietnamese War

Lương Cường (Vietnamese pronunciation: [lɯɤŋ˧˧ kɯɤŋ˨˩]; born 15 August 1957) is a Vietnamese politician and former army general who served as the 14th president of Vietnam from October 2024 to April 2026. He also served as the permanent Member of the Secretariat since May 2024 to October 2024 and as director of the general department of politics of the People's Army of Vietnam from April 2016 to June 2024. As the country's head of state, Lương Cường was the second highest official in Vietnam after General Secretary Tô Lâm.

== Biography ==
He was born in Phú Thọ Province on 15 August 1957. He has a bachelor's degree in Party Building and State Administration, and a high level of political theory. During his work, he attended training courses for cadres at the Ho Chi Minh National Academy of Politics and in China.

=== Career ===
Cường joined the Vietnamese army at the age of 18 in 1976. He fought in the aftermath of the Vietnam War. He became a member of the Communist Party of Vietnam in August 1978.

In August 1978, he was admitted to the Communist Party of Vietnam at the age of 21.

He has been a member of the Politburo since 2021, and a member of the Central Committee since 2011.

On December 19, 2014, he was promoted from Lieutenant General to General by President Trương Tấn Sang. Cường was previously vice director of the People's Army of Vietnam General Political Department from 2011 to 2016 where he became the director, and was promoted to the rank of four-star General in 2019.

On 16 May 2024, Cường was assigned by the Politburo to assume the position of Permanent Member of the Secretariat, the fifth-highest ranking position in Vietnam's political system, following the resignation of Trương Thị Mai.

== Presidency (2024–2026) ==
On 26 August 2024, General Secretary Tô Lâm resigned from the presidency shortly after his election as the new general secretary earlier that month following Nguyễn Phú Trọng's death in July. On 21 October, at the eighth session of the 15th National Assembly, Cường was elected to the presidency with 440/440 attending National Assembly delegates in favor (reaching 91.67% of the total number of National Assembly delegates). He was subsequently inaugurated as president for the remainder of the 2021–2026 term, the fourth of this term.

In his inaugural speech, Cường declared his commitment to maintaining and enhancing high unity and solidarity within the Party; building a clean and strong Socialist rule-of-law state; strengthening national defense and security; and consistently pursuing an independent, self-reliant, peaceful, and friendly foreign policy. On the morning of 22 October 2024, the handover ceremony was held at the Presidential Palace. At the ceremony, Tô Lâm officially handed over the presidential duties to Cường and requested relevant agencies to report specific tasks, review work plans, and coordinate internal and external affairs with the new president. On 7 April 2026, his presidential term expired, and was succeeded by Tô Lâm, who was elected to a full term.

=== Foreign affairs ===
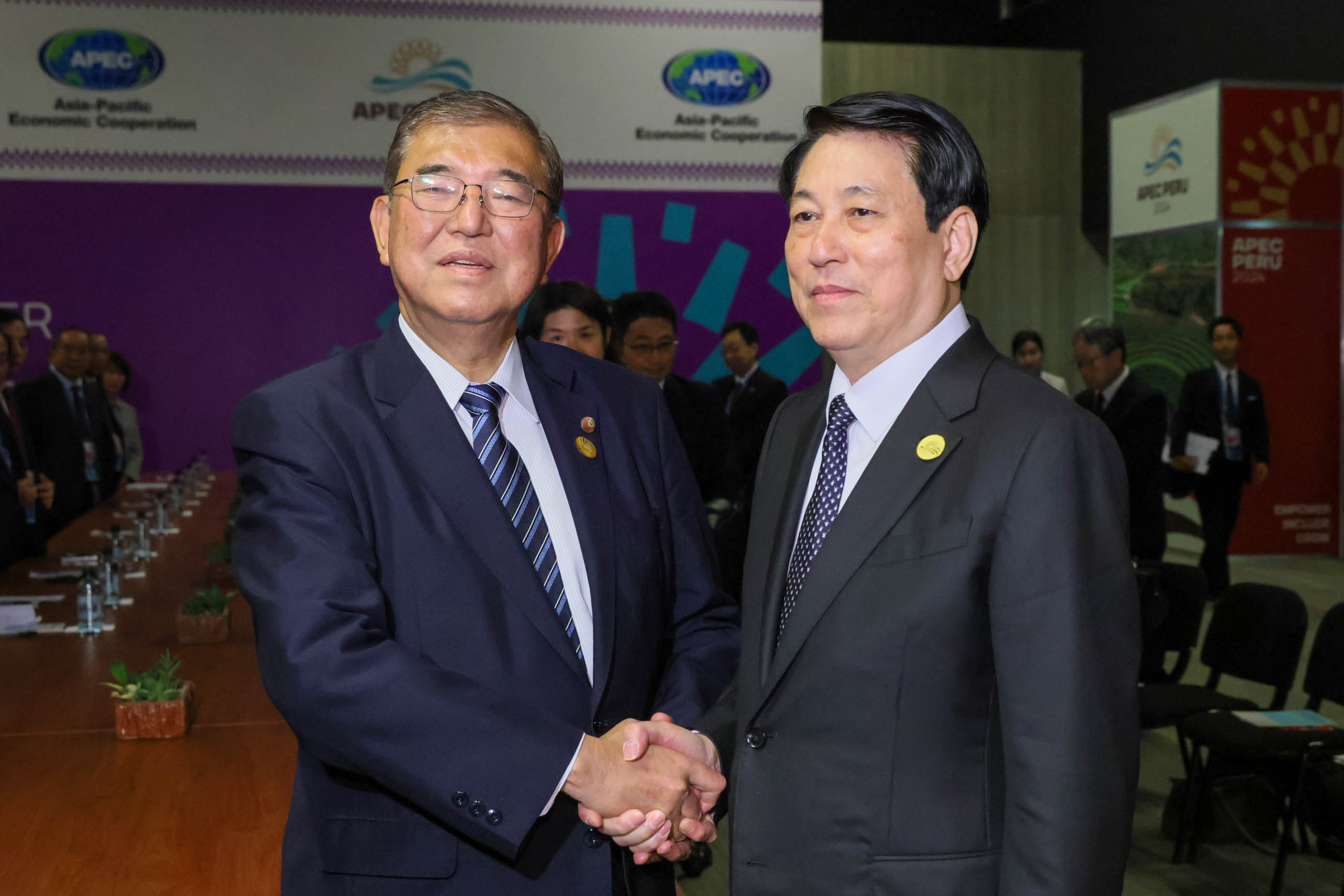
Cường with Japanese prime minister Shigeru Ishiba in the APEC Summit in Lima, Peru, 16 November 2024

On 10 November 2024, Cường began a three-day visit to Chile, his first overseas visit since becoming president. He arrived in Santiago to meet President Gabriel Boric. Before that, he visited the home of the late president Salvador Allende and met with members of Allende's family.

On 13 November, Cường arrived in Lima in Peru to participate in the APEC Summit. He was awarded the Order of the Sun of Peru by Peruvian president Dina Boluarte. He also met with many other world leaders during the summit.

== Rank ==
- Major General (2004)
- Lieutenant General (2009)
- Colonel General (2014)
- Army General (2019)

== Honours ==
=== National awards ===
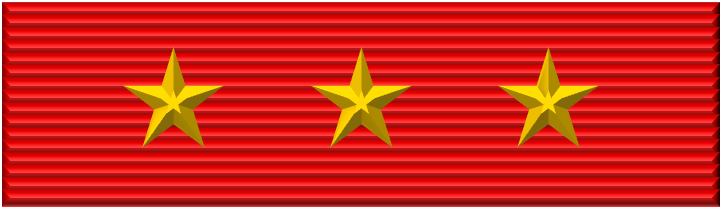
- Military Exploit Order (1st class)
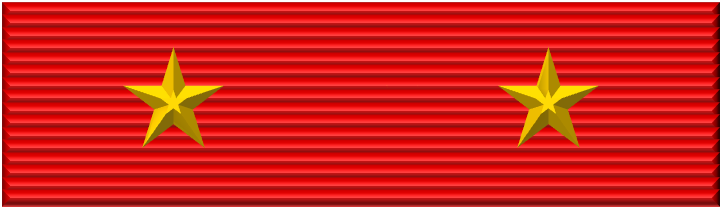
- Military Exploit Order (2nd class)
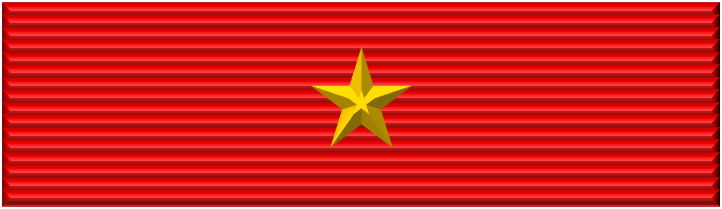
- Military Exploit Order (3rd class)
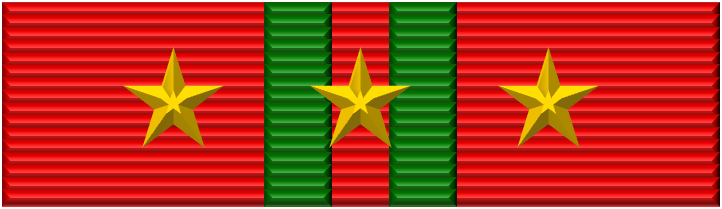
- Feat Order (1st class)
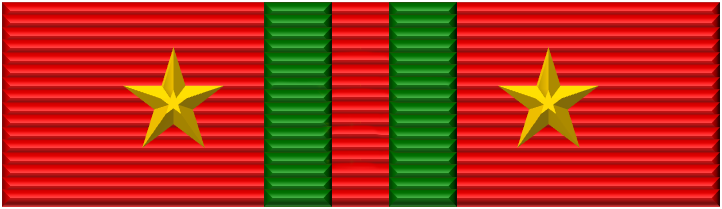
- Feat Order (2nd class)
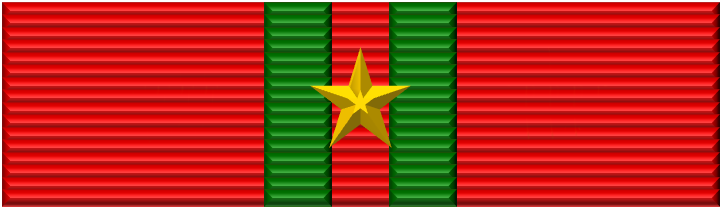
- Feat Order (3rd class)
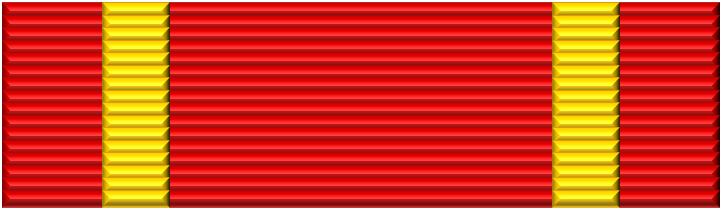
- Victory Banner Medal
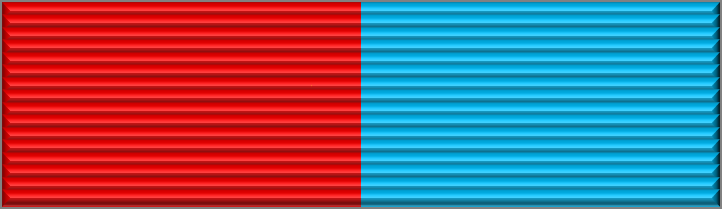
- Fatherland Protection Medal
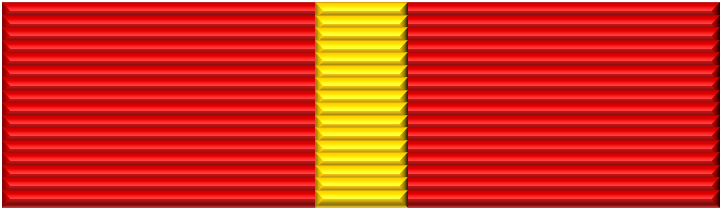
- Glorious Fighter Medal (1st class)
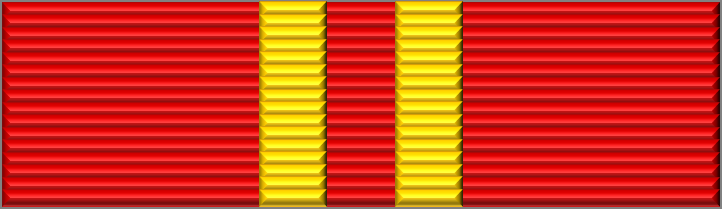
- Glorious Fighter Medal (2nd class)
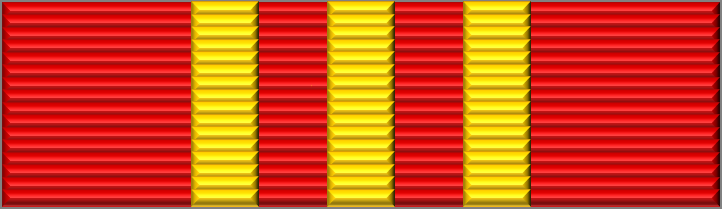
- Glorious Fighter Medal (3rd class)
- 40 years of Party membership badge

=== Foreign awards ===
- Grand Cross of the Royal Order of Sahametrei (Cambodia, 2019)
- Order of Playa Girón (Cuba, 2022)
- Freedom Medal (2nd class) (Laos, 2019)
- Grand Collar of the Order of the Sun of Peru (Peru, 2024)
- Order of Friendship (Russia, 2021)

Political offices
Preceded by Tô Lâm	President of Vietnam; 2024–2026	Succeeded by Tô Lâm
Party political offices
Preceded by Trương Thị Mai	Permanent Member of the Secretariat; 2024	Succeeded by Trần Cẩm Tú
