= Võ Thị Ánh Xuân =

Vice President of Vietnam since 2021

Her Excellency Võ Thị Ánh Xuân
- Xuân in 2026

17th Vice President of Vietnam
- Incumbent
- Assumed office 6 April 2021
- President: Nguyễn Xuân Phúc; Herself (acting); Võ Văn Thưởng; Herself (acting); Tô Lâm; Lương Cường; Tô Lâm
- Preceded by: Đặng Thị Ngọc Thịnh

Acting President of Vietnam
- In office 21 March 2024 – 22 May 2024
- Prime Minister: Phạm Minh Chính
- Vice President: Herself
- Preceded by: Võ Văn Thưởng
- Succeeded by: Tô Lâm
- In office 18 January 2023 – 2 March 2023
- Prime Minister: Phạm Minh Chính
- Vice President: Herself
- Preceded by: Nguyễn Xuân Phúc
- Succeeded by: Võ Văn Thưởng

Party Secretary of An Giang
- In office 2 October 2015 – 16 April 2021
- Preceded by: Phan Văn Sáu
- Succeeded by: Lê Hồng Quang

Personal details
- Born: 8 January 1970 (age 56) Thới Sơn, Tịnh Biên, An Giang, South Vietnam
- Party: Communist Party of Vietnam (1995–)
- Parent: Võ Thị Vân (mother)
- Profession: Politician; Educator

Võ Thị Ánh Xuân (Vietnamese: [vɔ˦ˀ˥ tʰi˧˨ʔ ʔajŋ̟˧˦ swən˧˧]; born 8 January 1970) is a Vietnamese politician and former educator who serves as the 17th vice president of Vietnam since 2021. She served as the acting president of Vietnam twice, in 2023 and 2024. (Note: Xuân has assumed the acting presidency twice: the first time between the resignation of Nguyễn Xuân Phúc on 18 January 2023 and the election of Võ Văn Thưởng on 2 March 2023, and the second time between the resignation of Võ Văn Thưởng on 21 March 2024 and the election of Tô Lâm on 20 May 2024.)

Xuân was elected to the vice presidency on 6 April 2021 after winning 93.13% of the votes in the National Assembly. Prior to her election, she served as the Party Secretary of An Giang province and chaired the province's deputies delegation to the National Assembly. A member of the Party Central Committee, Xuân is the second female (acting) president after Đặng Thị Ngọc Thịnh, who also served as the acting president in 2018. She was the youngest vice president of Vietnam since 1945.

At the 14th Party Congress, Xuân was re-elected to the Central Committee and subsequently elected to the Central Secretariat.

== Early life ==
Xuân was born on 8 January 1970 in Thới Sơn, Tịnh Biên, An Giang province. She was a teacher in a high school in Long Xuyên, An Giang Province from 1992 to 1996. Xuân was accepted in the Communist Party of Vietnam on 20 December 1994, officially becoming a member of the party on 20 December 1995.

== Political career ==
From August 1996 to July 2001, Xuân was a General Research Staff in Office of An Giang Provincial Party Committee. Between 2001 and 2010, she was a member of Standing Board, Vice Chairwoman then Chairwoman of An Giang Women's Union. During that time, she was also a member of the Committee of the An Giang Provincial Party Organisation (December 2005 to October 2010). From August 2010 to October 2010, she was also Deputy Head of An Giang Provincial Commission for Mass Mobilisation.

In January 2016, Xuân was elected a member of the 12th Party Central Committee. After the XIV National Assembly election, she is also the head of the An Giang National Assembly delegation.

On 6 April 2021, the National Assembly of Vietnam adopted a resolution to elect Vo Thi Anh Xuan as Vice President of the Socialist Republic of Vietnam, with the support of 447 out of the 449 deputies present at the sitting, equivalent to 93.13% of the total number of parliamentarians. She is the youngest Vice President of Vietnam since 1945.

On June 30, 2022, she attended the inauguration ceremony of Philippine President Bongbong Marcos. On October 13, 2022, she visited Kazakhstan to attend the 6th Conference on Interaction and Confidence-Building Measures in Asia (CICA) Summit.

=== Acting Presidencies ===
On January 18, 2023, after Nguyễn Xuân Phúc was relieved of his duties as President, she became the Acting President according to the Constitution. On the afternoon of February 4, 2023, at the Presidential Palace, she officially received the handover of duties from Nguyễn Xuân Phúc. On February 24, 2023, she handed over the appointment decisions to 13 new Vietnamese ambassadors abroad.

On 20 March 2024, President Võ Văn Thưởng was relieved of his positions as a head of state, a member of the Politburo, a member of the Party Central Committee, President and Chairman of the National Defense and Security Council. Xuân became the Acting President for the second time. This became an unprecedented feat, as during the XIII Party Central Committee, she became the Acting Female President twice.

==== After the First Acting Presidency ====
From May 3 to May 8, 2023, Xuân attended the 2023 Global Women's Summit in the United Arab Emirates and conducted bilateral activities in the country. She then made an official visit to Qatar from May 7 to May 8. On August 14, 2023, she attended the inauguration ceremony of the construction of 8 classrooms at Vĩnh Phước Primary and Secondary School, a project funded by the Vietnam Oil and Gas Exploration Corporation with nearly 6 billion VND, which was mobilized by Xuân. On October 25, 2023, according to the vote counting results at the 6th session of the 15th National Assembly, Võ Thị Ánh Xuân received 410 high-confidence votes, 65 confidence votes, and 6 low-confidence votes.

==== Second Acting Presidency ====
On March 20, 2024, after Võ Văn Thưởng was granted permission by the Central Committee of the Communist Party to resign from all his positions according to his personal wishes, Xuân will assume the role of Acting President of Vietnam for the second time, as stipulated by the 2013 Constitution, until the 15th National Assembly elects a new President.

== Notes ==
Political offices
Preceded by Nguyễn Xuân Phúc; Võ Văn Thưởng	President of Vietnam; Acting; 2023; 2024	Succeeded by Võ Văn Thưởng; Tô Lâm
Preceded by Đặng Thị Ngọc Thịnh	Vice President of Vietnam; 2021–present	Incumbent
