= Nguyen Xuan On =

Nguyễn Xuân Ôn (c. 1825–1889) was a Vietnamese anti-French nationalist revolutionary, who led the Cần Vương's military operations in Kim Liên in north central Vietnam. He was captured after a former bodyguard was caught by the French and forced to lead an attack on On's headquarters in 1887. He was jailed and died in custody.
