= Lien (disambiguation) =

Lien is any sort of charge or encumbrance against an item of property that secures the payment of a debt.

Lien may also refer to:

- Maritime lien, maritime law term
- Mechanics lien, hold on real property for the benefit of someone whose work or property improves the property
- Tax lien, lien imposed on property by law to secure payment of taxes
- Le lien, the only novel by Vanessa Duriès
- Spleen or lien, an organ of the body

== People with the surname ==
- Lien Chan, Taiwanese politician
- Alexian Lien, victim of Hollywood Stuntz gang assault
- Jennifer Lien, American actress
- Magnhild Lien, Norwegian mathematician
- Mimi Lien, Chinese American set designer

== Characters with the given name ==
- Lien Hughes, character from the As the World Turns
- Lien Neville, character from the King of Fighters: Maximum Impact series
- Lien, a character in Order of the Stick
- Lien, a character and the pilot of God Erlang from Hero of Robots

== See also ==
- Kim Lien (disambiguation)
