= Presidential Palace Historical Site =

Ho Chi Minh's home in Hanoi

Coordinates: 21.038°N 105.833°E

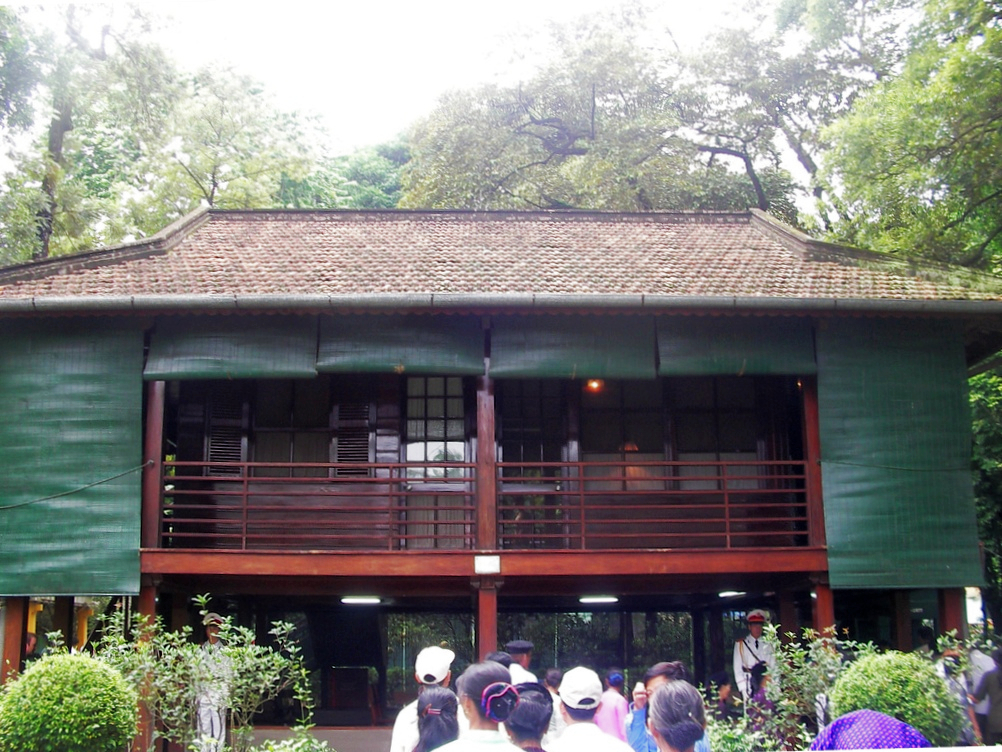
Ho Chi Minh House

The Presidential Palace Historical Site (Vietnamese: Khu di tích Phủ Chủ tịch), which is located in Hanoi, Vietnam, is the place where Ho Chi Minh lived and worked during most of his time as leader of North Vietnam, from December 19, 1954 until his death on September 2, 1969.

== Overview ==
The complex is composed of three residences, namely House No. 54, the Stilt House and House No. 67.

The complex has an area of 14.7 hectares and includes 20 relic sites and 1,738 artefacts associated with Ho. The complex also includes trees planted by Ho and prominent visitors.

== History ==
Ho first lived at House No. 54 from 1954 to 1958 before moving to the Stilt House, where he lived until August 1969.

The Stilt House was designed by Nguyen Van Ninh, former deputy director of the Ministry of Transport and Irrigation’s department of architectural design and was built by soldiers from the North Vietnamese Army. It was built in the style of traditional stilt houses in Việt Bắc. Among Ho's companions in the Stilt House was prime minister Pham Van Dong. In between House No. 54 and the Stilt House is a pond from which Ho used to fish. Following Ho's death, the Politburo of the Communist Party of Vietnam ordered the artefacts at the site to be preserved, leading to them being evacuated as a precaution against US bombing raids during the Vietnam War.

The site was listed by the Ministry of Culture and Information of Vietnam in 1975. In 2009, the site was declared a special national relic.

== See also ==
- Presidential Palace
- Ho Chi Minh Mausoleum
- Ho Chi Minh Museum
