= Kim Liên =

Kim Liên may refer to:

- Kim Liên, Hanoi, a ward of Hanoi
- Kim Liên, Nghệ An, a rural commune of Nam Đàn District
- Kim Liên Museum, a museum that was the childhood home of Ho Chi Minh
