= Vũ Kỳ =

Secretary to Ho Chi Minh

Vũ Kỳ (26 September 1921–16 April 2005) was the personal secretary to Vietnamese leader Ho Chi Minh. He was also a former member in the National Assembly and the former director of the Ho Chi Minh Museum.

Vũ Kỳ was born in 1921 at Thường Tín, Hà Nội. Vũ Kỳ obtained the position of personal secretary on 28 August 1945 after Ho Chi Minh had declared independence from France during the August Revolution, and remained until Ho Chi Minh 's death on 2 September 1969. Vũ Kỳ was born named Vũ Long Chuẩn and later renamed by Ho Chi Minh.

In 1952, Vũ Kỳ was made a full member of the Hanoi Party Committee and was with Ho Chi Minh, serving as his personal secretary, every day until his death. Later in a 1988 interview with National Geographic, Vũ Kỳ explained that in 1969, as Ho Chi Minh's health gradually become worse, Vũ Kỳ secretly sent three local Vietnamese doctors to the Soviet Union to learn the embalming technique (as with the case involving Soviet former leader Vladimir Lenin) for the preservation of Ho Chi Minh's body after death, but Ho was never informed about the plans because he would have "sqwashed" the idea.

In 1970, Vũ Kỳ was a member of the Steering Committee for the construction of the Ho Chi Minh Mausoleum, and later in 1977, the Deputy Director of the Ho Chi Minh Museum. From 1987 to 1990, Vũ Kỳ was the full Director of the Ho Chi Minh Museum as well as a member of the National Assembly from 1987 to 1992. At the dedication of the Ho Chi Minh Museum on 19 May 1990, the 100th anniversary on the birth of Ho Chi Minh, Vũ Kỳ resigned as Director of the Ho Chi Minh Museum.

Vũ Kỳ died in the early morning hours on 16 April 2005 at the Huu Nghi Hospital in Hanoi at age 83, and was buried in Mai Dich Cemetery.
