= Nguyễn Sinh Sắc =

Vietnamese official

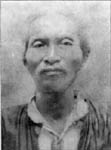
- Portrait of Nguyễn Sinh Sắc
- Born: 1862
- Died: 1929 (aged 66–67)
- Spouse: Hoàng Thị Loan (1868–1901)

Nguyễn Sinh Sắc (chữ Hán: 阮生色, 1862–1929) was the father of Ho Chi Minh.

Hoàng Thị Loan was his wife, the daughter of his adoptive father and teacher. Sắc passed the Confucian cử nhân examination in 1894 and in 1901 gained a second-rank (pho bang) position. He was a magistrate in the Binh Khe district (Qui Nhơn), until he was demoted for abuse of power after a landlord whom he had ordered to be beaten died shortly after receiving a caning. Ho Chi Minh's parents' house is now preserved as the Kim Liên museum.
