= Ho Chi Minh =

Leader of North Vietnam from 1945 to 1969

President Hồ Chí Minh
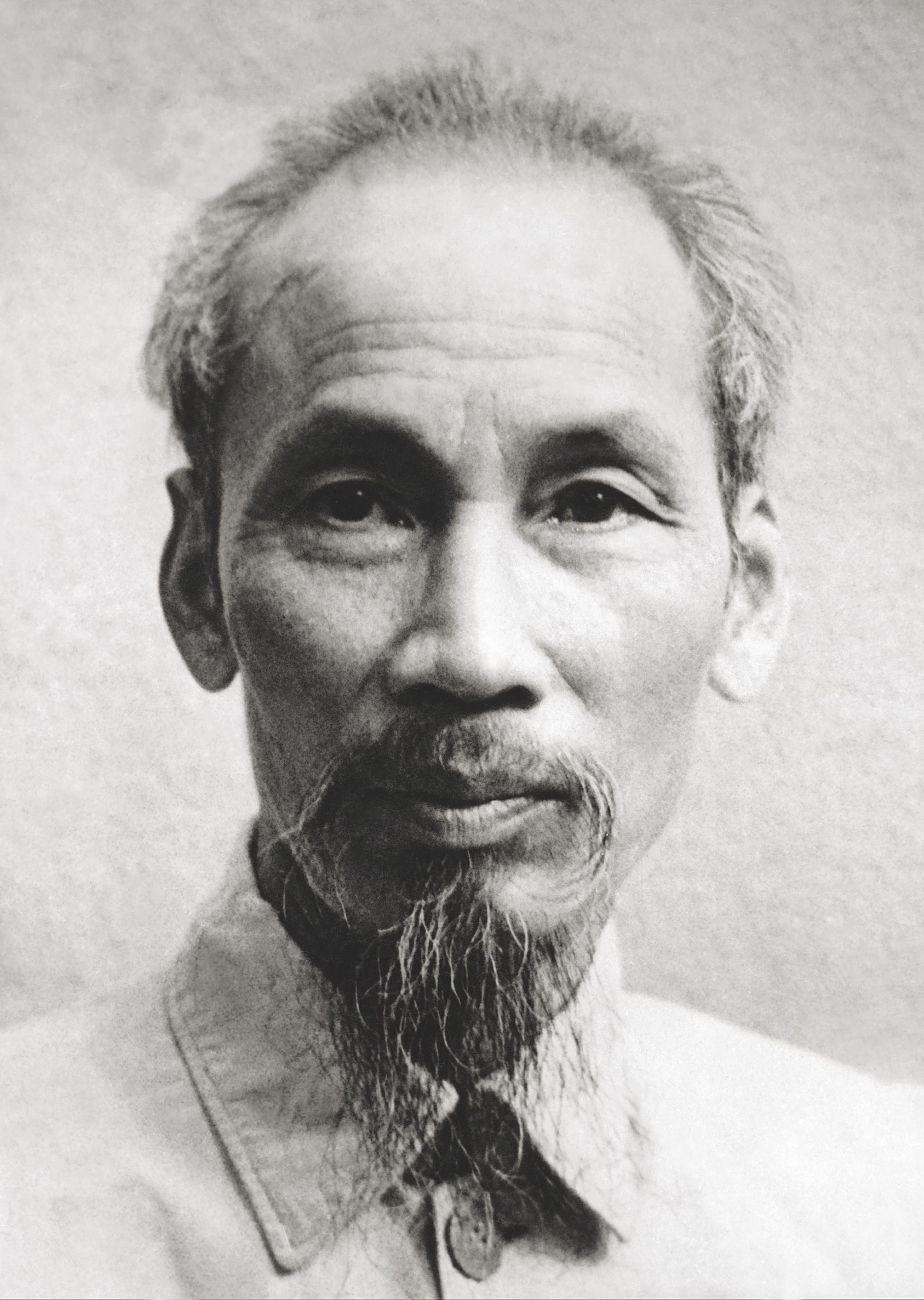
- Portrait, c. 1946

1st President of the Democratic Republic of Vietnam
- In office 6 January 1946 – 2 September 1969 (Note: Ho became president following the disputed 1946 general election. He assumed the presidency of North Vietnam after the 1954 Partition of Vietnam.)
- Prime Minister: Phạm Văn Đồng (from 1955)
- Vice President: Nguyễn Hải Thần (1946); vacant (1946–1960); Tôn Đức Thắng (1960–1969)
- Preceded by: Bảo Đại (as Emperor) Position established
- Succeeded by: Tôn Đức Thắng

Head of Government of the Democratic Republic of Vietnam (Note: As Chairman of Provisional Revolutionary Government of Democratic Republic of Vietnam from 2 September to 31 December 1945; Chairman of Provisional Coalition Government of Democratic Republic of Vietnam from 1 January to 2 March 1946; Chairman of United Resistance Government of Democratic Republic of Vietnam from 2 March to 3 November 1946; and Chairman of United National Government of Democratic Republic of Vietnam from 1946 to 1955.) (Note: According to the 1946 constitution, the president of the republic, was the head of government, rather than a ceremonial head of state. The president also had significantly more power than the current office of president. The later 1959 constitution turned the president into a ceremonial head, while giving de facto power to the party leader.)
- De facto 30 August 1945 (Note: Ho became head of the provisional government following dissolution of the Empire of Vietnam before 2 September.) – 20 September 1955
- President: Himself (from 1946)
- Preceded by: Trần Trọng Kim (as Chief of Cabinet of the Empire of Vietnam)
- Succeeded by: Phạm Văn Đồng

Chairman of the Workers' Party of Vietnam
- In office 19 February 1951 – 2 September 1969
- General Secretary: Trường Chinh; Himself; Lê Duẩn, as First Secretary

General Secretary of the Workers' Party of Vietnam
- In office 5 October 1956 – 10 September 1960
- Chairman: Himself
- Preceded by: Trường Chinh
- Succeeded by: Lê Duẩn (as First Secretary)

Minister of Foreign Affairs
- In office 28 August 1945 – 2 March 1946
- Preceded by: Trần Văn Chương (Empire of Vietnam)
- Succeeded by: Nguyễn Tường Tam
- In office 3 November 1946 – March 1947
- Preceded by: Nguyễn Tường Tam
- Succeeded by: Hoàng Minh Giám

Full Member of the 2nd and 3rd Politburo
- In office 31 March 1935 – 2 September 1969

Personal details
- Born: Nguyễn Sinh Cung; 19 May 1890 Kim Liên, Nghệ An, Annam, French Indochina
- Died: 2 September 1969 (aged 79) Hanoi, North Vietnam
- Resting place: Ho Chi Minh Mausoleum
- Party: Workers' Party of Vietnam (1951–1969)
- Other political affiliations: French Section of the Workers' International (1919–1921); French Communist Party (1921–1925); Indochinese Communist Party (1930–1945); Vietnam Revolutionary League (1943–1944)
- Spouse: Tăng Tuyết Minh (m. 1926; sep. 1931)
- Relations: Bạch Liên (or Nguyễn Thị Thanh; sister); Nguyễn Sinh Khiêm (or Nguyễn Tất Đạt; brother); Nguyễn Sinh Xin (brother)
- Parents: Nguyễn Sinh Sắc (father); Hoàng Thị Loan (mother)
- Education: Communist University of the Toilers of the East
- Occupation: Politician; revolutionary; pastry chef
- Ho Chi Minh's voice Ho's 1945 declaration of independence of Vietnam, post-1954 reenactment

Hồ Chí Minh (Note: chữ Hán: 胡志明, /ˌhoʊ tʃiː ˈmɪn/ HOH chee MIN; Vietnamese: [hò cǐ mīŋ], Saigon: [hò cǐ mɨn].) (born Nguyễn Sinh Cung; (Note: chữ Hán: 阮生恭, Vietnamese: [ŋʷiə̌ˀn sīŋ kūŋm]) (Note: His birth name appeared in a letter from the director of Collège Quốc học, dated 7 August 1908.) 19 May 1890 – 2 September 1969), (Note: The North Vietnamese government initially announced his death on 3 September in order to prevent it from coinciding with National Day. In 1989, the Politburo of unified Vietnam revealed the change, along with changes which were made to his original will, and it revised the date of death to 2 September.) colloquially known as Uncle Ho (Bác Hồ) (Note: [ɓǎːk hò].) among other aliases (Note: including Nguyễn Tất Thành, Nguyễn Ái Quốc, Văn Ba and over 50–200 aliases.) and sobriquets, (Note: including Hồ Chủ tịch ('President Hồ'), Người cha già của dân tộc ('Father of the people'), or 'Founding father of modern Vietnam') was a Vietnamese communist revolutionary and statesman who founded the Democratic Republic of Vietnam in 1945 (known as North Vietnam after 1954). He served as its first president from 1946 until his death in 1969 and as its first prime minister from 1945 to 1955. A committed Marxist–Leninist, Hồ played a central role in establishing the Indochinese Communist Party in 1930 and later led its successor, the Workers' Party of Vietnam (renamed Communist Party of Vietnam after 1976), as chairman until his death.

The details of Hồ's life before he came to power in Vietnam are uncertain. He is known to have used between 50 and 200 pseudonyms. Information on his birth and early life is ambiguous and subject to academic debate. At least four existing official biographies vary on names, dates, places, and other hard facts while unofficial biographies vary even more widely. It is believed that Hồ was born near Vinh, Nghệ An province in Annam, French Indochina (more specifically in the village of Kim Lien) and received a French education. Starting in 1911, he worked in various countries overseas, including France where he was a founding member of the French Communist Party in 1920. After studying in the Soviet Union, Hồ moved to China where he founded the Vietnamese Revolutionary Youth League in 1925, which became the Indochinese Communist Party in 1930. In addition to being involved in politics, Hồ was a writer, poet, and journalist. He wrote several books, articles, and poems in Chinese, Vietnamese, and French.

On his return to Vietnam in 1941, Hồ founded and led the Việt Minh independence movement against the Japanese occupation of Vietnam, and in 1945 led the August Revolution against the Vietnamese monarchy and proclaimed the independence of the Democratic Republic of Vietnam. After the French returned to power, Hồ's government retreated to the countryside and initiated guerrilla warfare from 1946, leading to the First Indochina War. Between 1953 and 1956, Hồ's government implemented a land reform campaign aimed at redistributing land and consolidating power, which included the execution of landowners. In 1954, the Việt Minh defeated the French at the Battle of Điện Biên Phủ, ending the war.

Following the 1954 Geneva Conference, Vietnam was divided into two de facto separate states: North Vietnam under the Việt Minh, backed by the Soviet Union, and South Vietnam under anti-communist nationalists, backed by the United States. Hồ remained president and party leader during the Vietnam War, which began in 1955. He supported the Viet Cong insurgency in the south, overseeing the transport of troops and supplies on the Ho Chi Minh trail until his death from heart failure in 1969. North Vietnam won the war in 1975, and the country was re-unified in 1976 as the Socialist Republic of Vietnam. Saigon–Gia Định, South Vietnam's former capital, was renamed Ho Chi Minh City in his honor.

== Early life ==
Hồ Chí Minh was born as Nguyễn Sinh Cung, (Note: chữ Hán: 阮生恭, Vietnamese pronunciation: [ŋwiə̌ˀn ʂīɲ kūŋ]) also known as Nguyễn Sinh Côn, (Note: chữ Hán: 阮生琨, Vietnamese pronunciation: [ŋwiə̌ˀn ʂīɲ kōn]; pronounced locally as Nguyễn Sinh Côông [ kōːŋ ].) in 1890 in the village of Hoàng Trù in Kim Liên commune, Nghệ An province, in northern Central Vietnam which was then a French protectorate. Although 1890 is generally accepted as his birth year, at various times he used four other birth years: 1891, 1892, (Note: In his application to the French Colonial School – "Nguyen Tat Thanh, born 1892 at Vinh, son of Mr. Nguyen Sinh Huy (sub doctor in literature)") 1894 (Note: He told Paris Police (Surete) he was born 15 January 1894.) and 1895. He lived in his father Nguyễn Sinh Sắc's village of Làng Sen in Kim Liên until 1895 when his father sent him to Huế for study. He had three siblings: his sister Bạch Liên (Nguyễn Thị Thanh), was convicted of breaking into and stealing weapons from a French military barracks; his brother Nguyễn Sinh Khiêm (Nguyễn Tất Đạt), a geomancer and traditional herbalist; and another brother (Nguyễn Sinh Nhuận), who died in infancy. As a young child, Cung (Hồ) studied with his father before more formal classes with a scholar named Vương Thúc Quý. He quickly mastered chữ Hán, a prerequisite for any serious study of Confucianism while honing his colloquial Vietnamese writing. In addition to his studies, he was fond of adventure and loved to fly kites and go fishing. Following Confucian tradition, his father gave him a new name when he turned ten: Nguyễn Tất Thành. (Note: chữ Hán: 阮必誠, Vietnamese pronunciation: [ŋwiə̌ˀn tʌ̌k t̺ʰàɲ])

His father, Sắc, was a Confucian scholar and teacher, and later, in 1909, an imperial magistrate in the remote district of Bình Khê in Bình Định province. He was demoted for abuse of power after an influential local figure died several days after having received 102 strokes of the cane as punishment for an infraction. Sắc was both a patriot and a collaborator with the French colonial state, supporting the claimedly 'civilizing mission' of the French. Thành received a French education, attending Collège Quốc học (lycée or secondary education) in Huế in Central Vietnam. His disciples, Phạm Văn Đồng and Võ Nguyên Giáp, also attended the school, as did Ngô Đình Diệm, the future President of South Vietnam and political rival.

His early life is uncertain but there are some documents indicating activities regarding an early revolutionary spirit during French-occupied Vietnam, but conflicting sources remain. Previously, it was believed that Thành (Hồ) was involved in an anti-slavery (anti-corvée) demonstration of poor peasants in Huế in May 1908, which endangered his student status at Collège Quốc học. However, a document from the Centre des archives d'Outre-mer in France shows that he was admitted to Collège Quốc học on 8 August 1908, which was several months after the anti-corvée demonstration (9–13 April 1908).

== Overseas ==
=== In France ===
In Saigon, he applied to work as a kitchen helper on a French merchant steamer, the Amiral de Latouche-Tréville, using the alias Văn Ba. The ship departed on 5 June 1911 and arrived in Marseille, France on 5 July 1911. The ship then left for Le Havre and Dunkirk, returning to Marseille in mid-September. There, he applied for the French Colonial School but did not succeed. He instead decided to begin traveling the world by working on ships and visiting many countries from 1911 to 1917.

=== In Brazil ===
On board of Amiral de Latouche-Tréville, Thành (Hồ) arrived in Rio de Janeiro in 1912. After contracting a mysterious disease aboard, the ship left him in the city to die and continued its route. Whilst recovering, he settled in the neighbourhood of Santa Teresa and worked in a restaurant in Lapa. In Rio, he encountered a fervid atmosphere largely defined by the contrast between its bohemian city life and the social exclusion of its black population. Thành would frequently return to the port, seeking to find a ship on which he could embark. He eventually became acquainted with a black union leader named José Leandro 'Pernambuco' da Silva. Just two years after the Revolt of the Lash had broken in the same harbour, Da Silva led a struggle against corporal punishment inflicted against black workers, a practice dating back from the time of slavery.

Later in his life, Ho Chi Minh would recount José Leandro da Silva's struggle in his International Solidarity article. He describes how Da Silva led a strike demanding an eight-hour working day and equal pay for black and white workers, which resulted in him being ambushed by ten police officers, who shot him eleven times. According to Ho, Da Silva sang The Internationale in the ambulance and was later acquitted in court following a campaign of pressure organised by workers and lawyers, an outcome that Thành celebrated.

=== In the United States ===
In either September or October of 1912, Thành embarked on a ship that brought him to Boston. From 1912 to 1913, he may have lived in New York City (Harlem) and Boston, where he claimed to have worked as a baker at the Parker House Hotel. The only evidence that he was in the United States is a single letter to French colonial administrators dated 15 December 1912 and postmarked New York City (he gave his address as the poste restante in Le Havre and his occupation as a sailor) and a postcard to Phan Chu Trinh in Paris where he mentioned working at the Parker House Hotel. Inquiries to the Parker House management revealed no records of him ever having worked there. It is believed that while in the U.S. he made contact with Korean nationalists, an experience that developed his political outlook. Sophie Quinn-Judge states that this is "in the realm of conjecture". He was also influenced by Pan-Africanist and black nationalist Marcus Garvey during his stay, and said he attended meetings of the Universal Negro Improvement Association.

=== In the United Kingdom ===
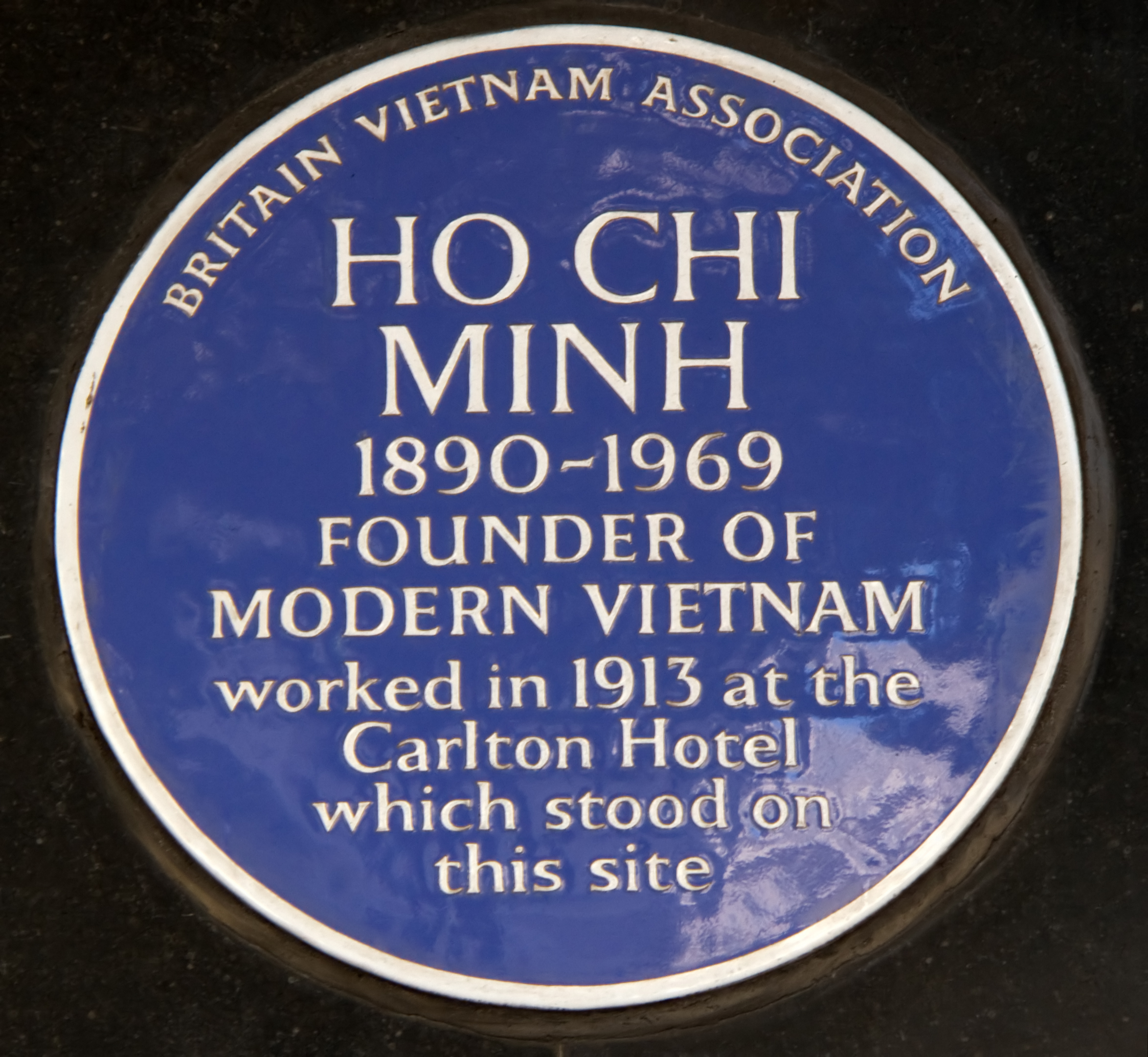
Commemorative plaque in Haymarket in London

At various points from 1913 to 1919, Thành (Hồ) claimed to have lived in West Ealing and later in Crouch End, Hornsey. He reportedly worked as either a chef or dishwasher (reports vary) at the Drayton Court Hotel in West Ealing. Claims that he was trained as a pastry chef under Auguste Escoffier at the Carlton Hotel in Haymarket, Westminster are not supported by documentary evidence. However, the wall of New Zealand House, home of the New Zealand High Commission which now stands on the site of the Carlton Hotel, displays a blue plaque. During 1913, Thành was also employed as a pastry chef on the Newhaven–Dieppe ferry route.

== Political activities in France ==
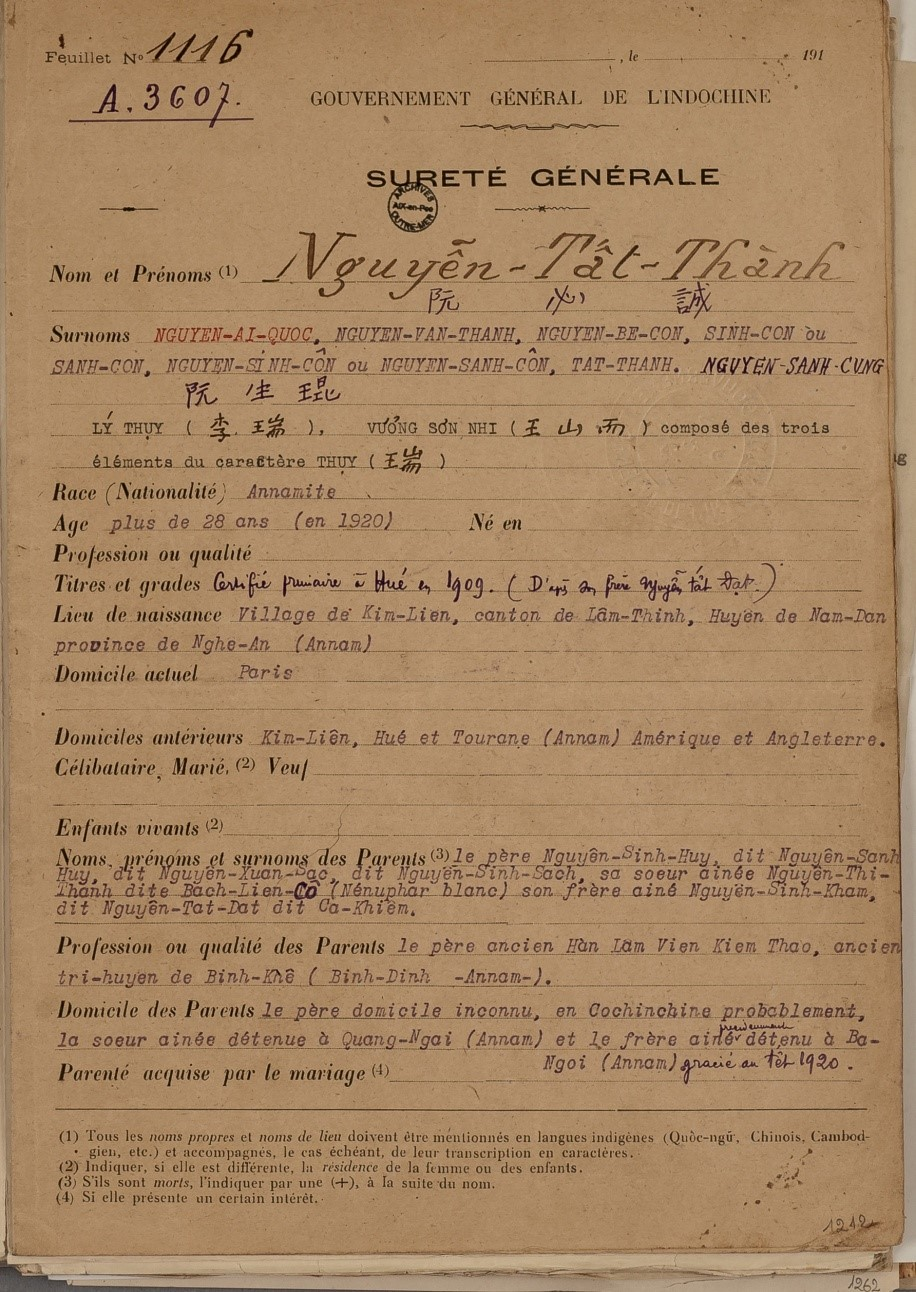
1920 security report by the French Indochinese government on Nguyễn Tất Thành listing his aliases, places of residence, his father's occupation, as well as other information.

Hồ Chí Minh, 1921, using the pseudonym Nguyễn Ái Quốc, attending a Communist congress in Marseille, France.

From 1919 to 1923, Thành (Hồ) began to show an interest in politics while living in France, being influenced by his friend and comrade from the French Section of the Workers' International, Marcel Cachin. Thành claimed to have arrived in Paris from London in 1917, but the French police had only documents recording his arrival in June 1919. When he arrived, he met a scholar named Phan Châu Trinh as well as his friend Phan Văn Trường.

In Paris, he joined the Groupe des Patriotes Annamites (The Group of Vietnamese Patriots) that included Phan Chu Trinh, Phan Văn Trường, Nguyễn Thế Truyền and Nguyễn An Ninh. They had been publishing newspaper articles advocating for Vietnamese independence under the pseudonym Nguyễn Ái Quốc (Note: Vietnamese pronunciation: [ŋwiə̌ˀn ǎj kwuə̌k]) ("Nguyễn the Patriot") prior to Thành's arrival in Paris. The group petitioned for recognition of the civil rights of the Vietnamese people in French Indochina to the Western powers at the Versailles peace talks, but they were ignored. Citing the principle of self-determination outlined before the peace accords, they requested the allied powers to end French colonial rule of Vietnam and ensure the formation of an independent government.

Before the conference, the group sent their letter to allied leaders, including French Prime Minister Georges Clemenceau and United States President Woodrow Wilson. They were unable to obtain consideration at Versailles, but the episode would later help establish the future Hồ Chí Minh as the symbolic leader of the anti-colonial movement at home in Vietnam. Since Thành was the public face behind the publication of the document (although it was written by Phan Văn Trường), he soon became known as Nguyễn Ái Quốc, and first used the name in September during an interview with a Chinese newspaper correspondent. Many authors have stated that 1919 was a lost "Wilsonian moment", where the future Hồ Chí Minh could have adopted a pro-American and less radical position if only President Wilson had received him. However, at the time of the Versailles Conference, Hồ Chí Minh was committed to a socialist program. While the conference was ongoing, Nguyễn Ái Quốc was already delivering speeches on the prospects of Bolshevism in Asia and was attempting to persuade French socialists to join Lenin's Communist International. Upon hearing of the October 1920 death of Irish republican hunger striker (and Lord Mayor of Cork) Terence MacSwiney, Quốc (Hồ) was said to have burst into tears and said “a country with a citizen like this will never surrender”.

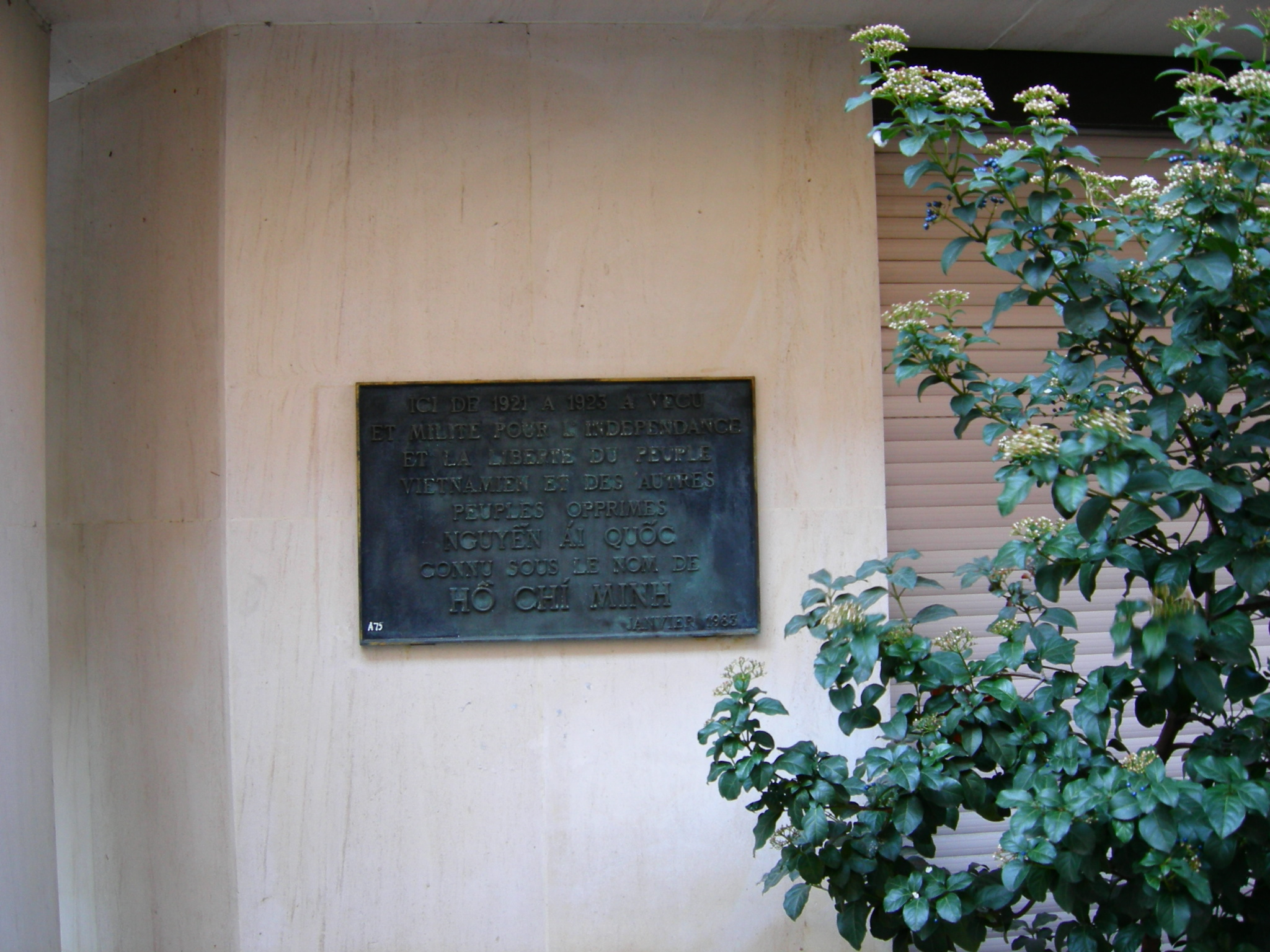
A plaque in Compoint Lane, 17th arrondissement of Paris, indicates where Hồ Chí Minh lived from 1921 to 1923

In December 1920, Quốc (Hồ) became a representative to the Congress of Tours of the French Section of the Workers' International, voted for the Third International, and was a founding member of the French Communist Party. Taking a position in the Colonial Committee of the party, he tried to draw his comrades' attention towards people in French colonies including Indochina, but his efforts were often unsuccessful. While living in Paris, he reportedly had a relationship with a dressmaker named Marie Brière. As a French police document discovered in 2018, Quốc also had relations with members of the Provisional Government of the Republic of Korea like Kim Kyu-sik and Jo So-ang while in Paris. While there, Ho Chi Minh broadened his political opportunities through contact with Chinese and Korean nationalists, many of whom were linked to Christian institutions, as well as with French and Vietnamese Protestants. While aware of Protestant discourses on liberty, his commitment lay with proletarian internationalism. From 1919 onward, he embraced Leninist anti-colonial positions and eventually aligned with the French Communist Party. Over time, his political stance became more rigid and exclusive.

During this period, he began to write journal articles and short stories as well as run his Vietnamese nationalist group. In May 1922, he wrote an article for a French magazine criticizing the use of English words by French sportswriters. The article implored Prime Minister Raymond Poincaré to outlaw such Franglais as le manager, le round and le knock-out. His articles and speeches caught the attention of Dmitry Manuilsky, who would soon sponsor his trip to the Soviet Union and under whose tutelage he would become a high-ranking member of the Soviet Comintern.

== In the Soviet Union and China ==
External videos
- Booknotes interview with William Duiker on Hồ Chí Minh: A Life, 12 November 2000, C-SPAN

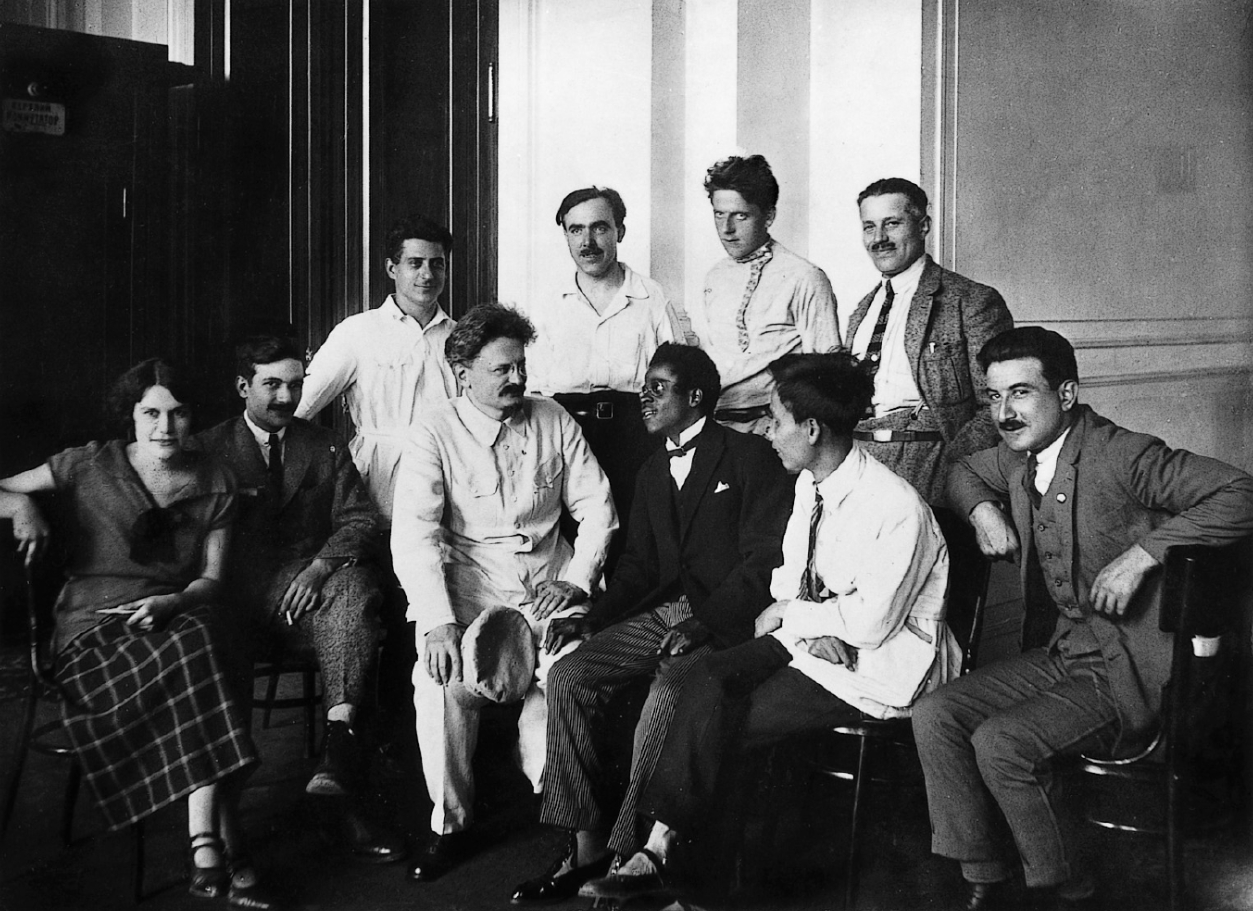
Hồ Chí Minh (seated, second from right) alongside Leon Trotsky and others at the 5th World Congress of the Communist International, 1924

In 1923, Quốc (Hồ) left Paris for Moscow carrying a passport with the name Chen Vang, a Chinese merchant, where he was employed by the Comintern, studied at the Communist University of the Toilers of the East and in January 1924, attended Lenin's funeral. Hồ participated in the Fifth Comintern Congress in June 1924. At some point during late 1924 to early 1925, Hồ was dispatched to Canton (Guangzhou) in China. The Comintern assigned him to assist and interpret for Mikhail Borodin, who was the Comintern envoy to the Kuomintang Revolutionary Committee there.

In Canton, Hồ organized the Vietnamese Revolutionary Youth League. He opened a political training school for Vietnamese revolutionaries, and in 1925–1926, he organized "Youth Education Classes" and occasionally gave socialist lectures to Vietnamese revolutionary young people living in Canton at the Whampoa Military Academy. These young people would become the seeds of a new revolutionary, pro-communist movement in Vietnam several years later. According to William Duiker, he lived with a Chinese woman, Zeng Xueming (Tăng Tuyết Minh), whom he married on 18 October 1926. When his comrades objected to the match, he told them: "I will get married despite your disapproval because I need a woman to teach me the language and keep house". She was 21 and he was 36. They married in the same place where Zhou Enlai had married earlier and then lived in the residence of Borodin.

Hoàng Văn Chí, a Vietnamese anti-communist writer, argued that in June 1925 he betrayed Phan Bội Châu, the famous leader of a rival revolutionary faction and his father's old friend, to French Secret Service agents in Shanghai for 100,000 piastres. A source states that he later claimed he did it because he expected Châu's trial to stir up anti-French sentiment and because he needed the money to establish a communist organization. In Ho Chi Minh: A Life, William Duiker considered this hypothesis, but ultimately rejected it. This hypothesis was also rejected by Sophie Quinn-Judge and Duncan McCargo, who argued that this is likely propaganda invented by anti-communist authors, considering that Lâm Đức Thụ's reports showed that the French already had all the information they needed from their own spies. Also, according to Quinn-Judge and McCargo, Hồ was rapidly gaining supporters from the "best elements" of the Vietnamese nationalist movement to his ideas, thus having no motivation to eliminate Phan, who considered Hồ more as a successor than a competitor. Thus, Hồ had plenty of reasons to support such a respected activist as a figurehead for his movement. Other sources claim that Nguyễn Thượng Huyện was responsible for Chau's capture. Chau, sentenced to lifetime house arrest, never denounced Quốc.

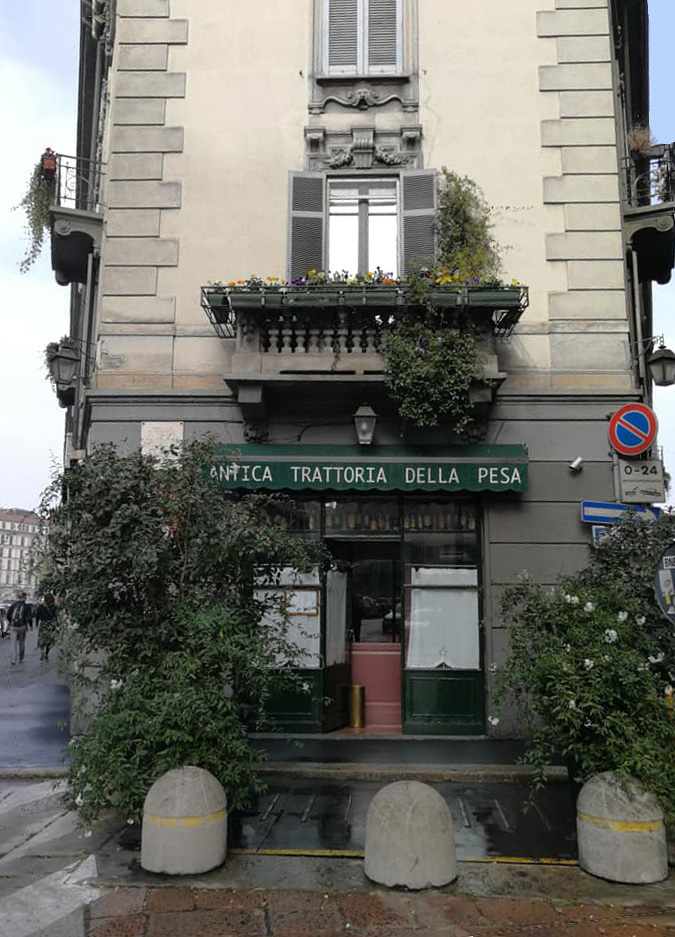
Hồ Chí Minh worked as a cook all over the world from 1911 to 1928, including Milan. This plaque in Via Pasubio, on the left next to "Antica Trattoria Della Pesa", remembers one of his workplaces.

After Chiang Kai-shek's 1927 anti-communist coup, Quốc (Hồ) left Canton again in April 1927 and returned to Moscow, spending part of the summer of 1927 recuperating from tuberculosis in Crimea before returning to Paris once more in November. He then returned to Asia by way of Brussels, Berlin, Switzerland, and Italy, where he sailed to Bangkok, Thailand, arriving in July 1928. "Although we have been separated for almost a year, our feelings for each other do not have to be said to be felt", he reassured Zeng in an intercepted letter.

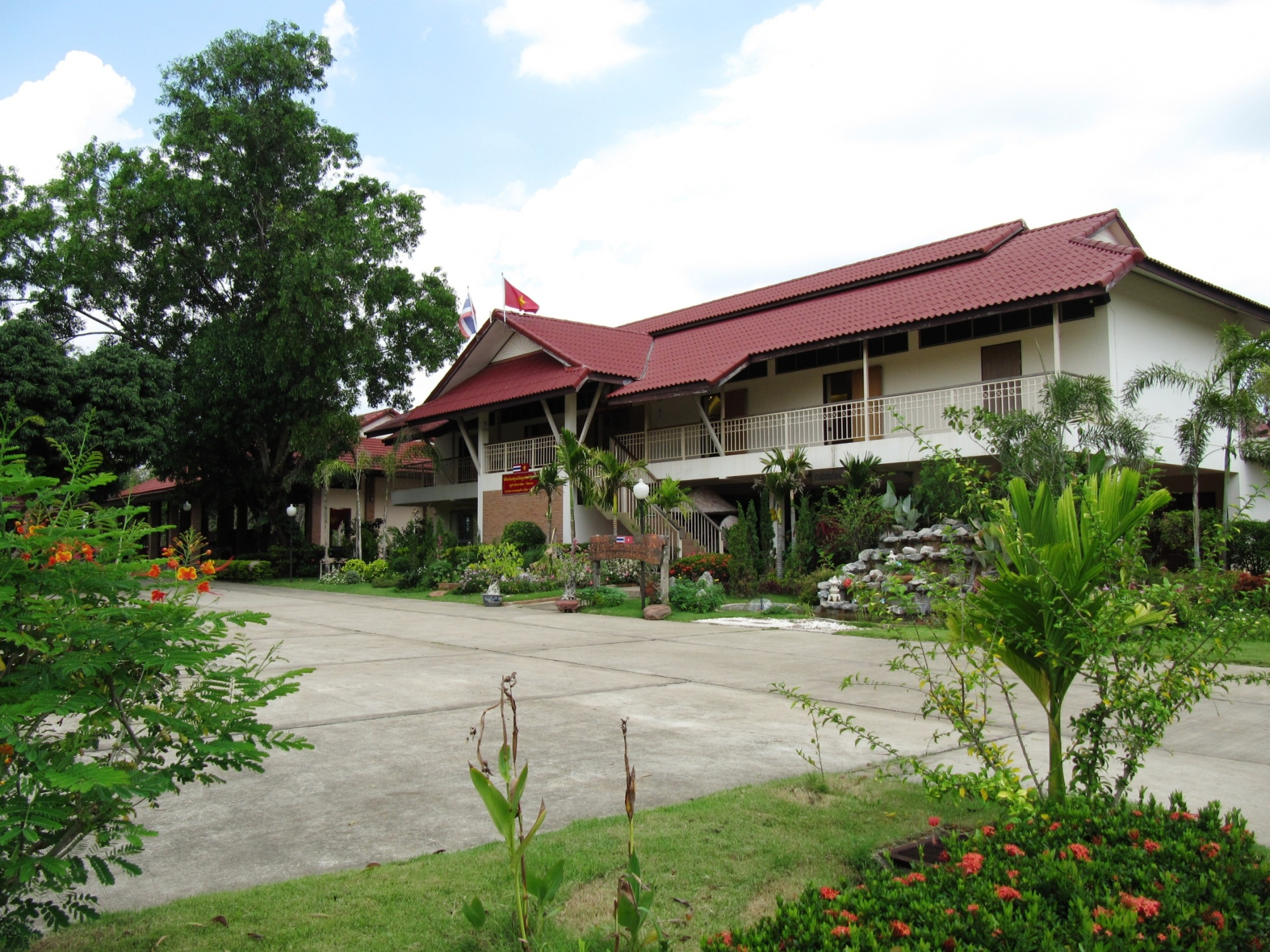
House on Memorium for Hồ Chí Minh in Ban Nachok, Nakhon Phanom, Thailand

Quốc (Hồ) remained in Thailand, staying in the Thai village of Nachok until late 1929, when he moved on to India and then Shanghai. In Hong Kong in early 1930, he chaired a meeting with representatives from two Vietnamese communist parties to merge them into a unified organization, the Communist Party of Vietnam. He also founded the Indochinese Communist Party (ICP). In June 1931, Hồ was arrested by the Royal Hong Kong Police Force (RHKPF) as part of a joint operation between French authorities in Indochina and the RHKPF's Anti-Communist Squad; scheduled to be extradited from Hong Kong to French Indochina, Hồ was successfully defended by the local solicitor Frank Loseby. Eventually, after appeals to the British Privy Council, Hồ was reported as dead in 1932 to avoid being extradited to Indochina; it was ruled that, though he would be deported from Hong Kong as an undesirable, it would not be to a destination controlled by France. Hồ was eventually released and escorted to Shantou. He subsequently returned to the Soviet Union and studied and taught at the Lenin Institute in Moscow.

In this period Hồ reportedly lost his positions in the Comintern because of a concern that he had betrayed the organization. However, according to Ton That Thien's research, he was a member of the inner circle of the Comintern, a protégé of Dmitry Manuilsky and a member in good standing with the Comintern throughout the Great Purge. Hồ was removed from control of the Party he had founded. At that time, the Comintern emphasized class struggle more than finding common ground with non-communists to oppose imperialism. ICP leadership who replaced criticized Hồ for what they described as his nationalist tendencies. In 1937, Japanese aggression in China and the Nazis' policies prompted the Comintern to emphasize working with anti-fascist groups among non-communists, and Hồ returned to the party's favor.

In 1938, Quốc (Hồ) returned to China and served as an advisor to the Chinese Communist armed forces. He was also the senior Comintern agent in charge of Asian affairs. He served in the Eighth Route Army branch office in Guilin. In 1939, he served under the command of Marshal Ye Jianying.

When France was defeated by Germany in 1940, Hồ and his lieutenants, Võ Nguyên Giáp and Phạm Văn Đồng, saw this as an opportunity to advance their own cause. In October 1940, Hồ and his supporters established the League for Vietnamese Independence (Việt Minh) in Guilin.

== Viet Minh movement ==
In 1941, Hồ Chí Minh returned to Vietnam to lead the Việt Minh independence movement. Hồ and the ICP founded a communist-led united front to oppose the Japanese.

The Japanese occupation of Indochina that year, the first step toward an invasion of the rest of Southeast Asia, created an opportunity for patriotic Vietnamese. The so-called "men in black" were a 10,000-member guerrilla force that operated with the Việt Minh. He oversaw many successful military actions against the Vichy France and the Japanese occupation of Vietnam during World War II, supported closely yet clandestinely by the United States Office of Strategic Services and later against the French bid to reoccupy the country (1946–1954). He was jailed in China by Chiang Kai-shek's local authorities before being rescued by Chinese Communists. Following his release in 1943, he returned to Vietnam. It was during this time that he began regularly using the name Hồ Chí Minh, a Vietnamese name combining a common Vietnamese surname (Hồ, 胡) with a given name meaning "Bright spirit" or "Clear will" (from Sino-Vietnamese 志 明: Chí meaning "will" or "spirit" and Minh meaning "bright"). His new name was a tribute to General Hou Zhiming (侯志明), Chief Commissar of the 4th Military Region of the National Revolutionary Army, who helped release him from a KMT prison in 1943.

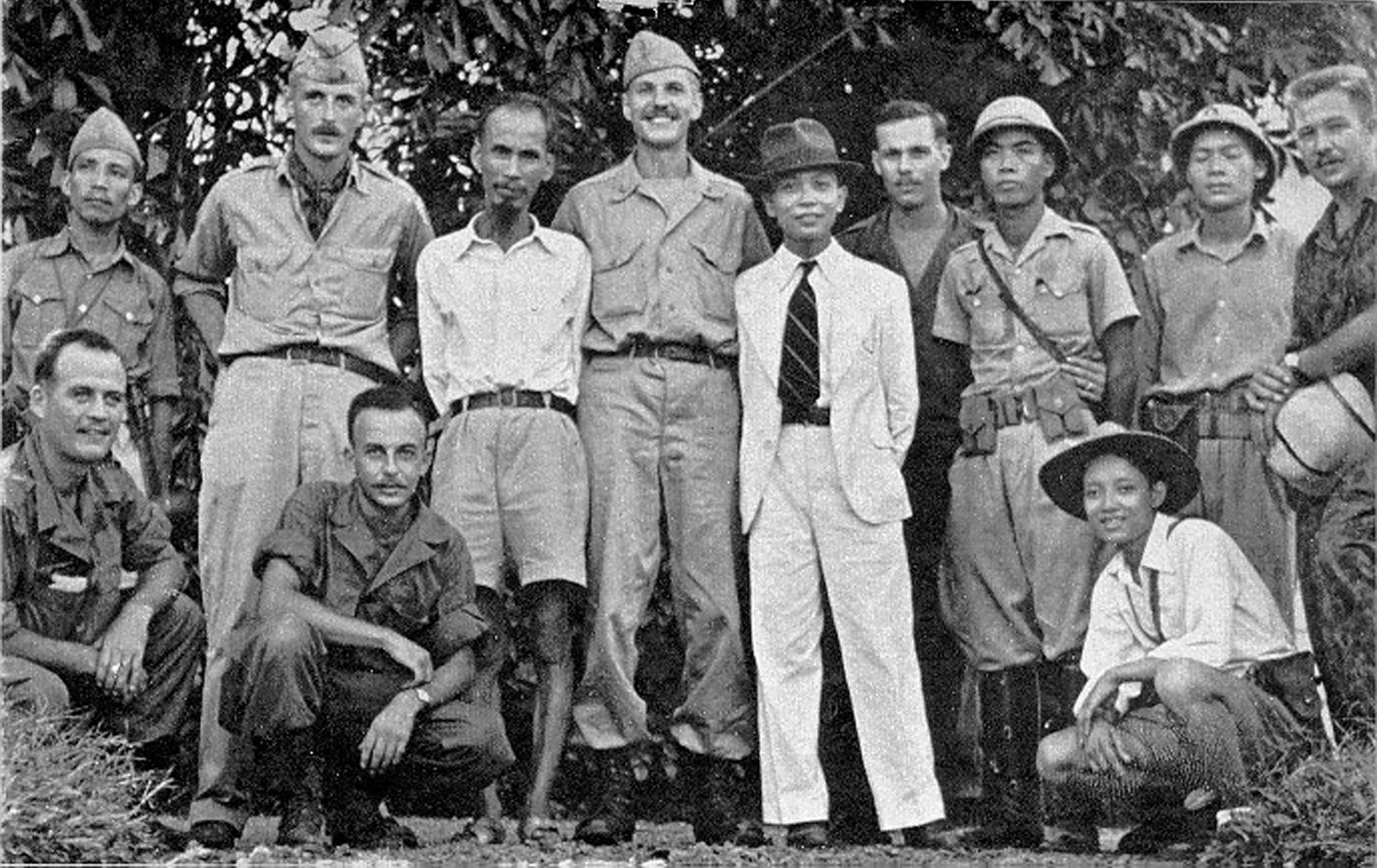
Hồ Chí Minh (third from left, standing) with the OSS in 1945

In April 1945, he met with the OSS agent Archimedes Patti and offered to provide intelligence, asking only for "a line of communication" between his Viet Minh and the Allies. The OSS agreed to this and later sent a military team of OSS members to train his men and Hồ Chí Minh himself was treated for malaria and dysentery by an OSS doctor.

Following the August Revolution organized by the Việt Minh, Hồ Chí Minh became Chairman of the Provisional Government (Premier of the Democratic Republic of Vietnam) and issued a Proclamation of Independence of the Democratic Republic of Vietnam. Although he convinced former Emperor Bảo Đại to abdicate, his government was not recognized by any country. He repeatedly petitioned President Harry S. Truman for support for Vietnamese independence, citing the Atlantic Charter, but Truman never responded.

In 1946, future Israeli Prime Minister David Ben-Gurion and Hồ Chí Minh became acquainted when they stayed at the same hotel in Paris. He suggested Ben-Gurion establish his Jewish state in Vietnam, which Ben-Gurion declined.

=== Establishment of the Democratic Republic of Vietnam ===
Following Emperor Bảo Đại's abdication in August, Hồ Chí Minh read the Declaration of Independence of Vietnam on 2 September 1945 under the name of the Democratic Republic of Vietnam. In Saigon, with violence between rival Vietnamese factions and French forces increasing, the British commander, General Sir Douglas Gracey, declared martial law. On 24 September, the Việt Minh leaders responded with a call for a general strike.

In the same month, a force of 200,000 Chinese National Revolutionary Army troops arrived in Hanoi to accept the surrender of the Japanese occupiers in northern Indochina. Hồ Chí Minh made a compromise with their general, Lu Han, to dissolve the Communist Party and to hold an election that would yield a coalition government. When Chiang forced the French to give the French concessions in Shanghai back to China in exchange for withdrawing from northern Indochina, he had no choice but to sign an agreement with France on 6 March 1946 in which Vietnam would be recognized as an autonomous state in the Indochinese Federation and the French Union. The agreement soon broke down. The purpose of the agreement, for both the French and Vietminh, was for Chiang's army to leave North Vietnam. Fighting broke out in the North soon after the Chinese left.

Historian Professor Liam Kelley of the University of Hawaii at Manoa on his Le Minh Khai's Asian History Blog challenged the authenticity of the alleged quote where Hồ Chí Minh said he "would rather smell French shit for five years than eat Chinese shit for a thousand," noting that Stanley Karnow provided no source for the extended quote attributed to him in his 1983 Vietnam: A History and that the original quote was most likely forged by the Frenchman Paul Mus in his 1952 book Vietnam: Sociologie d'une Guerre. Mus was a supporter of French colonialism in Vietnam and Hồ Chí Minh believed there was no danger of Chinese troops staying in Vietnam. The Vietnamese at the time were busy spreading anti-French propaganda as evidence of French atrocities in Vietnam emerged, while Hồ Chí Minh showed no qualms about accepting Chinese aid after 1949.

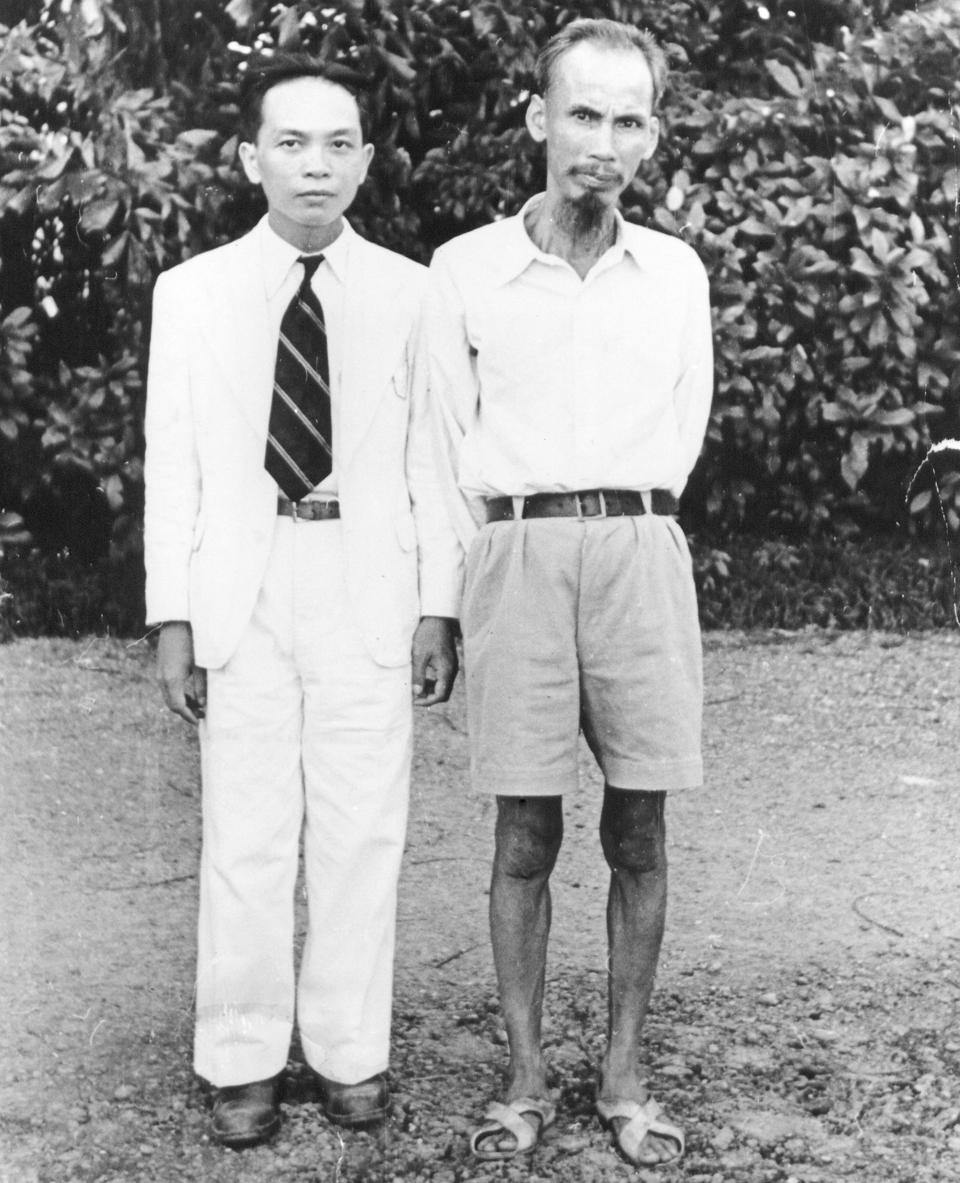
Võ Nguyên Giáp (left) with Hồ Chí Minh (right) in Hanoi in 1945

In 1946, when he traveled outside of the country, his subordinates imprisoned 2,500 non-communist nationalists and forced 6,000 others to flee. Hundreds of political opponents were executed or exiled in July 1946, notably, members of the Vietnamese Nationalist Party and Đại Việt Nationalist Party after a failed attempt to raise a coup against the Viet Minh government. The Việt Minh then collaborated with French colonial forces to massacre supporters of rival Vietnamese nationalist movements in 1945–1946, and of the Trotskyists. All rival political parties were hereafter banned and local governments were purged to minimize opposition later on. Trotskyism in Vietnam did not rival the Party outside of the major cities, but particularly in the South, in Saigon-Cochinchina, they had been a challenge. From the outset, they had called for armed resistance to a French restoration and an immediate transfer of industry to workers and land to peasants. The French Socialist leader Daniel Guérin recalls that when in Paris in 1946 he asked Hồ Chí Minh about the fate of the Trotskyist leader Tạ Thu Thâu, Hồ Chí Minh had replied, "with unfeigned emotion," that "'Thâu was a great patriot and we mourn him', but then a moment later added in a steady voice 'All those who do not follow the line which I have laid down will be broken.'"

The Communists eventually suppressed all non-Communist parties, but they failed to secure a peace deal with France. In the final days of 1946, after a year of diplomatic failure and many concessions in agreements, such as the Dalat and Fontainebleau conferences, the Democratic Republic of Vietnam government found that war was inevitable. The bombardment of Haiphong by the French Navy only strengthened the belief that France had no intention of allowing an autonomous, independent state in Vietnam. The attack reportedly killed more than 6,000 Vietnamese civilians in Haiphong. French forces marched into Hanoi, now the capital city of the Democratic Republic of Vietnam. On 19 December 1946, after the Haiphong incident, Hồ Chí Minh declared war against the French, marking the beginning of the First Indochina War. The Vietnam National Army, mostly armed with machetes and muskets immediately attacked. They assaulted the French positions, smoking them out with straw bundled with chili pepper, destroying armored vehicles with "lunge mines" (a hollow-charge warhead on the end of a pole, detonated by thrusting the charge against the side of a tank; typically a suicide weapon) and Molotov cocktails, holding off attackers by using roadblocks, landmines and gravel. After two months of fighting, the exhausted Việt Minh forces withdrew after systematically destroying any valuable infrastructure. Hồ was mistakenly reported to be captured by a group of French soldiers, led by Jean Étienne Valluy at Việt Bắc, during Operation Léa. The person in question turned out to be a Việt Minh advisor who was killed trying to escape.

According to journalist Bernard Fall, Hồ decided to negotiate a truce after fighting the French for several years. When the French negotiators arrived at the meeting site, they found a mud hut with a thatched roof. Inside they found a long table with chairs. In one corner of the room, a silver ice bucket contained ice and a bottle of good champagne, indicating that Hồ expected the negotiations to succeed. One demand by the French was the return to French custody of several Japanese military officers (who had been helping the Vietnamese armed forces by training them in the use of weapons of Japanese origin) for them to stand trial for war crimes committed during World War II. Hồ Chí Minh replied that the Japanese officers were allies and friends whom he could not betray, therefore he walked out to seven more years of war.

In February 1950, after the Battle of Route Coloniale 4 successfully broke the French border blockade, he met with Joseph Stalin and Mao Zedong in Moscow after the Soviet Union recognized his government. They all agreed that China would be responsible for backing the Việt Minh. Mao Zedong's emissary to Moscow stated in August that China planned to train 60,000–70,000 Viet Minh shortly. The road to the outside world was open for Việt Minh forces to receive additional supplies which would allow them to escalate the fight against the French regime throughout Indochina. At the outset of the conflict, Hồ reportedly told a French visitor: "You can kill ten of my men for every one I kill of yours. But even at those odds, you will lose and I will win". In 1954, the First Indochina War came to an end after the decisive Battle of Dien Bien Phu, where more than 10,000 French soldiers surrendered to the Viet Minh. The subsequent Geneva Accords peace process partitioned North Vietnam at the 17th parallel.

Arthur Dommen estimates that the Việt Minh killed between 100,000 and 150,000 civilians during the war. Benjamin Valentino estimates that the French were responsible for 60,000–250,000 civilian deaths.

== Leadership of North Vietnam ==
The 1954 Geneva Conference concluded the war between France and the Việt Minh, allowing the latter's forces to regroup in the North whilst anti-Communist groups settled in the South. Hồ's Democratic Republic of Vietnam relocated to Hanoi and became the government of North Vietnam, a Communist-led one-party state. Following the Geneva Accords, there was to be a 300-day period in which people could freely move between the two regions of Vietnam, later known as South Vietnam and North Vietnam. During the 300 days, Ngô Đình Diệm and CIA adviser Colonel Edward Lansdale staged a campaign to convince Northerners, particularly Catholics to move to South Vietnam. The CIA's efforts played a minimal role, as Catholic migrants were driven primarily by their own convictions and circumstances rather than external psychological operations. Between 800,000 and 1 million people migrated to the South. With the withdrawal from the French Union and the dissolution of French Indochina in early 1955, Diem assumed temporary control of South Vietnam.

All the parties at Geneva called for reunification elections, but they could not agree on the details. Recently appointed Việt Minh acting foreign minister Phạm Văn Đồng proposed elections under the supervision of "local commissions". The U.S., with the support of Britain and the Associated States of Vietnam, Laos, and Cambodia, suggested United Nations supervision. This plan was rejected by Soviet representative Vyacheslav Molotov, who argued for a commission composed of an equal number of communist and non-communist members, which could determine "important" issues only by unanimous agreement. The negotiators were unable to agree on a date for the elections for reunification. North Vietnam argued that the elections should be held within six months of the ceasefire while the Western allies sought to have no deadline. Molotov proposed June 1955, then later softened this to any time in 1955 and finally July 1956. The Diệm government supported reunification elections, but only with effective international supervision, arguing that genuinely free elections were otherwise impossible in the totalitarian North.

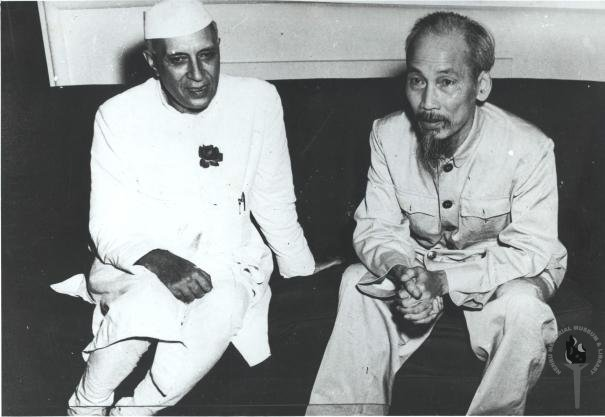
Ho Chi Minh with then Indian Prime Minister Jawaharlal Nehru in New Delhi, India, 7 February 1958

By the afternoon of 20 July 1954, the remaining outstanding issues were resolved as the parties agreed that the partition line should be at the 17th parallel and the elections for a reunified government should be held in July 1956, two years after the ceasefire. The Agreement on the Cessation of Hostilities in Vietnam was only signed by the French and Việt Minh military commands, with no participation or consultation of the State of Vietnam. Based on a proposal by Chinese delegation head Zhou Enlai, an International Control Commission (ICC) was established to supervise the ceasefire under the Geneva Accords. Chaired by India, the commission included Canada and Poland as its other members. Because issues were to be decided unanimously, Poland's presence in the ICC provided the Communists with effective veto power over supervision of the treaty. The unsigned Final Declaration of the Geneva Conference called for reunification elections, which the majority of delegates expected to be supervised by the ICC. The Việt Minh never accepted ICC authority over such elections, insisting that the ICC's "competence was to be limited to the supervision and control of the implementation of the Agreement on the Cessation of Hostilities by both parties". Of the nine nations represented, only the United States and the State of Vietnam refused to accept the declaration. Undersecretary of state Walter Bedell Smith delivered a "unilateral declaration" of the United States position, reiterating: "We shall seek to achieve unity through free elections supervised by the United Nations to ensure that they are conducted fairly".

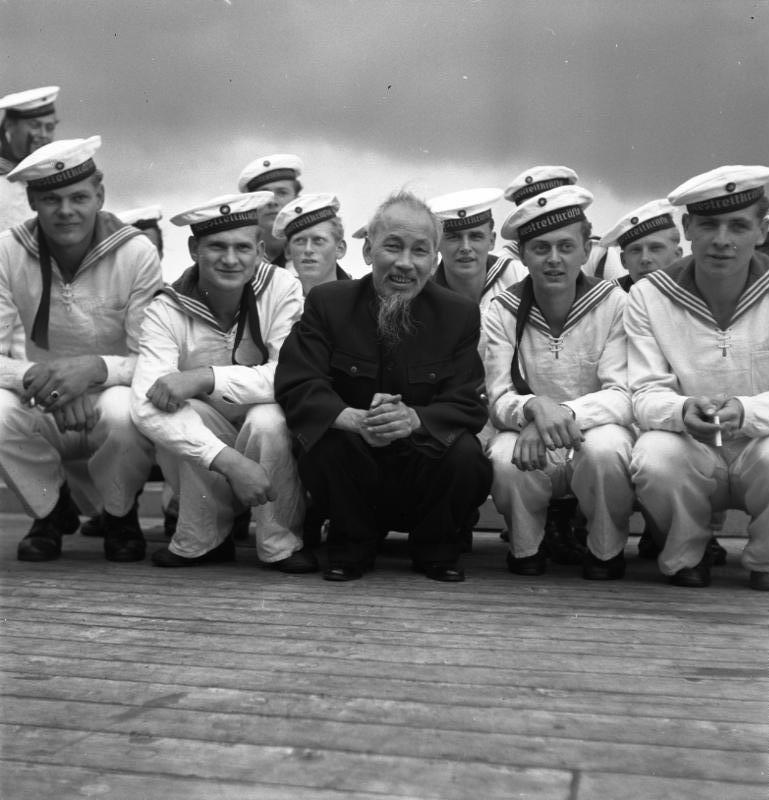
Hồ Chí Minh with East German sailors in Stralsund harbor during his 1957 visit to East Germany

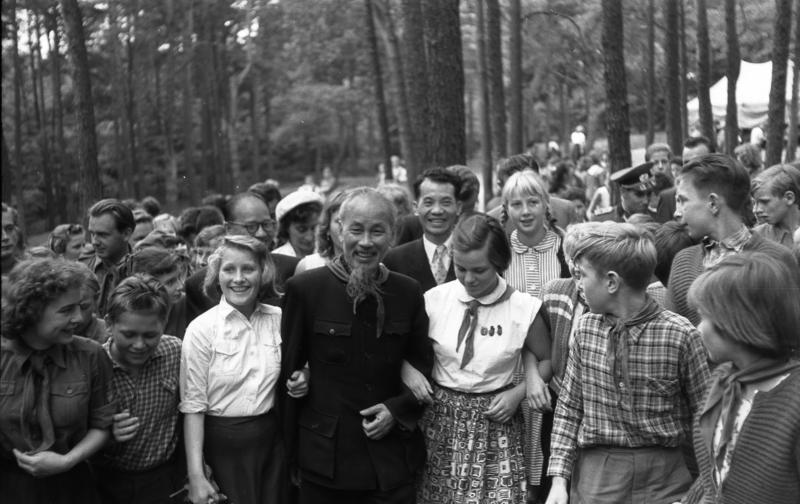
Hồ Chí Minh with members of the East German Young Pioneers near Berlin, 1957

Ho Chi Minh in Lanzhou Oil Refinery, China, August 5, 1959

Between 1953 and 1956, the North Vietnamese government instituted various agrarian reforms, including rent reduction and land reform, which were accompanied with executions of "reactionary and evil landlords." During the land reform, testimonies by North Vietnamese witnesses suggested a ratio of one execution per 160 village residents, which if extrapolated would indicate a nationwide total of nearly 100,000 executions. Because the campaign was concentrated mainly in the Red River Delta area, a lower estimate of 50,000 executions was widely accepted by scholars at the time. (Note: Dommen (2001), p.340 gives a lower estimate of 32,000 executions) However, declassified documents from the Vietnamese and Hungarian archives indicate that the number of executions was much lower than reported at the time, although it was likely greater than 13,500 including people who committed suicide following arrest. In 1973 Gareth Porter estimated 800-2,500 executions based on available official documentation, and also reported a South Vietnamese government document released in 1959, which he says is consistent with an estimate of around 1,500 executions. In 1990, economist Vo Nhan Tri reported uncovering a document in the central party archives which put the number of wrongful executions at 15,000. From discussions with party cadres, Vo Nhan Tri concluded that the overall number of deaths was considerably higher than this figure. In 2007, scholar Balázs Szalontai wrote that declassified documents of Hungarian diplomats living in North Vietnam at the time of the land reform, provided a number of the 62,182 ‘landlords’ identified by the land reform cadres, of whom 1,337 were executed by December 1955, including 1,175 executions during the first stage, which was the rent-reduction campaign, and 162 executions during the second stage, which was the land reform proper. The third stage in early 1956, likely resulted in more deaths than the previous stages as the repression was more intense.

In early 1956, North Vietnam ended the land reform and initiated a "correction of errors" to rectify the mistakes and damage done. That year, Hồ Chí Minh apologised and acknowledged the serious errors the government had made in the land reform. As part of the campaign, as many as 23,748 political prisoners were released by North Vietnam by September 1957. By 1958, the correction campaign had resulted in the return of land to many of those harmed by the land reform.

== Vietnam War ==
As early as June 1956, the idea of overthrowing the Republic of Vietnam government was presented at a Politburo meeting. In 1959, Hồ Chí Minh began urging the Politburo to send aid to the Việt Cộng in South Vietnam; a "people's war" on the South was approved at a session in January 1959, and this decision was confirmed by the Politburo in March. North Vietnam invaded Laos in July 1959, aided by the Pathet Lao, and used 30,000 men to build a network of supply and reinforcement routes running through Laos and Cambodia that became known as the Hồ Chí Minh trail. It allowed the North to send manpower and material to the Việt Cộng with much less exposure to South Vietnamese forces, achieving a considerable advantage. To counter the accusation that North Vietnam was violating the Geneva Accord, the independence of the Việt Cộng was stressed in communist propaganda. North Vietnam created the National Liberation Front of South Vietnam in December 1960 as a "united front", or political branch of the Việt Cộng, intended to encourage the participation of non-Communists.

At the end of 1959, aware that the planned national elections would never be held and that Diệm intended to purge opposing forces (mostly ex-Việt Minh) from South Vietnamese society, Hồ Chí Minh informally chose Lê Duẩn to become the next party leader. This was interpreted by Western analysts as a loss of influence for Hồ, who was said to have preferred the more moderate Võ Nguyên Giáp for the position. From 1959 onward, the elderly Hồ became increasingly worried about the prospect of his death, and that year he wrote down his will. Hồ stepped down as General Secretary of the Vietnam Communist party in September 1960 and Lê Duẩn was officially named party leader, leaving Hồ to function in a secondary role as head of state and member of the Politburo. He nevertheless maintained considerable influence in the government. Lê Duẩn, Tố Hữu, Trường Chinh and Phạm Văn Đồng often shared dinner with Hồ, and all of them remained key figures throughout and after the war. In the early 1960s, the North Vietnamese Politburo was divided into the "North First" faction which favored focusing on the economic development of North Vietnam, and the "South First" faction, which favored a guerrilla war in South Vietnam to reunite the country within the short term. Between 1961 and 1963, 40,000 Communist soldiers infiltrated South Vietnam from the North.

In 1963, Hồ purportedly corresponded with South Vietnamese President Diệm in hopes of achieving a negotiated peace. During the so-called "Maneli Affair" of 1963, a French diplomatic initiative was launched to achieve a federation of the two Vietnams, which would be neutral in the Cold War. The four principal diplomats involved in the Maneli affair were Ramchundur Goburdhun, the Indian Chief Commissioner of the ICC; Mieczysław Maneli, the Polish Commissioner to the ICC; Roger Lalouette, the French ambassador to South Vietnam; and Giovanni d'Orlandi, the Italian ambassador to South Vietnam. Maneli reported that Hồ was very interested in the signs of a split between President Diệm and President Kennedy and that his attitude was: "Our real enemies are the Americans. Get rid of them, and we can cope with Diệm and Nhu afterward". Hồ and Maneli also discussed the Ho Chi Minh Trail, which passed through officially neutral Cambodia and Laos, saying "Indochina is just one single entity".

At a meeting in Hanoi held in French, Hồ told Goburdhun that Diệm was "in his way a patriot", noting that Diệm had opposed French rule over Vietnam, and ended the meeting saying that the next time Goburdhun met Diệm "shake hands with him for me". The North Vietnamese Premier Phạm Văn Đồng, speaking on behalf of Hồ, told Maneli he was interested in the peace plan, saying that just as long as the American advisers left South Vietnam "we can agree with any Vietnamese". On 2 September 1963, Maneli met with Ngô Đình Nhu, the younger brother and right-hand man to Diệm to discuss the French peace plan. It remains unclear if the Ngo brothers were serious about the French peace plan or were merely using the possibility of accepting it to blackmail the United States into supporting them at a time when the Buddhist crisis had seriously strained relations between Saigon and Washington. Supporting the latter theory is the fact that Nhu promptly leaked his meeting with Maneli to the American columnist Joseph Alsop, who publicized it in a column entitled "Very Ugly Stuff". The possibility that the Ngo brothers might accept the peace plan contributed to the Kennedy administration's plan to support a coup against them. On 1 November 1963, a coup overthrew Diệm, who was killed the next day together with his brother.

Diệm had followed a policy of "deconstructing the state" by creating several overlapping agencies and departments that were encouraged to feud with one another to disorganize the South Vietnamese state to such an extent that he hoped that it would make a coup against him impossible. When Diệm was overthrown and killed, without any kind of arbiter between the rival arms of the South Vietnamese state, regime authority in South Vietnam promptly disintegrated. The American Defense Secretary Robert McNamara reported after visiting South Vietnam in December 1963 that "there is no organized government worthy of the name" in Saigon. At a meeting of the plenum of the Politburo in December 1963, Lê Duẩn's "South first" faction triumphed, with the Politburo passing a resolution calling for North Vietnam to complete the overthrow of the regime in Saigon as soon as possible; while the members of the "North first" faction were dismissed. As the South descended into chaos, whatever interest Hồ might have had in the French peace plan faded, as it became clear the Việt Cộng could overthrow the Saigon government. A CIA report from 1964 stated that factionalism in South Vietnam had reached "almost the point of anarchy" as various South Vietnamese leaders fought one another, making any sort of concerted effort against the Việt Cộng impossible; leading to much of the South Vietnamese countryside being rapidly taken over by communist guerilla forces.

As South Vietnam collapsed into factionalism and in-fighting while the Việt Cộng continued to win the war, it became increasingly apparent to President Lyndon Johnson that only American military intervention could save South Vietnam. Though Johnson did not wish to commit American forces until he had won the 1964 election, he decided to make his intentions clear to Hanoi. In June 1964, the "Seaborn Mission" began as J. Blair Seaborn, the Canadian commissioner to the ICC, arrived in Hanoi with a message from Johnson offering billions of American economic aid and diplomatic recognition in exchange for which North Vietnam would cease trying to overthrow the government of South Vietnam. Seaborn also warned that North Vietnam would suffer the "greatest devastation" from American bombing, saying that Johnson was seriously considering a strategic bombing campaign against North Vietnam. Little came of the backchannel of the "Seaborn Mission" as the North Vietnamese distrusted Seaborn, who pointedly was never allowed to meet Hồ.

In late 1964, the People's Army of Vietnam combat troops were sent southwest into officially neutral Laos and Cambodia. By March 1965, American combat troops began arriving in South Vietnam, first to protect the airbases around Chu Lai and Da Nang, later to take on most of the fight as "[m]ore and more American troops were put in to replace Saigon troops who could not or would not, get involved in the fighting". As fighting escalated, widespread aerial and artillery bombardment all over North Vietnam by the United States Air Force and Navy began with Operation Rolling Thunder. On 8–9 April 1965, Hồ made a secret visit to Beijing to meet Mao Zedong. It was agreed that no Chinese combat troops would enter North Vietnam unless the United States invaded North Vietnam, but that China would send support troops to North Vietnam to help maintain the infrastructure damaged by American bombing. There was deep distrust and fear of China within the North Vietnamese Politburo and the suggestion that Chinese troops, even support troops, be allowed into North Vietnam caused outrage in the Politburo. Hồ had to use all his moral authority to obtain Politburo's approval.

According to Chen Jian, during the mid-to-late 1960s, Lê Duẩn permitted 320,000 Chinese volunteers into North Vietnam to help build infrastructure for the country, thereby freeing a similar number of PAVN personnel to go south. There are no sources from Vietnam, the United States, or the Soviet Union that confirm the number of Chinese troops stationed in North Vietnam. However, the Chinese government later admitted to sending 320,000 Chinese soldiers to Vietnam during the 1960s and spent over $20 billion to support Hanoi's regular North Vietnamese Army and Việt Cộng guerrilla units.

To counter the American bombing, the entire population of North Vietnam was mobilized for the war effort, with vast teams of women being used to repair the damage to roads and bridges done by the aerial bombers, often at a speed that astonished the Americans. The bombing of North Vietnam proved to be the principal obstacle to opening peace talks, as Hồ repeatedly stated that no peace talks would be possible unless the United States unconditionally ceased bombing North Vietnam. Like many of the other leaders of the newly independent states of Asia and Africa, Hồ was extremely sensitive about threats, whether perceived or real, to his nation's independence and sovereignty. Hồ regarded the American bombing as a violation of North Vietnam's sovereignty, and he felt that to negotiate with the Americans reserving the right to bomb North Vietnam should he not behave as they wanted him to do, would diminish North Vietnam's independence.

In March 1966, a Canadian diplomat, Chester Ronning, arrived in Hanoi with an offer to use his "good offices" to begin peace talks. However, the Ronning mission foundered upon the bombing issue, as the North Vietnamese demanded an unconditional halt to the bombing, an undertaking that Johnson refused to give. In June 1966, Janusz Lewandowski, the Polish Commissioner to the ICC, was able via d'Orlandi to see Henry Cabot Lodge Jr, the American ambassador to South Vietnam, with an offer from Hồ. Hồ's offer for a "political compromise" as transmitted by Lewandowski included allowing South Vietnam to maintain its alliance with the U.S., instead of becoming neutral; having the Việt Cộng "take part" in negotiations for a coalition government, instead of being allowed to automatically enter a coalition government; and allowing a "reasonable calendar" for the withdrawal of American troops instead of an immediate withdrawal. Operation Marigold, as the Lewandowski channel came to be codenamed, almost led to American-North Vietnamese talks in Warsaw in December 1966; but such plans ultimately collapsed over the bombing issue.

In January 1967, General Nguyễn Chí Thanh, the commander of communist forces in South Vietnam, returned to Hanoi to present a plan that became the genesis of the Tet Offensive a year later. Thanh expressed much concern about the Americans invading Laos to cut the Ho Chi Minh Trail, and to preempt this possibility, urged an all-out offensive to win the war with a sudden blow. Lê' Duẩn supported Thanh's plans, which were stoutly opposed by the Defense Minister, General Võ Nguyên Giáp, who preferred to continue with guerrilla war, arguing that superior American firepower would ensure the failure of Thanh's proposed offensive. With the Politburo divided, it was agreed to study and debate the issue more.

In July 1967, Hồ Chí Minh and most of the Politburo of the Communist Party met in a high-profile conference, where they concluded that the war had fallen into a stalemate. The American military presence forced the PAVN to expend the majority of their resources on maintaining the Hồ Chí Minh trail, rather than reinforcing their comrades' ranks in the South. Hồ seems to have agreed to Thanh's offensive because he wanted to see Vietnam reunified within his lifetime, and the increasingly ailing Hồ was painfully aware that he did not have much time left. With Hồ's permission, the Việt Cộng planned a massive offensive that would commence on 31 January 1968, to take much of the South by force and deal a heavy blow to the American military. The offensive was executed at great cost and with heavy casualties on Việt Cộng's political branches and armed forces. The scope of the action shocked the world, which until then had been assured that the Communists were "on the ropes". The optimistic spin that the American military command had sustained for years was no longer credible. The bombing of North Vietnam and the Hồ Chí Minh trail was halted, and American and Vietnamese negotiators held discussions on how the war might be ended. From then on, Hồ Chí Minh and his government's strategy materialized: Hanoi's terms would eventually be accepted not by engaging in conventional warfare against the might of the United States Army, but by wearing down American resolve through a prolonged guerilla conflict.

In early 1969, Hồ suffered a heart attack and was in increasingly bad health for the rest of the year. In July 1969, Jean Sainteny, a former French official in Vietnam who knew Hồ, secretly relayed a letter written to him from President Richard Nixon. Nixon's letter proposed working together to end this "tragic war", but also warned that if North Vietnam made no concessions at the peace talks in Paris by 1 November, Nixon would resort to "measures of great consequence and force". Hồ's reply letter, which Nixon received on 30 August 1969, welcomed peace talks with the U.S. to look for a way to end the war but made no concessions, as Nixon's threats made no impression on him.

== Personal life ==
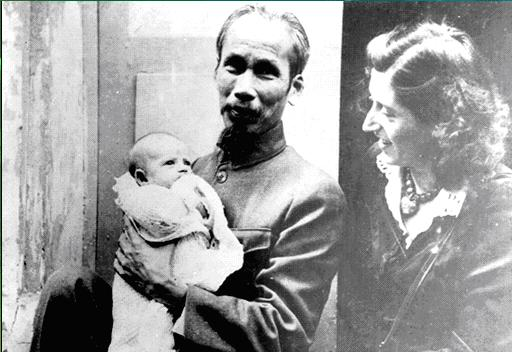
Hồ Chí Minh holding his goddaughter, baby Elizabeth (Babette) Aubrac, with Elizabeth's mother, Lucie, in 1946.

In addition to being a politician, Hồ Chí Minh was also a writer, journalist, poet and polyglot.

His father was a scholar and teacher who received a high degree in the Nguyễn dynasty's imperial examinations. Hồ was taught to master Classical Chinese at a young age. Before the August Revolution, he often wrote poetry in Chữ Hán. One of his works, Poems from the Prison Diary, was written when he was imprisoned by the police of the Republic of China. The poetry chronicle has been translated into multiple languages, recognized as one of Vietnam's national treasures since 2012 and whose works are taught in Vietnamese schools. After Vietnam gained independence from France, the new government exclusively promoted Chữ quốc ngữ (Vietnamese written in Latin characters) to eliminate illiteracy.

Hồ started to write additional poetry in modern Vietnamese for dissemination to a wider range of readers. From when he became president until the appearance of serious health problems, a short poem of his was regularly published in the Tết (Lunar new year) edition of Nhân Dân newspaper often encouraging his people to work, study or continue to fight the Americans in the new year.

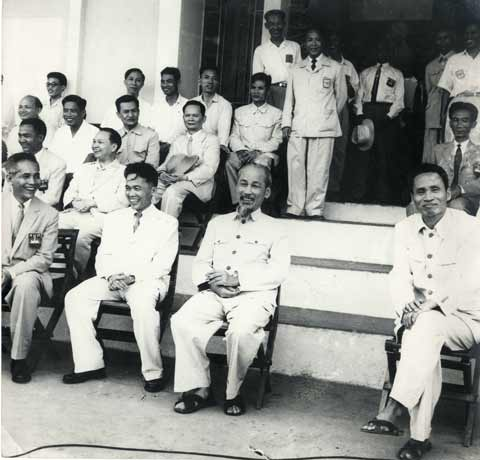
Hồ Chí Minh watching a football game in Hanoi, with his closest comrade Prime Minister Phạm Văn Đồng seated to Hồ's left. (1958)

Hồ could speak and write fluently in several languages aside from Vietnamese, including French, Russian, English, Cantonese and Mandarin. In addition, he reportedly spoke conversational Esperanto. In the 1920s, he was the bureau chief/editor of many newspapers which he had established to criticize the French colonial government of Indochina and for communist propaganda purposes. Examples are Le Paria (The Pariah), first published in 1922 Paris, and Thanh Niên (Youth), first published on the 21st of June 1925 (the date of which is now named by the current government as the Vietnam Revolutionary Press Day). In many state official visits to the Soviet Union and China, he often talked directly to their communist leaders in Russian and Mandarin without interpreters, especially about top-secret information. While being interviewed by Western journalists, he often spoke French, regardless of the language being spoken to him. He spoke Vietnamese with a strong accent from his birthplace in Nghệ An, although he could still be widely understood throughout the country. (Note: He sometimes went on-air to deliver important political messages and encourage soldiers.)

As president, he held formal receptions for foreign heads of state and ambassadors at the Presidential Palace, but he did not personally live there. He ordered the building of a stilt house at the back of the palace, which is today known as the Presidential Palace Historical Site. His hobbies (according to his secretary Vũ Kỳ) included reading, gardening, feeding fish (many of which are still living), and visiting schools and children's homes.

Hồ Chí Minh remained in Hanoi during his final years, demanding the unconditional withdrawal of all non-Vietnamese troops from South Vietnam. By 1969, with negotiations still dragging on, his health began to deteriorate from multiple health problems, including diabetes which prevented him from participating in further active politics. However, he insisted that his forces in the South continue fighting until all of Vietnam was reunited, "regardless of the length of time that it might take, believing that time was on his side".

Hồ Chí Minh is thought to have married a Chinese midwife named Zeng Xueming in October 1926. Historian Peter Neville claimed that Hồ (at the time known as Ly Thuy) wanted to engage Zeng in the communist movements, which she, however, demonstrated a lack of ability and interest in. In 1927, the mounting repression of Chiang Kai-shek's KMT against the Chinese Communists compelled Hồ to leave for Hong Kong, apparently ending his relationship with Zeng. There are a number of published studies indicating that Hồ also had a romantic relationship with Nguyễn Thị Minh Khai. As a young and high-spirited female revolutionary, Minh Khai was delegated to Hong Kong to serve as an assistant to Ho Chi Minh in April 1930 and quickly drew Hồ's attention, owing to her physical attractiveness. Hồ even approached the Far Eastern Bureau and requested permission to marry Minh Khai even though the previous marriage with Zeng remained legally valid. However, the marriage was unable to take place since Minh Khai had been detained by the British authorities in April 1931.

Hồ Chí Minh held a positive view of religions, especially Confucianism, Buddhism, and Christianity.

== Death ==
With the outcome of the Vietnam War still in question, Hồ Chí Minh died of heart failure at his home in Hanoi at 9:47 on the morning of 2 September 1969; he was 79 years old. His embalmed body is currently on display in the President Ho Chi Minh Mausoleum in Ba Đình Square in Hanoi, despite his will, which stated that he wanted to be cremated and his ashes scattered across a united Vietnam.

Due to the sensitivity of 2 September being Independence Day, the North Vietnamese government originally delayed announcing Hồ's death until 3 September. A week of mourning for his death was decreed nationwide in North Vietnam from 4 to 11 September 1969. His funeral was attended by about 250,000 people and 5,000 official guests, which included many international mourners.

Representatives from 40 countries and regions were also presented. During the mourning period, North Vietnam received more than 22,000 condolences letters from 20 organizations and 110 countries across the world, such as France, Ethiopia, Yugoslavia, Cuba, Zambia, China, the Soviet Union and many others, mostly socialist countries.

He was not initially replaced as president; instead, a collective leadership composed of several ministers and military leaders took over, known as the Politburo. During North Vietnam's final campaign in 1975, a famous song written by composer Huy Thuc was often sung by PAVN soldiers: "Bác vẫn cùng chúng cháu hành quân" ("You are still marching with us, Uncle Hồ").

During the Fall of Saigon on 30 April 1975, several PAVN tanks displayed a poster with those same words on it. The day after the battle ended, on 1 May, veteran Australian journalist Denis Warner reported that "When the North Vietnamese marched into Saigon yesterday, they were led by a man who wasn't there".

== Legacy ==
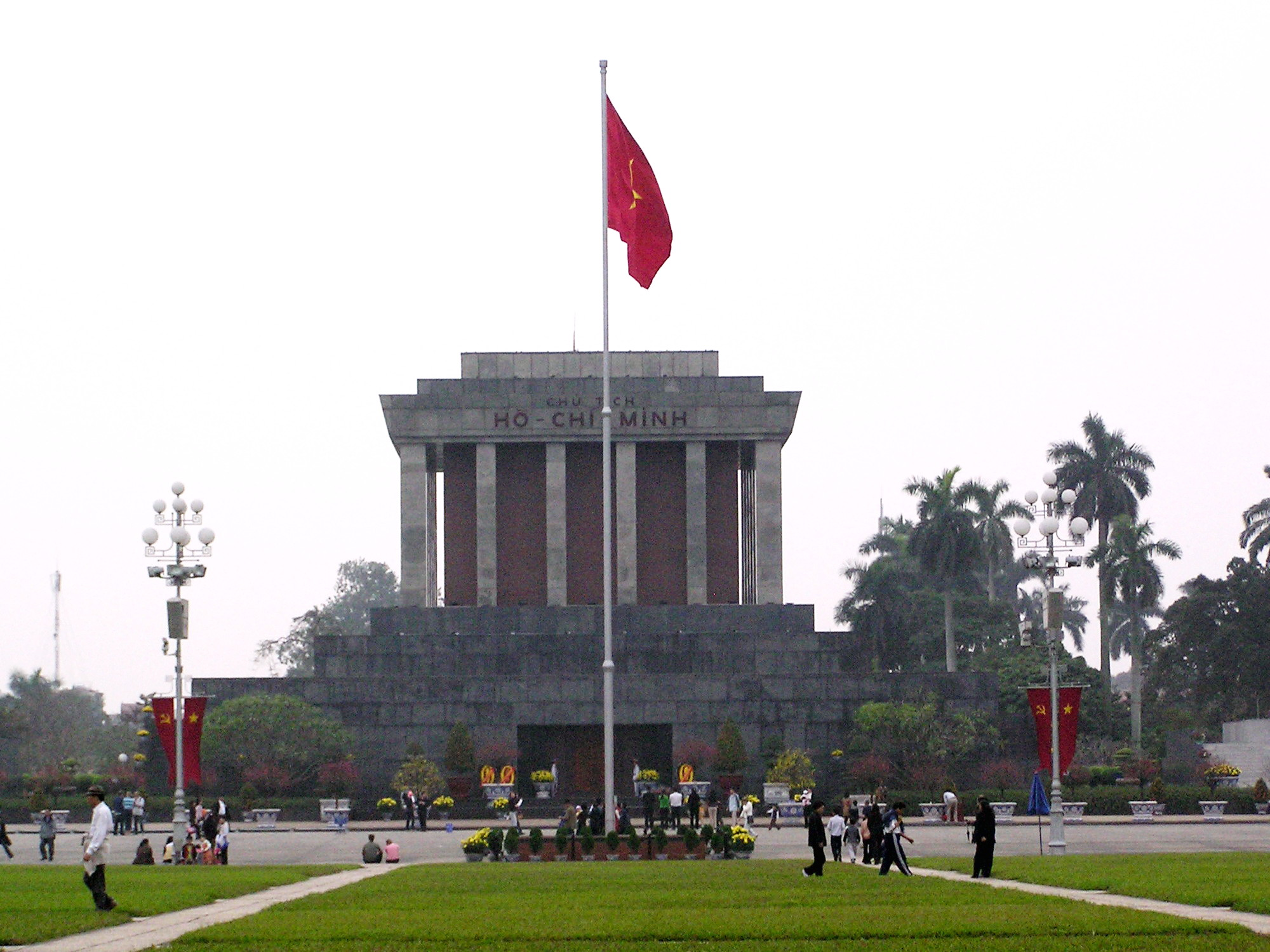
Hồ Chí Minh Mausoleum, Hanoi.

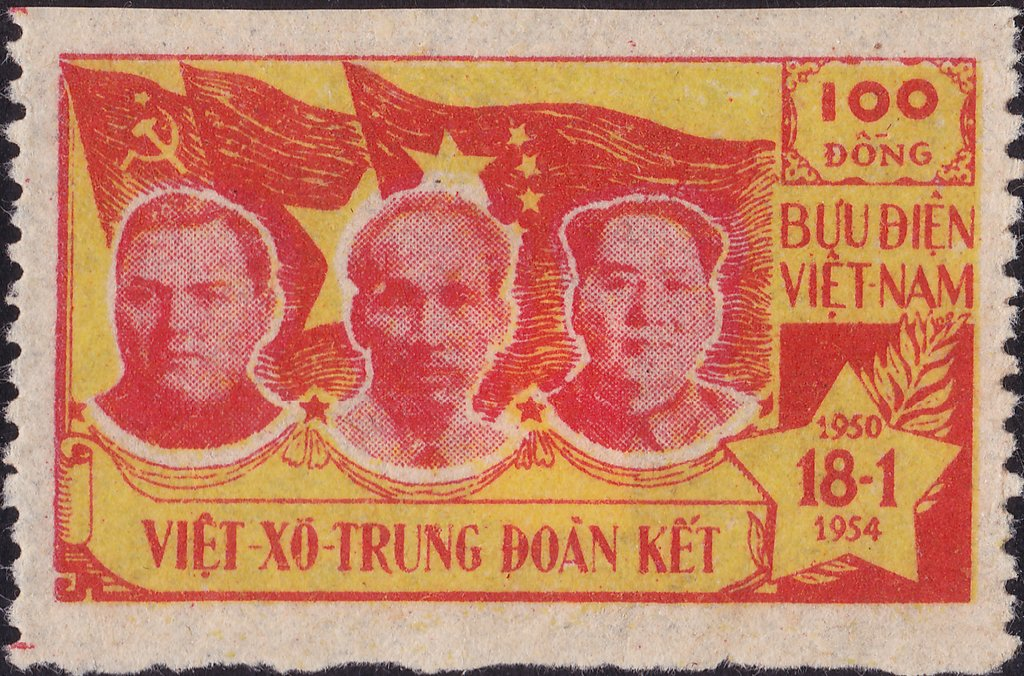
1954 postage stamp of Hồ Chí Minh with Chinese Leader Mao Zedong and Soviet Leader Georgy Malenkov.

Although Hồ Chí Minh wished for his body to be cremated and his ashes spread in North, Central, and South Vietnam, the body instead is embalmed on view in a mausoleum. His image is featured in many public buildings and schoolrooms, and other displays of reverence. There is at least one temple dedicated to him, built in then Việt Cộng-controlled Vĩnh Long shortly after his death in 1970.

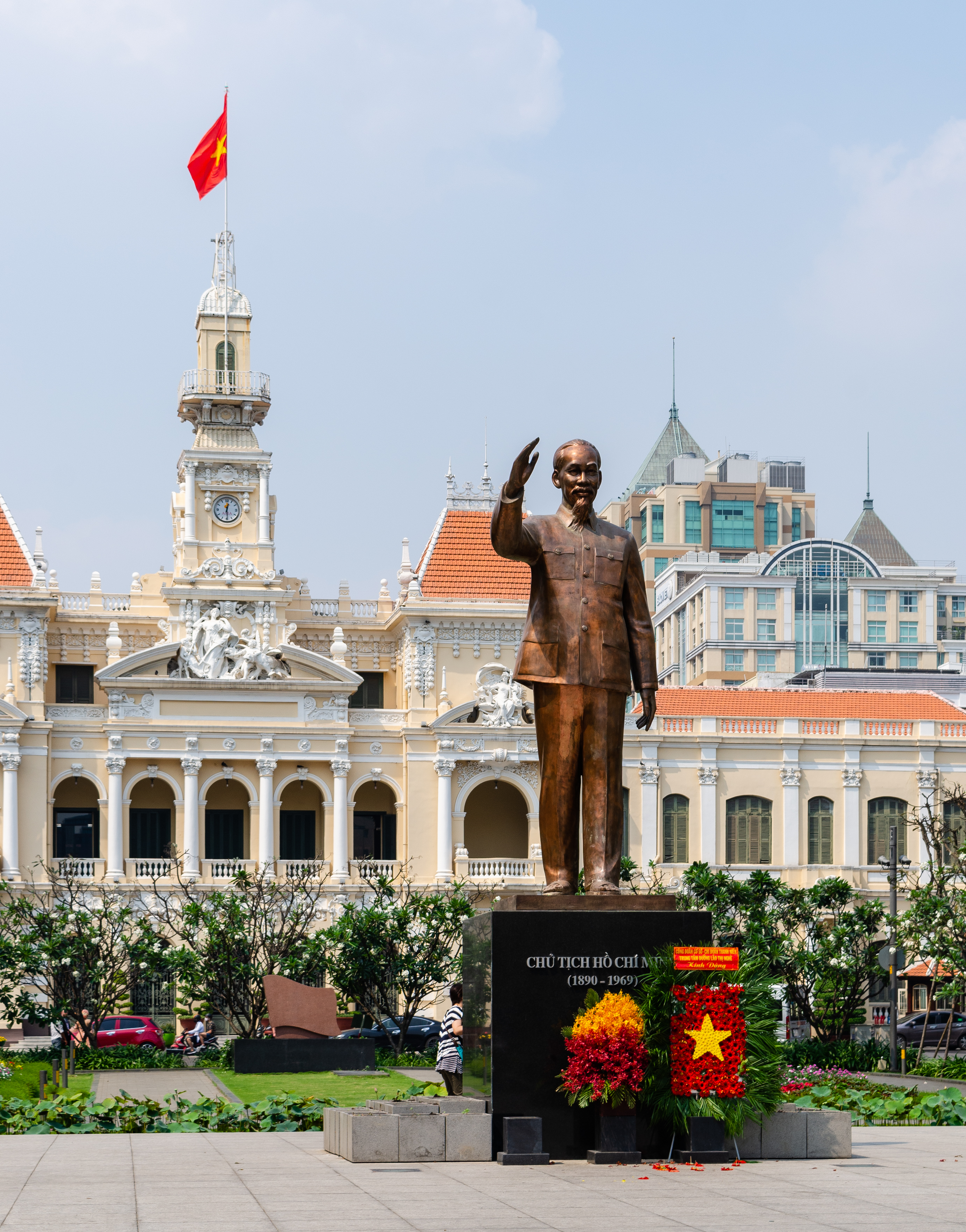
Hồ Chí Minh statue outside Hồ Chí Minh City Hall, Hồ Chí Minh City

In The Communist Road to Power in Vietnam (1982), Duiker suggests that Hồ Chí Minh's cult of personality is indicative of a larger legacy, one that drew on "elements traditional to the exercise of control and authority in Vietnamese society." Duiker is drawn to an "irresistible and persuasive" comparison with China. As in China, leading party cadres were "most likely to be intellectuals descended [like Hồ Chí Minh] from rural scholar-gentry families" in the interior (the protectorates of Annam and Tonkin). Conversely, the pioneers of constitutional nationalism tended to be from the more "Westernised" coastal south (Saigon and surrounding French direct-rule Cochinchina) and to be from "commercial families without a traditional Confucian background".

In Vietnam, as in China, Communism presented itself as a root and branch rejection of Confucianism, condemned for its ritualism, inherent conservatism, and resistance to change. Once in power, the Vietnamese Communists may not have fought Confucianism "as bitterly as did their Chinese counterparts", but its social prestige was "essentially destroyed." In the political sphere, the puppet son of heaven (which had been weakly represented by the Bảo Đại) was replaced by the people's republic. Orthodox materialism accorded no place to heaven, gods, or other supernatural forces. Socialist collectivism undermined the tradition of the Confucian family leader (Gia Truong). The socialist conception of social equality destroyed the Confucian views of class. According to the Ho Chi Minh Museum, Hồ also contributed to the cause of women's liberation.

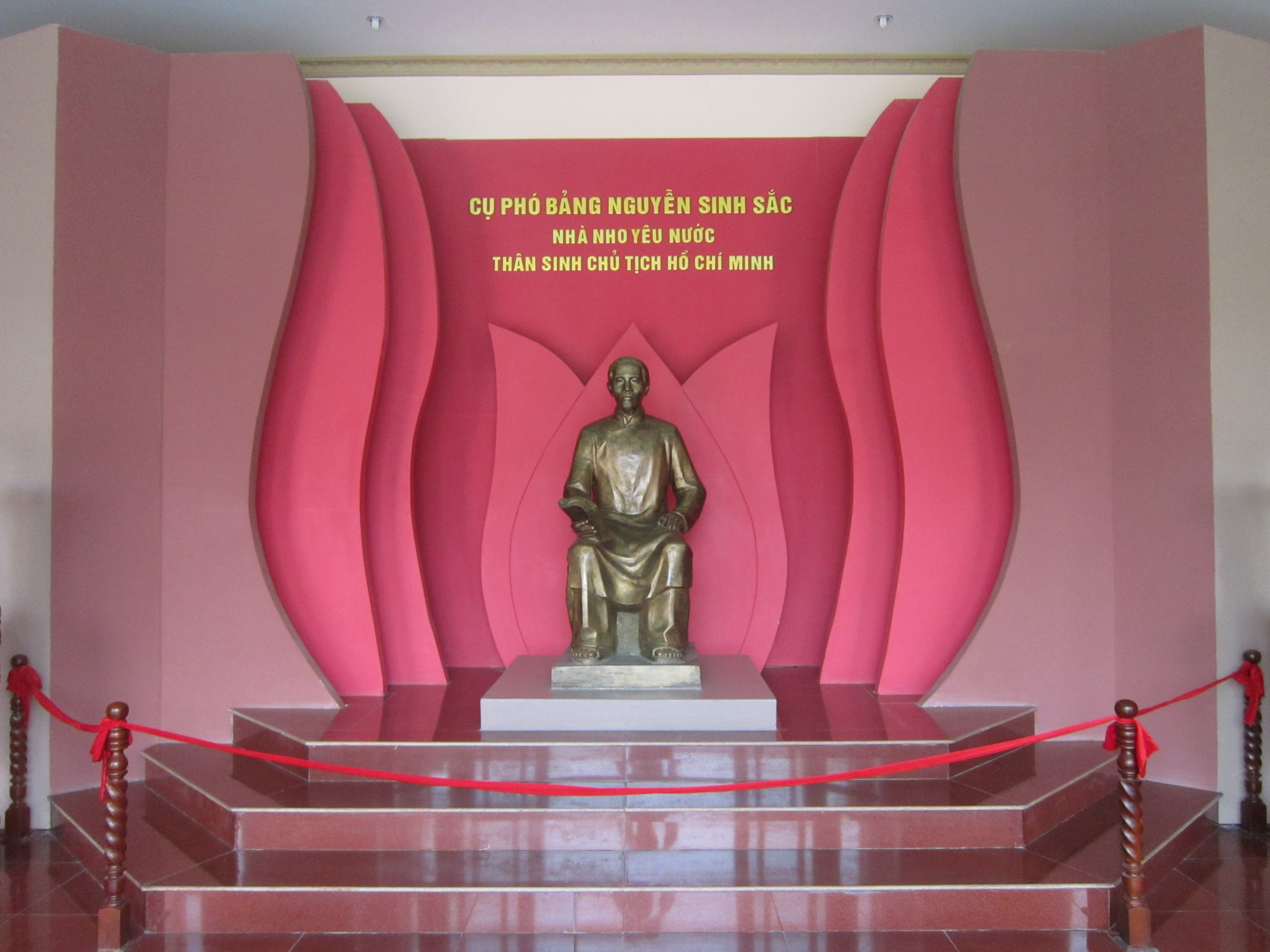
Temple devoted to Nguyễn Sinh Sắc, Hồ Chí Minh's father

Duiker argues many were to find the new ideology "congenial" precisely because of its similarities with the teachings of the old Master: "the belief in one truth, embodied in quasi-sacred texts"; in "an anointed elite, trained in an all-embracing doctrine and responsible for leading the broad masses and indoctrinating them in proper thought and behavior"; in "the subordination of the individual to the community"; and in the perfectibility, through corrective action, of human nature. All of this, Duiker suggests, was in some manner present in the aura of the new Master, Chi Minh, "the bringer of light", "Uncle Hồ" to whom "all the desirable qualities of Confucian ethics" are ascribed. Under Hồ Chí Minh, Vietnamese Marxism developed, in effect, as a kind of "reformed Confucianism" revised to meet "the challenges of the modern era" and, not least among these, of "total mobilization in the struggle for national independence and state power."

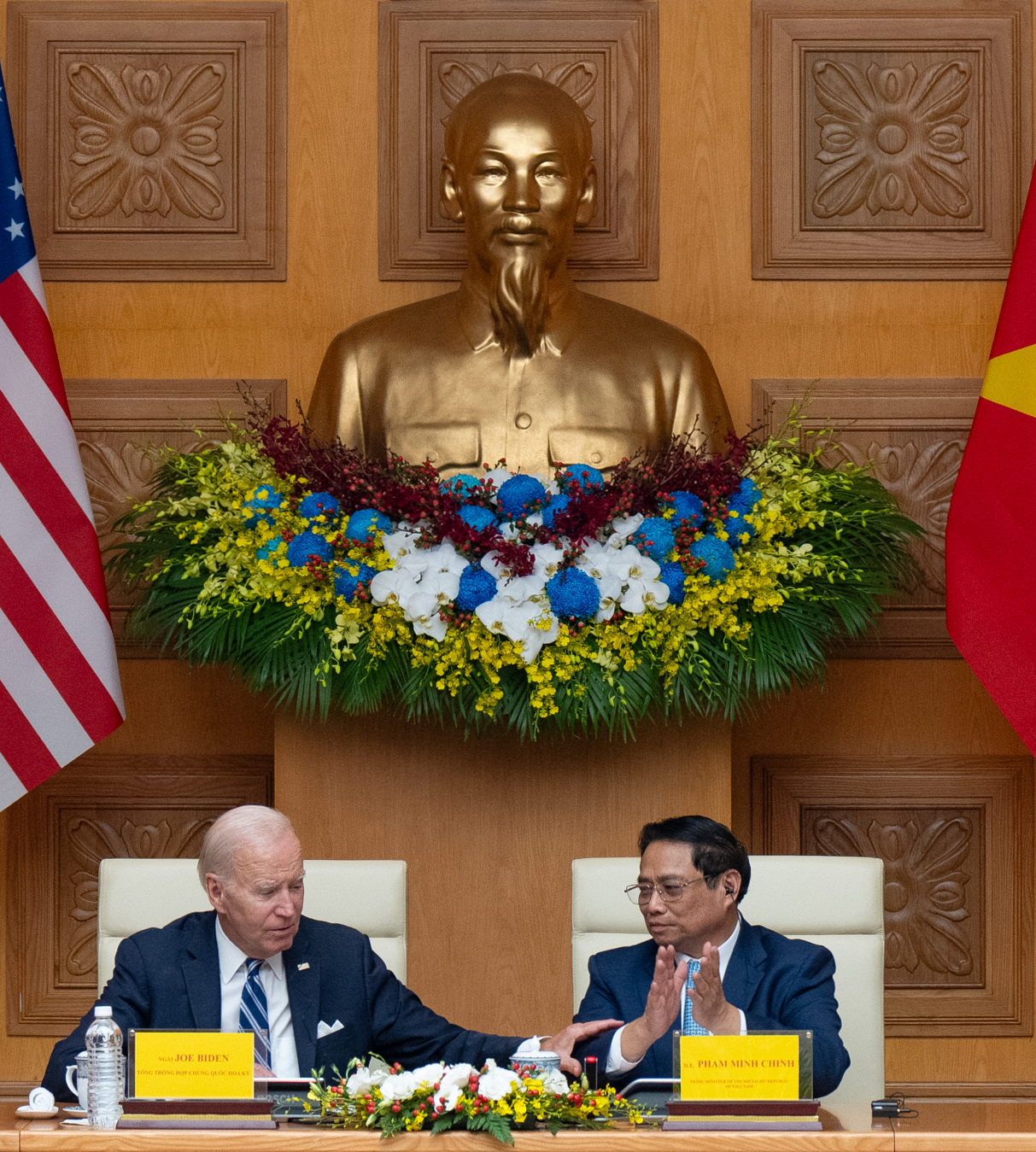
U.S. President Joe Biden with Vietnamese Prime Minister Phạm Minh Chính in front of a statue of Hồ Chí Minh in Hanoi, September 2023

This "congeniality" with Confucian tradition was remarked on by Nguyen Khac Vien, a leading Hanoi intellectual of the 1960s and 70s. In "Confucianism and Marxism in Vietnam" Nguyen Khac Vien, saw definite parallels between Confucian and party discipline, between the traditional scholar gentry and Hồ Chí Minh's party cadres.

A completely different form of the cult of Hồ Chí Minh (and one tolerated by the government with uneasiness) is his identification in Vietnamese folk religion with the Jade Emperor, who supposedly incarnated again on earth as Hồ Chí Minh. Today, Hồ Chí Minh as the Jade Emperor is supposed to speak from the spirit world through Spiritualist mediums. The first such medium was one Madam Lang in the 1990s, but the cult acquired a significant number of followers through another medium, Madam Xoan. She established on 1 January 2001 the Đạo Ngọc Phật Hồ Chí Minh (the Way of Hồ Chí Minh as the Jade Buddha), also known as Đạo Bác Hồ (the Way of Uncle Hồ) at đền Hòa Bình (the Peace Temple) in Chí Linh-Sao Đỏ district of Hải Dương province. She then founded the Peace Society of Heavenly Mediums (Đoàn đồng thiên Hòa Bình). Reportedly, the movement had around 24,000 followers by 2014.

The Vietnamese government's attempts to immortalize Hồ Chí Minh were also met with significant controversies and opposition. The regime is sensitive to anything that might question the official hagiography. This includes references to Hồ Chí Minh's personal life that might detract from the image of the dedicated "father of the revolution", the "celibate married only to the cause of revolution". William Duiker's Ho Chi Minh: A Life (2000) was candid on the matter of Hồ Chí Minh's liaisons. The government sought cuts in the Vietnamese translation and banned distribution of an issue of the Far Eastern Economic Review, which carried a small item about the controversy.

Many authors writing on Vietnam argued on the question of whether Hồ Chí Minh was fundamentally a nationalist or a communist. Recent scholarship has demonstrated Hồ's longstanding commitment to communist ideology. Official historiography in Vietnam criticizes interpretations that portray Hồ as merely a nationalist rather than as a dedicated Marxist–Leninist revolutionary.

=== Depictions of Hồ Chí Minh ===
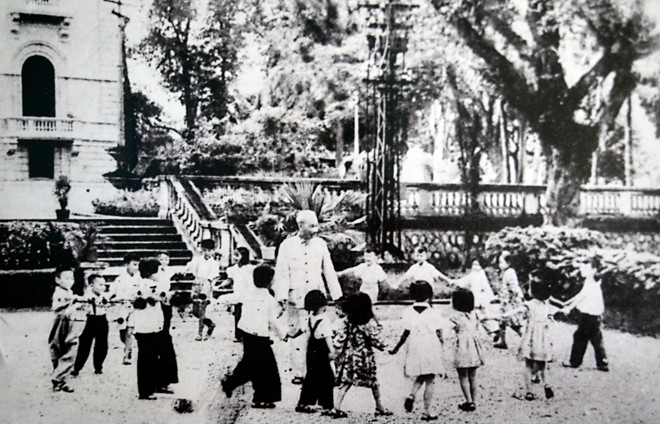
Ho Chí Minh pictured with children in a photo by state media

Busts, statues, and memorial plaques and exhibitions are displayed in destinations on his extensive world journey in exile from 1911 to 1941 including France, the United Kingdom, Russia, China, and Thailand.

Many activists and musicians wrote songs about Hồ Chí Minh and his revolution in different languages during the Vietnam War to demonstrate against the United States. Spanish songs were composed by Félix Pita Rodríguez, Carlos Puebla and Alí Primera. In addition, the Chilean folk singer Víctor Jara referenced Hồ Chí Minh in his anti-war song "El derecho de vivir en paz" ("The Right to Live in Peace"). Pete Seeger wrote "Teacher Uncle Ho". Ewan MacColl produced "The Ballad of Ho Chi Minh" in 1954, describing "a man who is the father of the Indo-Chinese people, And his name [it] is Ho Chi Minh." Russian songs about him were written by Vladimir Fere, and German songs about him were written by Kurt Demmler.

Various places, boulevards, and squares are named after him around the world, especially in Socialist states and former Communist states. In Russia, there is a Hồ Chí Minh square and monument in Moscow, a Hồ Chí Minh boulevard in Saint Petersburg, and a Hồ Chí Minh square in Ulyanovsk (the birthplace of Vladimir Lenin, a sister city of Vinh, the birthplace of Hồ Chí Minh). During the Vietnam War, the then-West Bengal government, in the hands of CPI(M), renamed Harrington Street to Ho Chi Minh Sarani, which is also the location of the consulate general of the United States in Kolkata. According to the Vietnamese Ministry of Foreign Affairs, as many as 20 countries across Asia, Europe, America and Africa have erected monuments or statues in remembrance of Hồ Chí Minh.

== International influence ==
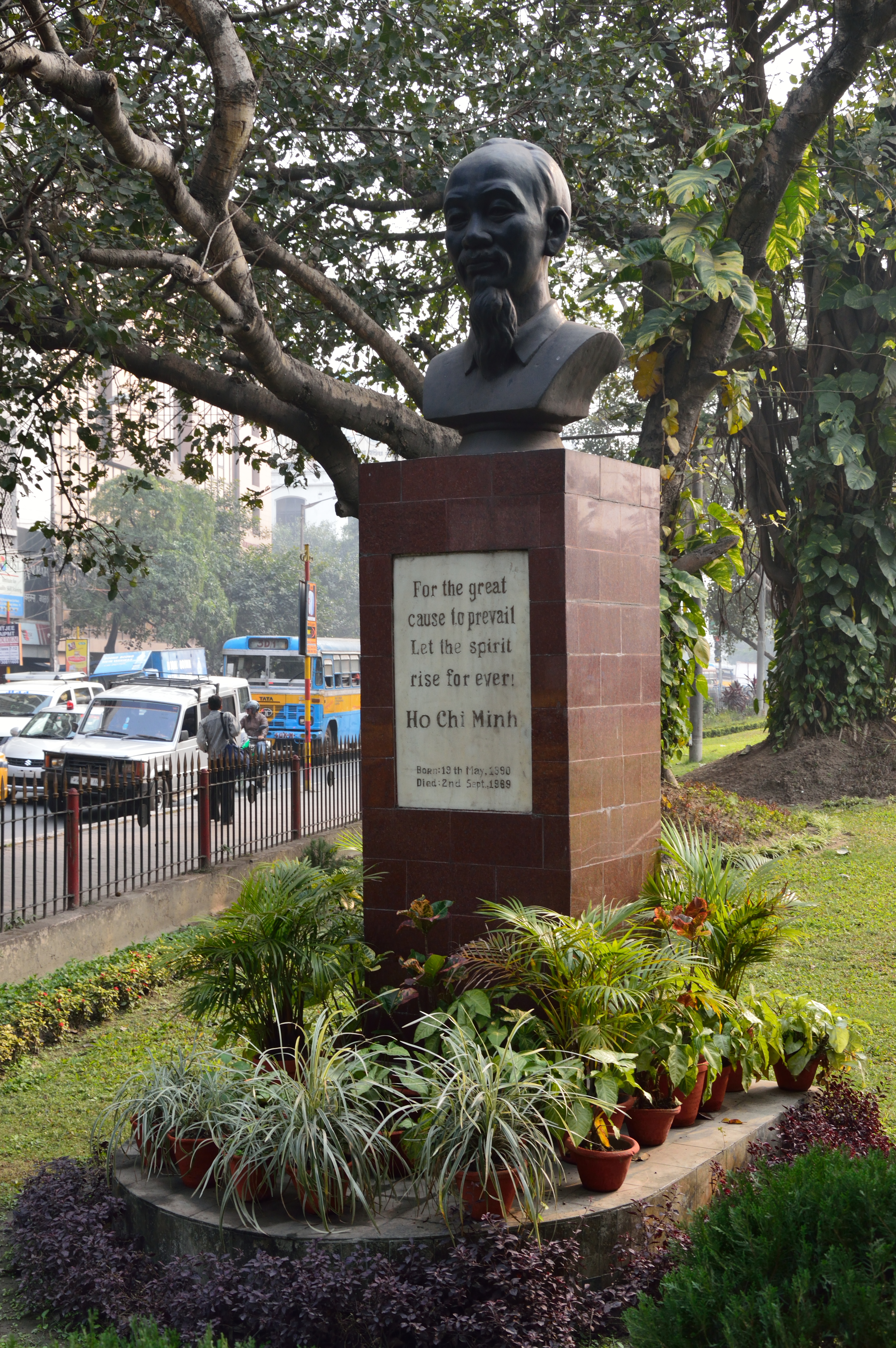
Hồ Chí Minh bust in Kolkata, India

Hồ Chí Minh is considered one of the most influential leaders in the world. Time magazine listed him in the list of 100 Most Important People of the Twentieth Century (Time 100) in 1998. His thought and revolution inspired many leaders and people on a global scale in Asia, Africa and Latin America during the decolonization movement which occurred after World War II. As a communist, he was one of the few international figures who were relatively well regarded in the West, and did not face the same extent of international criticism as much as other Communist rulers and factions, even winning praise for his actions.

In 1987, UNESCO officially recommended that its member states "join in the commemoration of the centenary of the birth of President Hồ Chí Minh by organizing various events as a tribute to his memory", considering "the important and many-sided contributions of President Hồ Chí Minh to the fields of culture, education and the arts" who "devoted his whole life to the national liberation of the Vietnamese people, contributing to the common struggle of peoples for peace, national independence, democracy, and social progress".

One of Hồ Chí Minh's works, The Black Race, much of it originally written in French, highlights his views on the oppression of peoples from colonialism and imperialism in 20 written articles. Other books such as Revolution which published selected works and articles of Hồ Chí Minh in English also highlighted Hồ Chí Minh's interpretation and beliefs in socialism and communism, and in fighting against what he perceived to be evils stemming from capitalism, colonialism, and imperialism.

== See also ==
- Communism in Vietnam
- First Indochina War
- Vietnam War

== Explanatory notes ==
Political offices
Preceded by Bảo Đại as Emperor	President of North Vietnam; January 1946 – 2 September 1969	Succeeded by Tôn Đức Thắng
Preceded by Trần Trọng Kim as Prime Minister of the Empire of Vietnam	Prime Minister of North Vietnam; 2 September 1945 – 20 September 1955	Succeeded by Phạm Văn Đồng
Party political offices
Preceded by New title	Chairman of the Workers' Party of Vietnam; 1951–1969	Succeeded by None
Preceded by Trường Chinh	First Secretary of the Workers' Party of Vietnam; 1956–1960	Succeeded by Lê Duẩn
