= Kim Liên, Nghệ An =

Kim Liên
- Commune
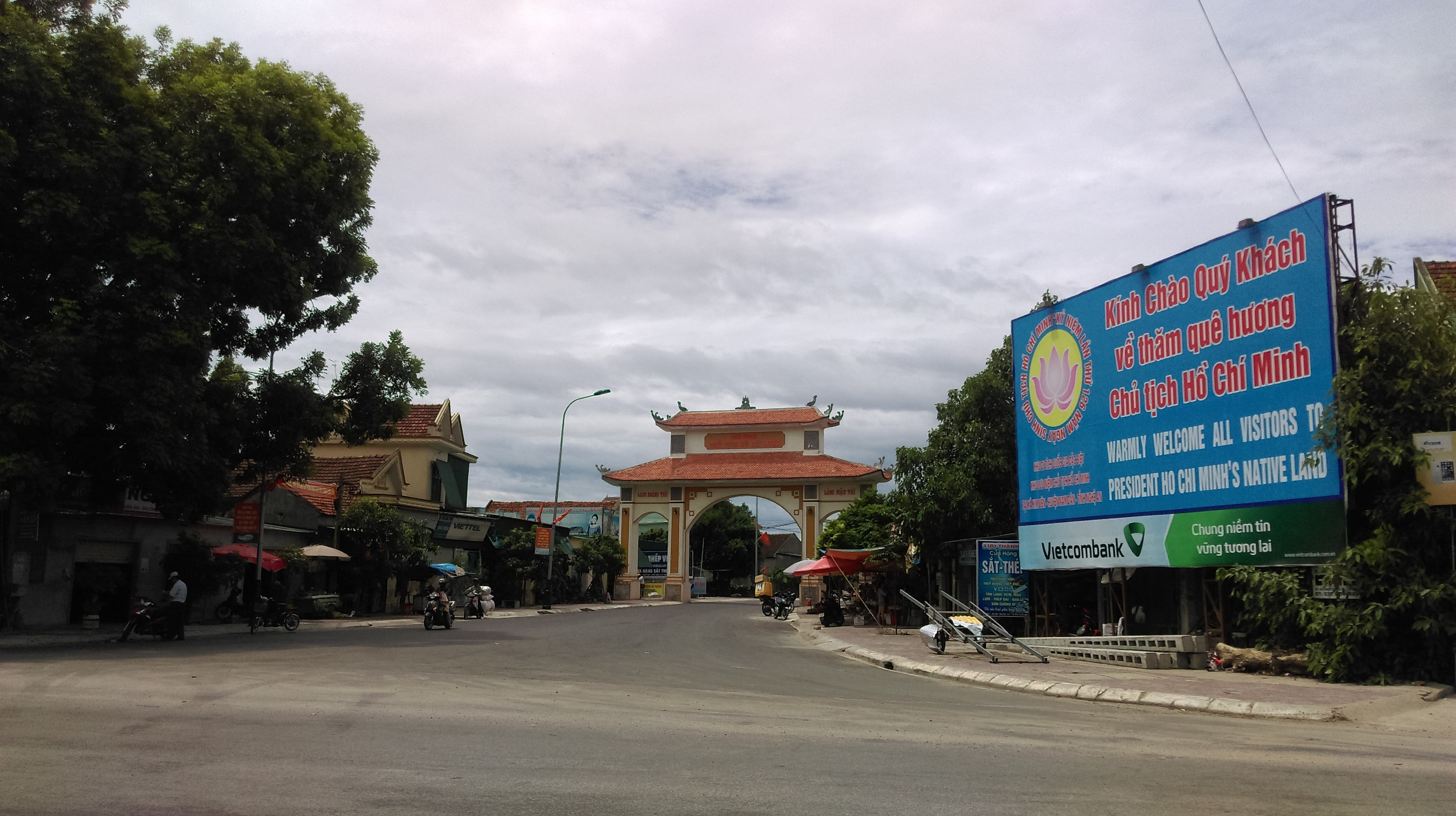
- Welcome gates of Hoàng Trù village and Mậu Tài village

- Location in Vietnam
- Coordinates: 18°53′N 105°19′E
- Country: Vietnam
- Province: Nghệ An Province

Population (2025)
  - Total: 24,489

Kim Liên is a large village and commune in the Nghệ An Province in Vietnam. Kim Liên is the childhood home of former president Ho Chi Minh and his parents' house there is the site of the Kim Liên museum. The village is also called Làng Sen.

== History ==
The name of the village means "Gold-Lilly", and the district "South-Sandalwood" in Sino-Vietnamese characters (南檀, 金莲).
