= List of spouses of Vietnamese leaders =

There have been a number of spouses of the General Secretaries of the Communist Party (Vietnamese: Phu nhân Tổng bí thư) and spouses of the Presidents of Vietnam (Vietnamese: Phu nhân Chủ tịch nước).

These roles were never established or recognized as an official title or office, but their holders often played an important ceremonial role alongside the officeholder. Depending on the prominence of the officeholder and their spouse, the latter may be informally referred to as the First Lady of Vietnam (Vietnamese: Đệ nhất Phu nhân Việt Nam). Ngô Phương Ly has been considered the de facto First Lady of Vietnam since Tô Lâm's election as General Secretary in August 2024.

== Spouses of the General Secretary of the Communist Party of Vietnam ==
Spouse of the General Secretary of the Communist Party of Vietnam
- Incumbent; Ngô Phương Ly since 3 August 2024
- Style: Her Excellency; Madam
- Status: de facto
- Residence: 64 Phan Đình Phùng street, Ba Đình, Hanoi
- Unofficial names: First Lady of Vietnam

The highest position in Vietnam's political system is the General Secretary of the Communist Party of Vietnam and the spouse of the officeholder is considered the de facto "First Lady of Vietnam".

The list only includes spouses of General Secretaries who served after the 1951 re-establishment of the Worker's Party of Vietnam (predecessor of the Communist Party of Vietnam), following which it formally became the ruling party of North Vietnam and later reunified Vietnam.

No.	Portrait	Name (Birth–Death)	Tenure began	Tenure ended	General Secretary
1		Nguyễn Thị Minh (1912–2001)	19 February 1951	5 October 1956	Trường Chinh
–	Vacant (Note: Tăng Tuyết Minh was allegedly married to Hồ Chí Minh in 1926 but the pair was separated in 1927 when Hồ went into hiding following the anti-communist coup in Shanghai)		5 October 1956	10 September 1960	Hồ Chí Minh
2		Lê Thị Sương (?–?)	10 September 1960	10 July 1986	Lê Duẩn
–		Nguyễn Thụy Nga (Note: Lê Duẩn married vi:Nguyễn Thụy Nga in 1950 during his revolutionary leadership in the south despite having previously married to Lê Thị Sương in 1929) (1925–2018)	10 September 1960	10 July 1986	Lê Duẩn
(1)		Nguyễn Thị Minh (1912–2001)	14 July 1986	18 December 1986	Trường Chinh
3		Ngô Thị Huệ (1918–2022)	18 December 1986	28 June 1991	Nguyễn Văn Linh
4		Tạ Thị Thanh (?–?)	28 June 1991	26 December 1997	Đỗ Mười
5		Nguyễn Thị Bích (?–?)	26 December 1997	22 April 2001	Lê Khả Phiêu
6		Lý Thị Bang (1942-2010)	22 April 2001	24 October 2010†	Nông Đức Mạnh
–	Vacant		24 October 2010	19 January 2011	Nông Đức Mạnh
7		Ngô Thị Mân 1949 –	19 January 2011	19 July 2024	Nguyễn Phú Trọng
8		Ngô Phương Ly 1970 –	3 August 2024	Incumbent	Nguyễn Phú Trọng
8		Ngô Phương Ly 1970 –	3 August 2024	Incumbent	Tô Lâm

== Spouses of the Presidents of Vietnam ==
Spouse of the president of the Socialist Republic of Vietnam
- Incumbent; Ngô Phương Ly since 7 April 2026
- Style: Her Excellency; Madam
- Status: de facto
- Residence: Presidential Palace, Hanoi
- Inaugural holder: Đoàn Thị Giàu
- Formation: 2 September 1969; 57 years ago
- Unofficial names: First Lady of Vietnam
- Salary: Undisclosed
- Website: Office of the President

There have been 12 (Note: Not including the two first ladies of South Vietnam) people holding this title since 1969. (Note: Hồ Chí Minh, the first president (1945-1969), was a bachelor during his presidency.) The current spouse of the president since April 2026 is Ngô Phương Ly, the wife of incumbent President Tô Lâm.

The role of the president's spouse is not an official position, and so they are not given a salary or official duties. Nonetheless, the spouse usually participates in humanitarian and charitable work, and accompanies the president in state visits and entertaining foreign leaders.

No.	Portrait	Name	Tenure began	Tenure ended	President
Spouses of the president of the Democratic Republic of Vietnam
—	Vacant (Note: Tăng Tuyết Minh was allegedly married to Hồ Chí Minh in 1926 but the pair was separated in 1927 when Hồ went into hiding following the anti-communist coup in Shanghai)		2 September 1945	2 September 1969	Hồ Chí Minh
—		Nguyễn Thị Sắt; 1881 – 1953	29 May 1946	21 October 1946	Huỳnh Thúc Kháng (Acting)
1		Đoàn Thị Giàu; 1898 – 1974	2 September 1969	25 May 1974†	Tôn Đức Thắng
—	Vacant		25 May 1974	2 July 1976	Tôn Đức Thắng
Spouses of the president of the Socialist Republic of Vietnam
—	Vacant		2 July 1976	30 March 1980	Tôn Đức Thắng
—		Dương Thị Chung; 1922 – 2018	30 March 1980	4 July 1981	Nguyễn Hữu Thọ
Spouses of the chairman of the Council of State of the Socialist Republic of Vietnam
2		Nguyễn Thị Minh; 1912 – ?	4 July 1981	18 June 1987	Trường Chinh
3		Phan Thị Nể ? – ?	18 June 1987	22 September 1992	Võ Chí Công
Spouses of the president of the Socialist Republic of Vietnam
4		Võ Thị Lê; 1928 – 2016	23 September 1992	24 September 1997	Lê Đức Anh
5		Nguyễn Thị Vinh ? –	24 September 1997	27 June 2006	Trần Đức Lương
6		Trần Thị Kim Chi ? –	27 June 2006	25 July 2011	Nguyễn Minh Triết
7		Mai Thị Hạnh; 1956 –	25 July 2011	2 April 2016	Trương Tấn Sang
8		Nguyễn Thị Hiền; 1958 –	2 April 2016	21 September 2018	Trần Đại Quang†
—	Vacant (Note: The spouse of the vice president never appeared publicly during her acting presidency)		21 September 2018	23 October 2018	Đặng Thị Ngọc Thịnh (Acting)
9		Ngô Thị Mân; 1949 –	23 October 2018	5 April 2021	Nguyễn Phú Trọng
10		Trần Thị Nguyệt Thu; 1956 –	5 April 2021	18 January 2023	Nguyễn Xuân Phúc
—	Vacant (Note: The spouse of the vice president never appeared publicly during her acting presidency)		18 January 2023	2 March 2023	Võ Thị Ánh Xuân (Acting)
11		Phan Thị Thanh Tâm; 1976 –	2 March 2023	21 March 2024	Võ Văn Thưởng
—	Vacant (Note: The spouse of the vice president never appeared publicly during her acting presidency)		21 March 2024	22 May 2024	Võ Thị Ánh Xuân (Acting)
12		Ngô Phương Ly; 1970 –	22 May 2024	21 October 2024	Tô Lâm
13		Nguyễn Thị Minh Nguyệt ? –	21 October 2024	7 April 2026	Lương Cường
14		Ngô Phương Ly; 1970 –	7 April 2026	Incumbent	Tô Lâm

== Historical ==
=== First Lady of South Vietnam ===
First Lady of South Vietnam
- Residence: Independence Palace, Saigon (now Ho Chi Minh City)
- Inaugural holder: Trần Lệ Xuân
- Formation: 26 October 1955; 71 years ago
- Abolished: 30 April 1975; 51 years ago

The spouse of the President of South Vietnam is informally referred to as the First Lady. (Note: Madame Nhu was the wife of Ngô Đình Nhu, who was the brother and chief advisor to President Ngô Đình Diệm. Since Diệm was a lifelong bachelor, Madame Nhu assumed the de facto first lady title.)

No.	Portrait	Name	Tenure began	Tenure ended	President
1		Trần Lệ Xuân (Note: Madame Nhu was the wife of Ngô Đình Nhu, who was the brother and chief advisor to President Ngô Đình Diệm. Since Diệm was a lifelong bachelor, Madame Nhu assumed the de facto first lady title.); Madame Nhu; 1924 – 2011	26 October 1955	2 November 1963	Ngô Đình Diệm
—	Vacant		2 November 1963	31 October 1967	Military junta
2		Nguyễn Thị Mai Anh; Madame Nguyễn Văn Thiệu; 1930 – 2021	31 October 1967	21 April 1975	Nguyễn Văn Thiệu
3		Lưu Thị Triệu; Madame Trần Văn Hương; 1900 – ?	21 April 1975	28 April 1975	Trần Văn Hương
—	Vacant		28 April 1975	30 April 1975	Dương Văn Minh

Second Lady of South Vietnam
- Residence: Independence Palace, Saigon (now Ho Chi Minh City)
- Inaugural holder: Đặng Tuyết Mai
- Formation: 31 October 1967; 59 years ago
- Abolished: 30 April 1975; 51 years ago

=== Second Lady of South Vietnam ===
The spouse of the Vice President of South Vietnam is informally referred to as the Second Lady.

No.	Portrait	Name	Tenure began	Tenure ended	Vice President
—	Vacant		18 December 1956	2 November 1963	Nguyễn Ngọc Thơ
—	Vacant		2 November 1963	31 October 1967	Military junta
1		Đặng Tuyết Mai; Madame Nguyễn Cao Kỳ; 1941 – 2016	31 October 1967	29 October 1971	Nguyễn Cao Kỳ
2		Lưu Thị Triệu; Madame Trần Văn Hương; 1900 – ?	31 October 1971	21 April 1975	Trần Văn Hương
—	Vacant		21 April 1975	30 April 1975	Nguyễn Văn Huyền

== See also ==
- List of presidents of Vietnam
- President of Vietnam
- Category:Spouses of Vietnamese presidents
