= Mai Thị Hạnh =

Former First Lady of Vietnam

Madame Mai Thị Hạnh
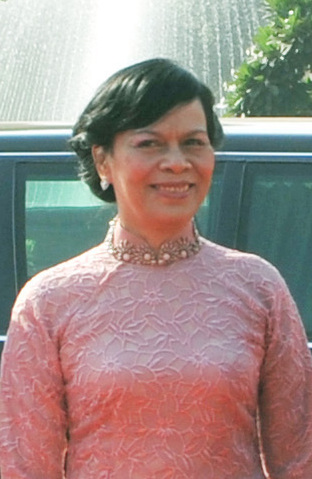
- Madame Hạnh during a state visit to India in 2011

Spouse of the President of Vietnam
- In role 25 July 2011 – 2 April 2016
- President: Trương Tấn Sang
- Preceded by: Trần Thị Kim Chi
- Succeeded by: Nguyễn Thị Hiền

Personal details
- Born: 1956 (age 69–70) Hải Phòng Province, Vietnam
- Spouse: Trương Tấn Sang

Mai Thị Hạnh (Vietnamese pronunciation: [maːj˧˧ tʰi˧˨ʔ hajŋ̟˧˨ʔ]; born 1956) is the spouse of the former President of Vietnam Trương Tấn Sang from 2011 to 2016. Since her husband's retirement from politics following the 12th National Congress, Hạnh has been known for her philanthropy.

Unofficial titles
Preceded by Trần Thị Kim Chi	Spouse of the President of Vietnam; 2011–2016	Succeeded by Nguyễn Thị Hiền
