= Ibnu Hadi =

Indonesian diplomat (born 1960)

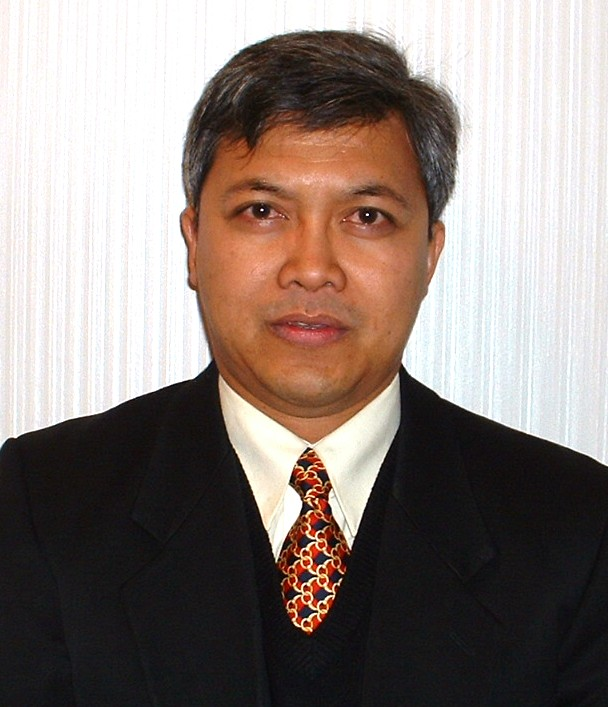

Ambassador of Indonesia to Vietnam
- In office 23 December 2015 – 14 December 2020
- President: Joko Widodo
- Preceded by: Mayerfas
- Succeeded by: Denny Abdi

Personal details
- Born: May 26, 1960 (age 66) Belakang Padang, Batam, Riau, Indonesia
- Spouse: Dyah Prastyawati Hadi
- Children: 3
- Education: University of Indonesia (S.E.); Macquarie University (M.Ec.)

Ibnu Hadi (born 26 May 1960) is an Indonesian diplomat who last served as ambassador to Vietnam from 2016 to 2020. Previously, he served in a number of roles in the foreign ministry and abroad, including as consul general in Osaka from 2010 to 2013 and director of North and Central America from 2013 to 2016.

== Early life and education ==
Ibnu Hadi was born in Belakang Padang, an island located in Batam on 26 May 1960 as the third of seven siblings. His father worked for the immigration, which necessitated the family to move frequently, typically every four to five years. At the time of his birth, his father was being assigned as an immigration officer in the island. As a child, Ibnu heard stories about the island from his father, including the island being the center of a smuggling hub and the stopover for pirates. After four years in the island, his father was transferred to Jakarta. He spent most of his childhood in Jakarta, as well as in Makassar and Semarang.

Ibnu studied at public schools. Despite majoring in science in high school, he personally chose to study economics, as he felt the major combined social and natural subject. He pursued the major at the University of Indonesia, graduating with a bachelor's degree in 1986. He pursued his master's degree on the same subject at the Macquarie University, which he completed in 1990. During his studies, he observed that the Australian university's teaching methods, though using similar materials to those at the University of Indonesia, were more interactive and discussion-heavy.

== Diplomatic career ==
Ibnu began his diplomatic service in 1986. He was inspired to become a diplomat due to his childhood fascination with geography, atlases, and encyclopedias. His first overseas assignment was in 1991 after he received his master's degree, where he served as a vice consul for economic affairs at the consulate general in Hong Kong until 1994. From his time in Hong Kong, he noted the high work ethic and strict adherence to time, contrasting it with a perceived slower pace in Indonesia. Following this, he was posted at the foreign department as deputy director (chief of subdirectorate) for finance and investment cooperation from 1994 to 1996.

Ibnu was then posted at the consulate general in Osaka as consul for economic affairs 1996 to 2000. He described the posting as his toughest due to the ongoing financial crisis at that time. He felt "useless" because the environment was poor and uncertain, limiting his function primarily to representing the country. He also faced severe budget cuts, including a two-to-three-month suspension of salaries, which forced his office to live off existing funds and laid off local staffs.

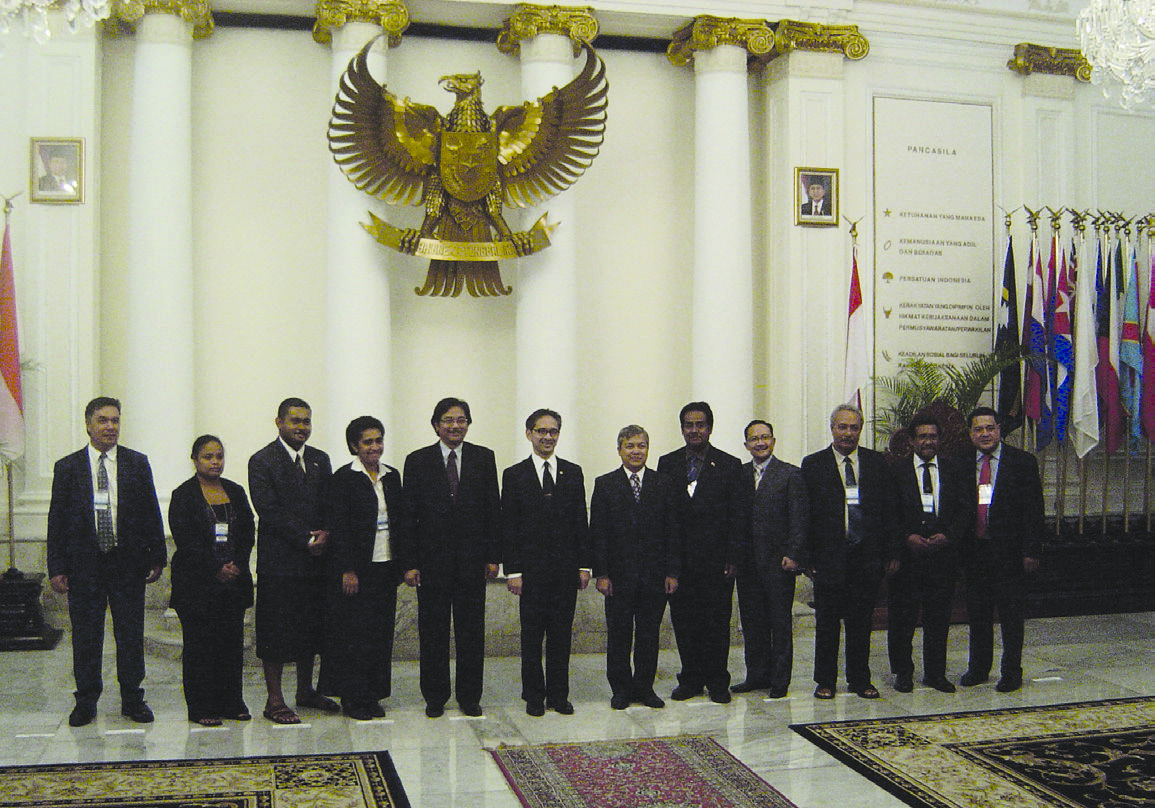
Ibnu (sixth from right) at the Bandung Spirit Program in 2009.

After 2000, he returned to the foreign department, serving as deputy director for APEC until 2002. He was then posted at the economic section of the embassy in Washington, D.C. with the rank of counsellor, and later, minister counsellor. His experience in the US taught him the value of being "talkative," having a clear and loud voice, and maintaining eye contact to demonstrate conviction and clarity. After three years, he was then recalled to the foreign department and was sworn in as director of Asia, Pacific, and Africa intraregional cooperation on 28 December 2005. Ibnu, along with other diplomats occupying strategic posts at that time, was part of a group nicknamed as the Hassan's boys, which was cultivated by foreign minister Hassan Wirajuda to lead Indonesia's foreign policy.

On 12 December 2009, Ibnu was sworn in as consul general in Osaka. As consul general in Indonesia, Ibnu built close ties with Japanese businessmen, including facilitating visits by them to Indonesia. In 2012, Ibnu cooperated with the Osaka prefecture government to hold an education exhibition in Jakarta. After serving in Osaka, in May 2013 he became the director of North and Central America in the foreign ministry.

On 6 August 2015, Ibnu was nominated as ambassador to Vietnam. After undergoing an assessment by the House of Representatives's first commission on 15 September 2015, Ibnu was installed on 23 December 2015. He presented his credentials to the President of Vietnam Trương Tấn Sang on 26 March 2016. Ibnu was tasked to increase the value of bilateral trade and investment between the two countries and resolve exclusive economic zone negotiations.

As ambassador, Ibnu facilitated the return of Indonesian car imports to Vietnam and in promoting Indonesian products like coal for Vietnamese power plants. In the economic and trade sector, the two countries recorded an increase in bilateral trade from US$6.8 billion in 2017 to US$7.4 billion in 2018, aiming for US$10 billion by the end of 2020. He also worked to boost people-to-people contact through initiatives like Indonesian language courses, encouraging Vietnamese students to study in Indonesia, and fostering university partnerships, including hosting a music performance for young Vietnamese in December 2018.

During his tenure, Ibnu oversaw high-level exchanges, including the visit of the General Secretary of the Communist Party of Vietnam in August 2017, the visit of the President of Indonesia for APEC in November 2017, and further high-frequency exchanges in 2018, such as the Indonesian President's bilateral visit and attendance at the WEF, followed by the Vietnamese Prime Minister's visit to Bali for the WB-IMF meeting. The meetings resulted in agreements related to education, law, rural development, gas utilization in continental shelf border areas, coal supply, and the strengthening maritime security cooperation and combating illegal, unreported and unregulated fishing, which the embassy worked to facilitate by connecting government agencies in Indonesia and Vietnam to implement the agreements. For his works as ambassador, Ibnu received the Medal for Peace and Friendship among Nations from the Vietnam Union of Friendship Organizations on 24 November 2020. He officially ended his ambassadorial tenure on 14 December 2020 and was replaced by chargés d'affaires ad interim Masriati Lita Pratama.

== Personal life ==
Ibnu Hadi is married to Dyah Prastyawati Hadi and has three children.
