= Nong =

Nong may refer to:

- Nong, Iran, a village in Hormozgan Province, Iran
- Nong District, a district of Savannakhet Province, Laos
- The Nung people of Vietnam, or the Nong 农 branch of the Zhuang people of Wenshan Zhuang and Miao Autonomous Prefecture, Yunnan, China

== Surname ==
- Nong (surname), Chinese surname (農 / 农)
- Nông Thị Xuân (1932–1957), mistress of Ho Chi Minh
- Nông Đức Mạnh (born 1940), Vietnamese politician, former general secretary of the Communist Party of Vietnam
- Aloys Nong (born 1983), Cameroonian footballer

== See also ==
- Nong (Thai: หนอง), a place name element in Thai meaning wetland, natural pool or swamp
- A Nong (c. 1005–1055), a Zhuang shamaness, matriarch and warrior
