= Nguyễn Thị Hiền =

Former First Lady of Vietnam

Madame Nguyễn Thị Hiền
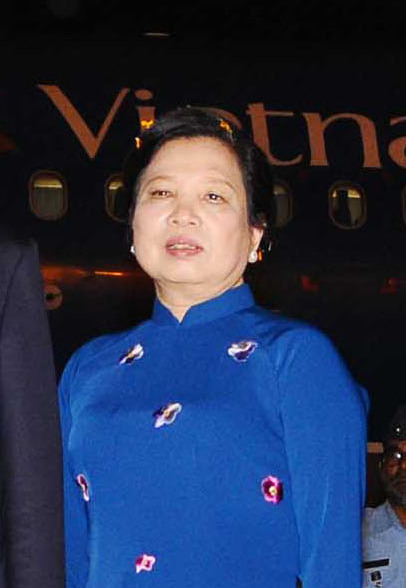
- Hiền during a state visit to India in 2018

Spouse of the President of Vietnam
- In role 2 April 2016 – 21 September 2018
- President: Trần Đại Quang
- Preceded by: Mai Thị Hạnh
- Succeeded by: Ngô Thị Mận

Personal details
- Born: 1958 (age 67–68) Vĩnh Phúc Province, North Vietnam
- Spouse: Trần Đại Quang
- Children: Trần Quân

Nguyễn Thị Hiền (Vietnamese pronunciation: [ŋwiən˦ˀ˥ tʰi˧˨ʔ hiən˨˩]; born 1958) is the former Spouse of the President of Vietnam during the presidency of Trần Đại Quang from 2016 until his death in 2018. Hiền is known for her philanthropy and efforts in promoting foreign investment and tourism.

== Spouse of the President of Vietnam ==
As the de facto First Lady of Vietnam, Madam Hiền accompanied her husband in various state visits and hosted first ladies and leaders' spouses in various events such as the APEC Vietnam 2017. She is known for her philanthropy during many natural disasters in Central Vietnam and is also involved in promoting investment and tourism for Vĩnh Phúc province where she and President Quang hailed from.

== Personal life ==
Hiền is the widow of the late President Quang. They developed a relationship during high school years in their hometown of Vĩnh Phúc and married when the pair relocated to Hanoi. They had one son, Trần Quân (born 1984), who is currently the Head of the State Treasury of Vietnam.

Unofficial roles
Preceded by Mai Thị Hạnh	Spouse of the President of Vietnam; 2016–2018	Succeeded by Ngô Thị Mân
