= Trần Thị Nguyệt Thu =

Former First Lady of Vietnam

- Madame
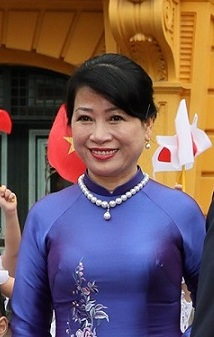
- Thu in 2020

Spouse of the President of Vietnam
- Reign: 5 April 2021 – 18 January 2023
- Presidential inauguration: 5 April 2021
- Predecessor: Ngô Thị Mận
- Successor: Phan Thị Thanh Tâm

Spouse of the Prime Minister of Vietnam
- Reign: 7 April 2016 – 5 April 2021
- Take office: 7 April 2016
- Predecessor: Trần Thanh Kiệm
- Successor: Lê Thị Bích Trân
- Born: 1956 (age 69–70); Quảng Nam, Republic of Vietnam
- Spouse: Nguyễn Xuân Phúc
- Children: Nguyễn Thị Xuân Trang; Nguyễn Xuân Hiếu

Trần Thị Nguyệt Thu is the former Spouse of President of Vietnam (de facto First Lady) during her husband Nguyễn Xuân Phúc's presidency from April 2021 to January 2023, when he resigned amid a series of corruption scandals. She was previously the Spouse of the Prime Minister during her husband's premiership from 2016 to 2021. She is known for her elegant fashion style, often wearing the traditional Vietnamese dress áo dài, and is occasionally dubbed the First Lady of Vietnam by the overseas Vietnamese press.

== Biography ==
=== Spouse of the Prime Minister and President ===
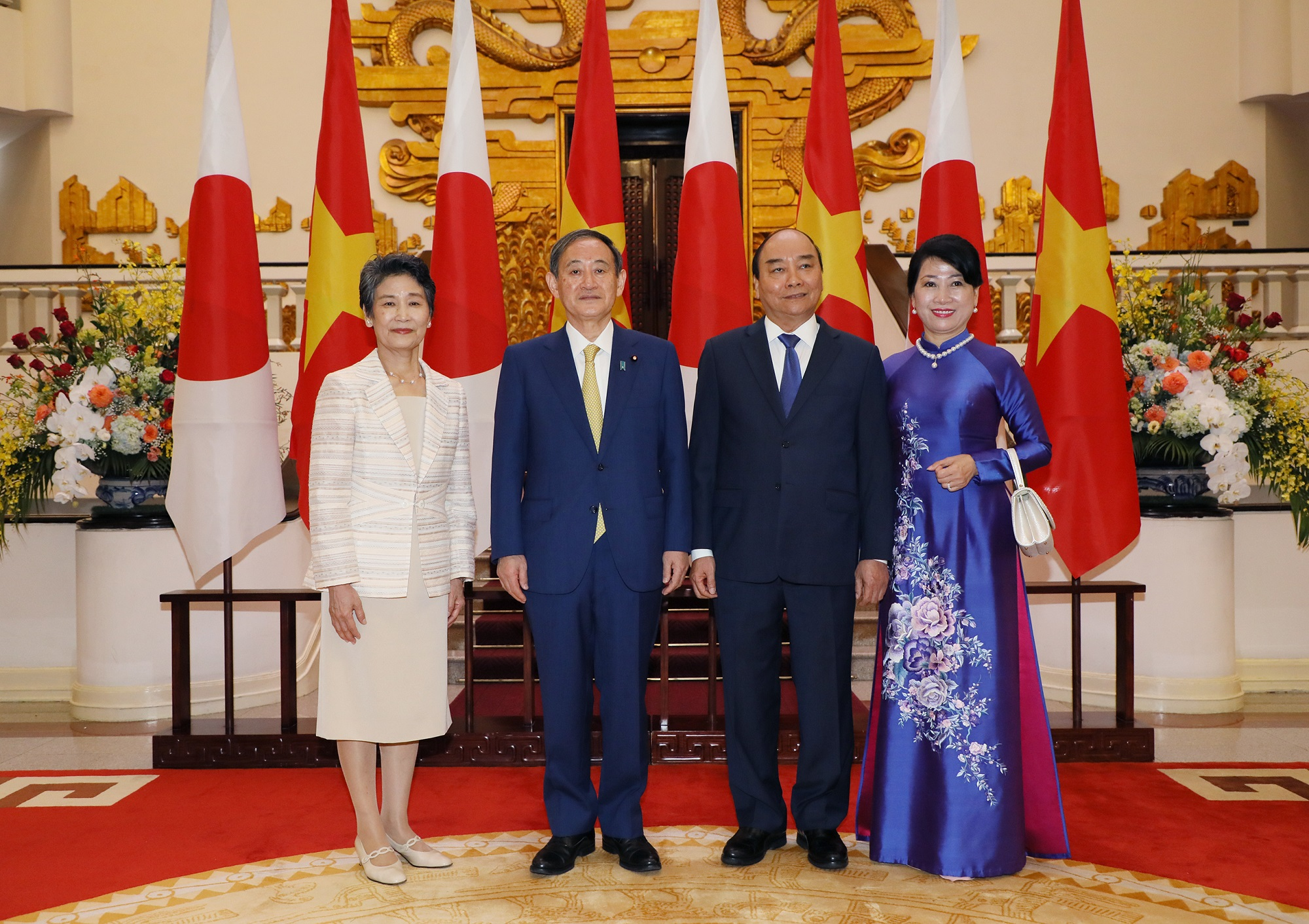
Madame Thu and then-Prime Minister Phúc receiving Japanese Prime Minister Yoshihide Suga and First Lady Mariko Suga in Hanoi on October 19, 2020.

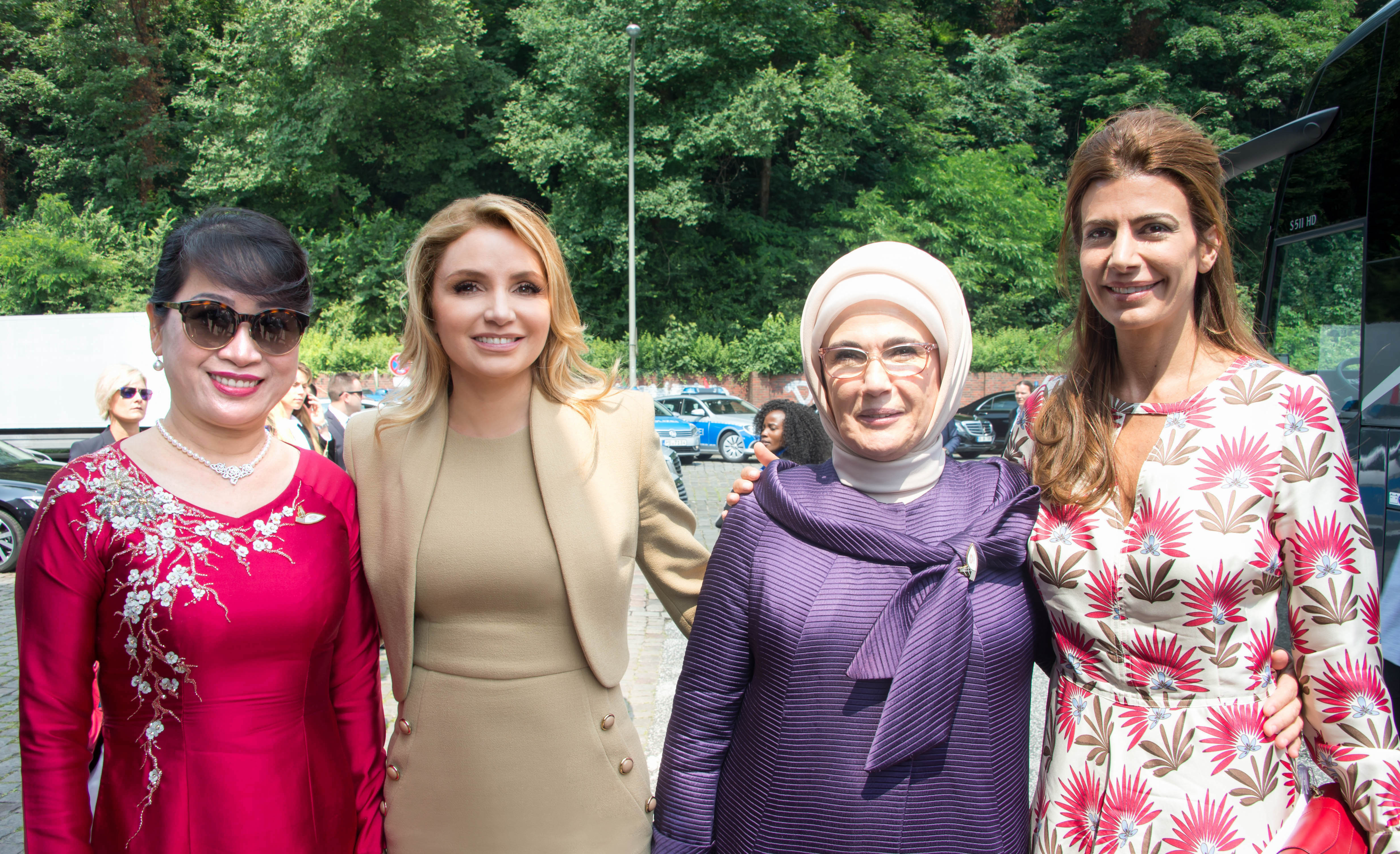
Madame Thu together with Mexican First Lady Angélica Rivera, Turkish First Lady Emine Erdoğan, and Argentine First Lady Juliana Awada at G20 Germany in July 2017

Since her husband's ascend to the premiership in 2016 and the presidency in 2021, Madame Thu has accompanied Mr. Phúc on various state visits and received many foreign dignitaries, including hosting first ladies and spouses of foreign heads of states. She is known for her fashion style, often wearing the traditional Vietnamese dress áo dài and matching its color to the necktie of her husband, which has become an internet sensation in Vietnam.

=== Family ===
Madame Thu has two children with Mr. Phúc. Their son, Nguyễn Xuân Hiếu, is currently the Chief of the Central Office of the Vietnamese Youth Union. Their daughter, Nguyễn Thị Xuân Trang (born 1986), is a businesswoman and major shareholder of the Gateway International School in Hanoi. Ms. Trang is married to Vũ Chí Hùng, who is currently the deputy director of the General Department of Taxation at the Ministry of Finance of Vietnam.

=== Controversy ===
Thu has attracted controversy due to her alleged ties to the Việt Á scandal involving bribery and overpricing of COVID-19 test kit, which is partially responsible for her husband's resignation. In his resignation address, former President Phúc denied any conspiracy theories insinuating that his wife was associated with the Việt Á scandal.

"My family, my wife and children did not earn personal gains or commit corruption related to Viet A, and have never met Viet A director, and these have been clearly concluded by the Central Inspection Commission"

— Nguyễn Xuân Phúc,

Some dissident organizations have urged for her arrest, arguing that not prosecuting Thu would not reflect well on the anti-graft campaigns of General Secretary Nguyễn Phú Trọng. Others, like the Việt Nam Thời Báo, a dissident publication of the Independent Association of Vietnamese Journalists, disagreed and instead called on the Vietnam Women's Union to protect the "dignity" of Thu, claiming that Thu was used as a scapegoat by the Central Propaganda Department of the Communist Party to discredit and force her husband into resignation.

Unofficial roles
Preceded by Ngô Thị Mân	Spouse of the President of Vietnam; 2021–2023	Succeeded by Phan Thị Thanh Tâm
