= Nguyễn Thị Minh Nguyệt (Lương Cường) =

Spouse of the Vietnamese president since 2024

Madame Nguyễn Thị Minh Nguyệt
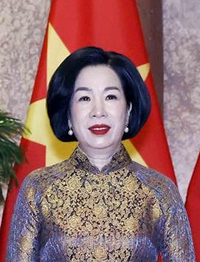
- Nguyệt in 2024

Spouse of the President of Vietnam
- In role 21 October 2024 – 7 April 2026
- President: Lương Cường
- Preceded by: Ngô Phương Ly
- Succeeded by: Ngô Phương Ly

Personal details
- Born: Phú Thọ, North Vietnam (now Vietnam)
- Party: Fatherland Front,Communist Party of Vietnam
- Spouse: Lương Cường
- Children: 2

Nguyễn Thị Minh Nguyệt (Phú Thọ) is the wife of President of Vietnam Lương Cường. She has served as the spouse of the Vietnamese president from 21 October 2024 until 7 April 2026.
