= Ngô Phương Ly =

First Lady of Vietnam since 2024

- Ly in 2026

Spouse of the General Secretary of the Communist Party of Vietnam
- Incumbent
- Assumed role 3 August 2024^{[a]}
- General Secretary: Tô Lâm
- Preceded by: Ngô Thị Mận

Spouse of the President of Vietnam
- Incumbent
- Assumed role 7 April 2026
- President: Tô Lâm
- Preceded by: Nguyễn Thị Minh Nguyệt
- In role 22 May 2024 – 21 October 2024
- President: Tô Lâm
- Preceded by: Phan Thị Thanh Tâm
- Succeeded by: Nguyễn Thị Minh Nguyệt

Personal details
- Born: Ngô Thị Phương Ly; 1970 (age 55–56) Hanoi, North Vietnam (now Vietnam)
- Party: Communist Party of Vietnam
- Spouse: Tô Lâm
- Children: 2
- a. Acting: 19 July – 3 August 2024

Ngô Thị Phương Ly (Note: Born name in the identity card.) (born 1970) is a Vietnamese journalist and the wife of General Secretary of the Communist Party and President Tô Lâm. She has served as the de facto First Lady of Vietnam since 2024.

== Biography ==
Ly was born in Hanoi, the third child of People's Artist and animation director Ngô Mạnh Lân and actress Phan Thị Ngọc Lan.

Ly has served as head of the Culture and Arts Department at VTV. She was one of the developers of the talk show Người xây tổ ấm (Who Builds the Family) on the VTV3 channel. She is also credited with designing the logo for the Kite Awards.

She is the second wife of Tô Lâm, who has served as General Secretary of the Communist Party of Vietnam — the highest political position in the country — since 2024. Before marrying Ly, Lâm had been married to another woman, from whom he later divorced.

== Honours ==
Year	Work	Reward	Note
2024	Hoa cài trên lá chắn	Certificate of Merit (Ministry of Public Security)	

== Notes ==
Honorary titles
Preceded by Phan Thị Thanh Tâm	Spouse of the President of Vietnam; 2024	Succeeded by Nguyễn Thị Minh Nguyệt
Preceded by Ngô Thị Mận	Spouse of the Supreme Leader of Vietnam; 2024–present	Succeeded by Incumbent
