= Giau =

Giau may refer to:

- Giau Pass, a mountain pass in the Dolomites, Italy
- Đoàn Thị Giàu (1898–1974), Vietnamese revolutionary
