= Đoàn Thị Giàu =

First Lady of Vietnam

Madame Đoàn Thị Giàu
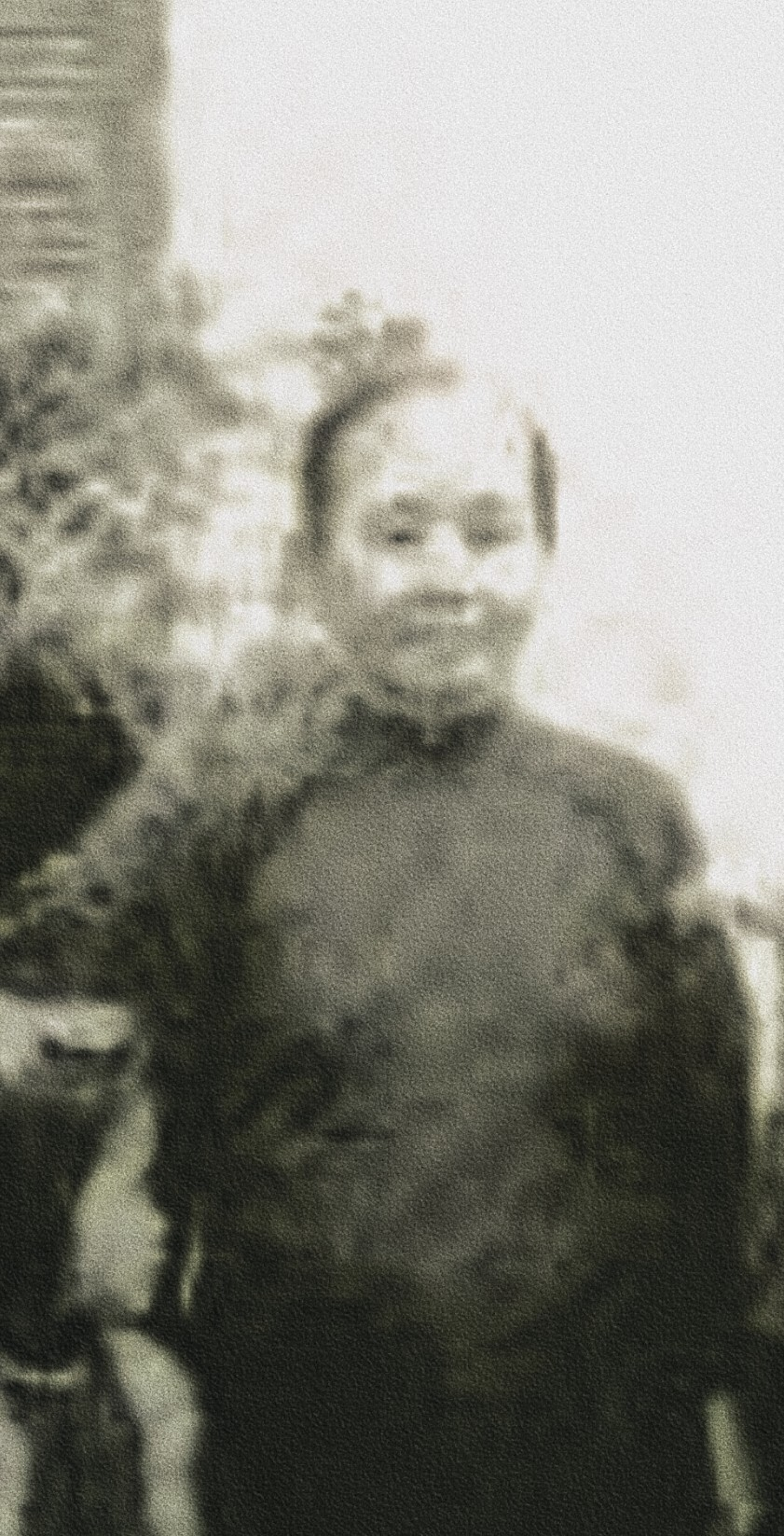
- Giàu, c. 1954

Spouse of the President of North Vietnam
- In role 2 September 1969 – 25 May 1974†
- President: Tôn Đức Thắng
- Preceded by: ‘vacant’Tăng Tuyết Minh
- Succeeded by: Dương Thị Chung (1980)

Personal details
- Born: 1898 Vĩnh Kim village, Châu Thành district, Tiền Giang province, French Cochinchina
- Died: 1974 (aged 75–76) Hanoi, North Vietnam
- Spouse: Tôn Đức Thắng

Đoàn Thị Giàu (1898–1974) was a Vietnamese teacher and revolutionary. As the spouse of Vietnamese president Tôn Đức Thắng, she served as the de facto First Lady of North Vietnam from 1969 until her death in 1974, one year before the country was unified.

== Biography ==
=== Early life ===
Giàu was born in 1898 at Vĩnh Kim village, Châu Thành district, Tiền Giang province of then-French Cochinchina (southern Vietnam). She married Thắng in 1921 but the pair was separated for almost 30 years due to the Indochina Wars. They had three children (2 daughter and 1 son), which Giàu raised all by herself. Their son died during a famine at the age of 3.

She is believed to have influenced Thắng's decision to join the Indochinese Communist Party, the predecessor of the Communist Party of Vietnam.

=== Spouse of the President ===
In 1954, following the Geneva Conference, Giàu relocated to North Vietnam and reunited with her husband. When Tôn Đức Thắng became President of Vietnam in 1969, Giàu was the de facto First Lady of North Vietnam until her death in 1974. She was believed to have maintained an austere lifestyle.
