= Trần Thị Kim Chi =

Former First Lady of Vietnam

Madame Trần Thị Kim Chi
- Madame Chi in 2006

Spouse of the President of Vietnam
- In role 27 June 2006 – 25 July 2011
- President: Nguyễn Minh Triết
- Preceded by: Nguyễn Thị Vinh
- Succeeded by: Mai Thị Hạnh

Personal details
- Born: Bình Dương Province, Vietnam
- Spouse: Nguyễn Minh Triết

Trần Thị Kim Chi is the former Spouse of the President of Vietnam during the presidency of Nguyễn Minh Triết from 2006 to 2011.
