= Phan Thị Thanh Tâm =

Her Excellency Phan Thị Thanh Tâm
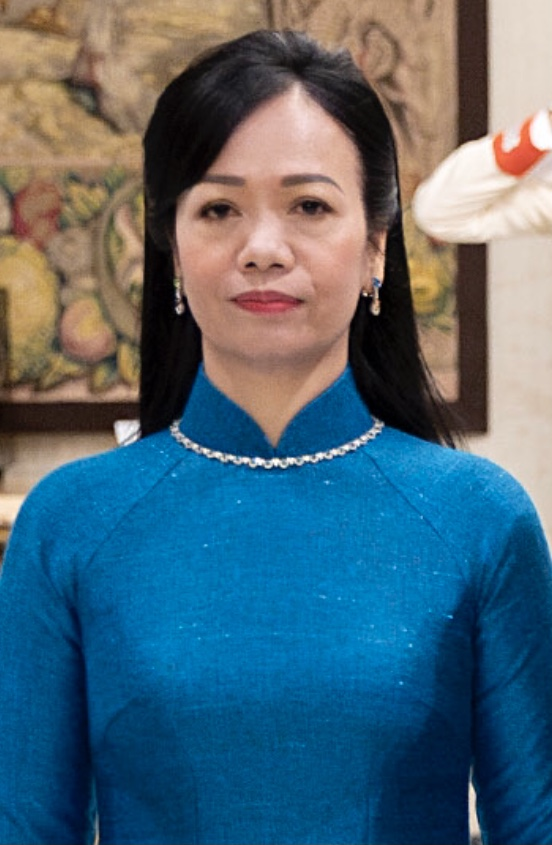
- Tâm in 2023

Spouse of the President of Vietnam
- In role March 2, 2023 – March 21, 2024
- President: Võ Văn Thưởng
- Preceded by: Trần Thị Nguyệt Thu
- Succeeded by: Ngô Phương Ly

Personal details
- Born: 1976 (age 49–50) Bình Định, Vietnam
- Spouse: Võ Văn Thưởng

Phan Thị Thanh Tâm is the former Spouse of the President of Vietnam (de facto First Lady) during the presidency of Võ Văn Thưởng from March 3, 2023 to March 21, 2024. Her first appearance in state media was on April 4, 2023 during the state visit of Australian Governor-General David Hurley to Vietnam.

She is known for her role as Deputy Head of Vietcombank.

Her husband is former President Võ Văn Thưởng, who served from March 2, 2023, to March 21, 2024.

On the morning of March 21, 2024, the National Assembly agreed to relieve Võ Văn Thưởng of his position as President for the 2021–2026 term and to terminate his duties as a deputy of the 15th National Assembly.

During the session, National Assembly leadership presented the proposal from the National Assembly Standing Committee regarding the relief of Võ Văn Thưởng from the presidency (2021–2026 term) and the termination of his duties as a deputy of the 15th National Assembly. Subsequently, the National Assembly conducted a secret ballot and voted to adopt the resolution relieving Mr. Vo Van Thuong of the presidency (2021–2026 term) and terminating his duties as a deputy of the 15th National Assembly (representing the Da Nang City delegation).

Unofficial roles
| Preceded by Trần Thị Nguyệt Thu | Spouse of the President of Vietnam; 2023–2024 | Succeeded by Ngô Phương Ly |
