= Trần Đại Quang =

President of Vietnam from 2016 to 2018

General Trần Đại Quang
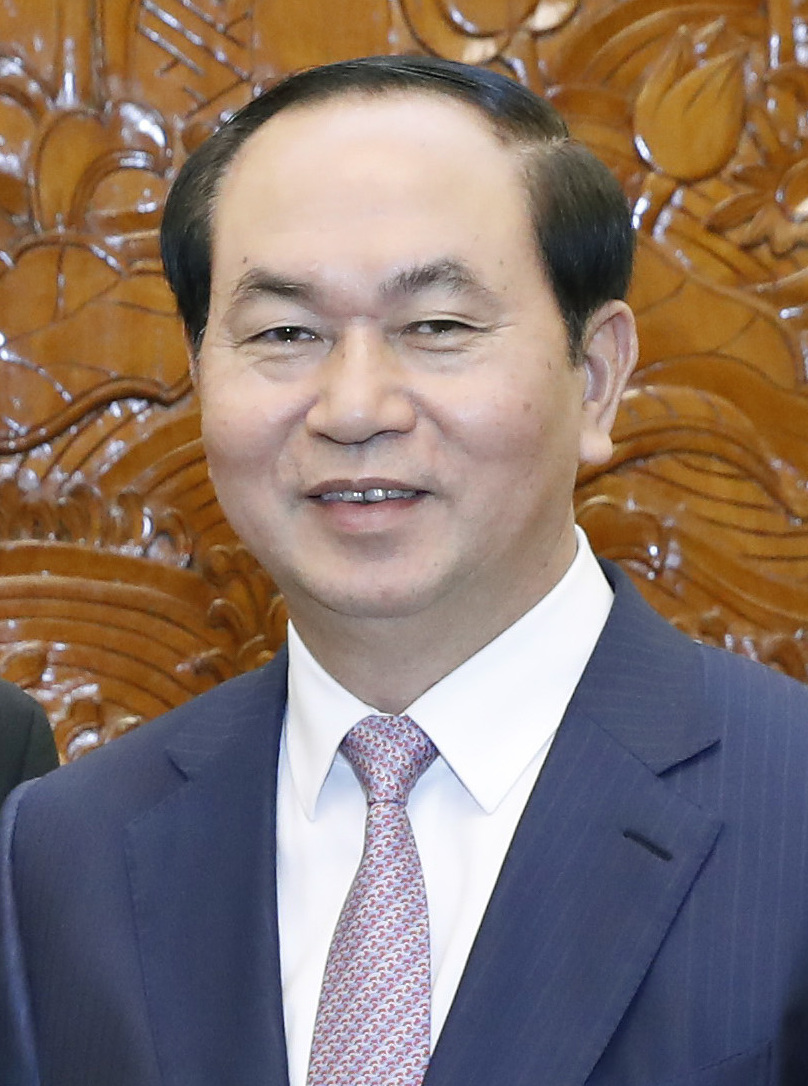
- Quang in 2017

9th President of Vietnam
- In office 2 April 2016 – 21 September 2018
- Prime Minister: Nguyễn Tấn Dũng; Nguyễn Xuân Phúc
- Vice President: Đặng Thị Ngọc Thịnh
- Preceded by: Trương Tấn Sang
- Succeeded by: Nguyễn Phú Trọng

President of the Vietnam Red Cross Society
- In office 16 August 2017 – 21 September 2018
- Preceded by: Trương Tấn Sang
- Succeeded by: Nguyễn Phú Trọng

Member of the National Assembly
- In office 22 May 2016 – 21 September 2018
- Preceded by: Trương Tấn Sang
- Succeeded by: Nguyễn Xuân Phúc
- Constituency: Ho Chi Minh City

Minister of Public Security
- In office 3 August 2011 – 8 April 2016
- Prime Minister: Nguyễn Tấn Dũng
- Preceded by: Lê Hồng Anh
- Succeeded by: Tô Lâm

Secretary of the Central Police Party Committee
- In office 30 August 2011 – 4 May 2016
- Preceded by: Lê Hồng Anh
- Succeeded by: Tô Lâm

Head of Central Highlands Steering Committee
- In office 3 August 2011 – 31 July 2016
- Preceded by: Lê Hồng Anh
- Succeeded by: Tô Lâm

Member of the National Assembly
- In office 2011–2016
- Constituency: Ninh Binh

Personal details
- Born: 12 October 1956 Ninh Bình Province, North Vietnam
- Died: 21 September 2018 (aged 61) Hanoi, Vietnam
- Resting place: Kim Sơn District, Ninh Binh
- Party: Communist Party of Vietnam (1980–2018)
- Spouse: Nguyễn Thị Hiền
- Children: 1
- Education: University of Security (BA); Vietnam National University, Hanoi LLB); National Academy of Public Administration, Ho Chi Minh (PhD) (LLD)
- Religion: Buddhism
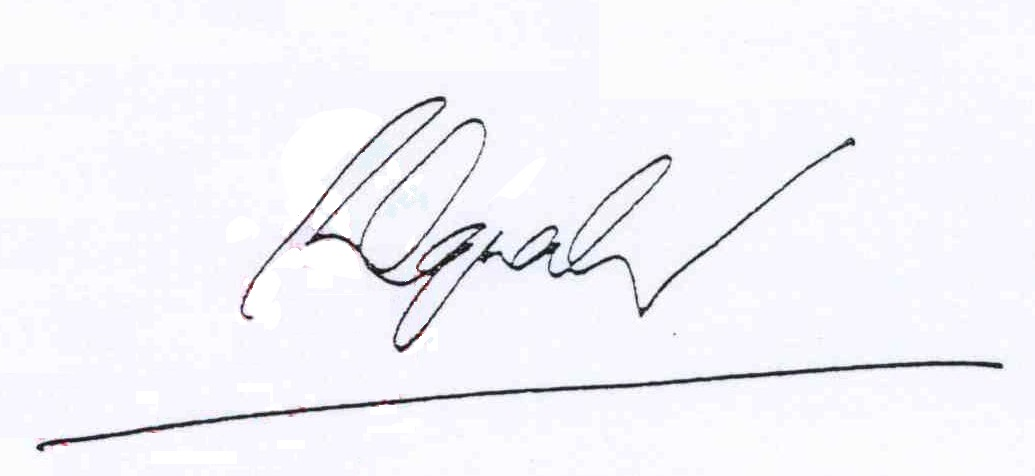
- Signature

Military service
- Allegiance: Vietnam
- Branch/service: Vietnam People's Public Security
- Years of service: 1972–2016
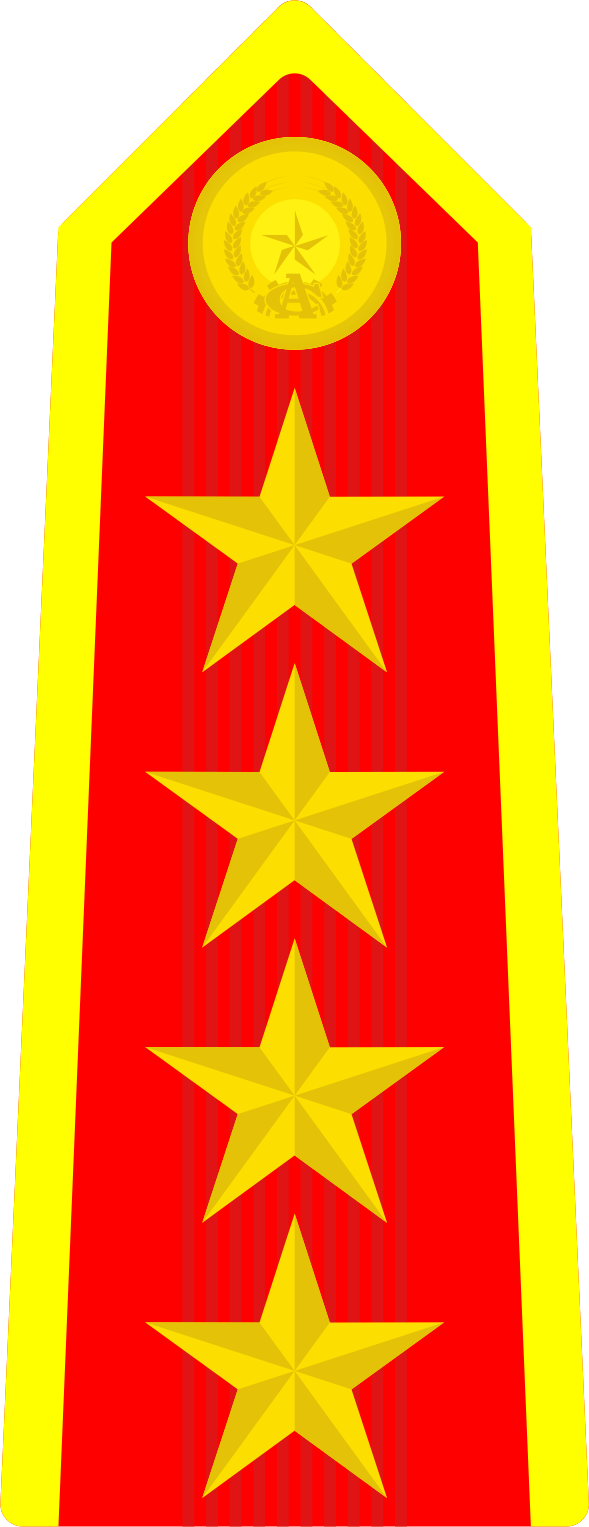
- Rank: Police general
- Awards: Order of José Martí (2016); Military Exploit Order (2011); Fatherland Defense Order (2011); Feat Order

Trần Đại Quang (Vietnamese: [t͡ɕən˨˩ ʔɗaːj˧˨ʔ kwaːŋ˧˧]; 12 October 1956 – 21 September 2018) was a Vietnamese politician and former police general who served as the ninth president of Vietnam from 2016 until his death in 2018. After serving for five years as the Minister of Public Security from 2011 to 2016, Quang was nominated by his predecessor Trương Tấn Sang to the presidency and was elected to the post by the National Assembly of Vietnam on 2 April 2016. He was one of the country's top leaders and ranked second in the Politburo behind Nguyễn Phú Trọng, the General Secretary of the Communist Party.

== Early life ==
Trần Đại Quang was born on 12 October 1956 in Ninh Bình Province, in what was then the Democratic Republic of Vietnam. His father worked as a fish catcher in the river, while his mother worked as a banana seller. After his father's death, his mother struggled to raise their four boys and two girls. Trần helped his mother farming and was known for his hard work, dedication, composure and calm qualities.

== Education ==
- Kim Son B High School (now Kim Son B High School), in Nhu Hoa commune, Kim Sơn district, Ninh Bình province (high school curriculum at that time in Northern Vietnam consisted of 10 years).
- July 1972 – October 1972: student of People's Police School (now People's Police Academy) nearly 16 years old (this school at this time provided secondary training for the people's police force)
- October 1972 - October 1975: student at the School of Foreign Languages and Culture Ministry of Home Affairs (now the Ministry of Public Security)
- 1981 – 1986: Graduated from 5-year in-service training university, major in Reconnaissance, People's Security University (now Academy People's security).
- October 1989 - April 1991: studied advanced political theory at Nguyen Ai Quoc Academy
- 1991 – 1994: studying Hanoi Law University, in-service training.
- 1994 – 1997: PhD student at Ho Chi Minh National Academy of Politics
- 1996: Degree Associate Doctor Jurisprudence, topic "Strengthening state management of national security in our country today", instructor: Assoc.Prof.PTS Tran Ngoc Duong, Hanoi, 1996, 173 pages.
- In 2003: was promoted to Associate Professor
- In 2009: was awarded the title of Professor of security science
- He can speak Chinese fluently.

== Political career ==
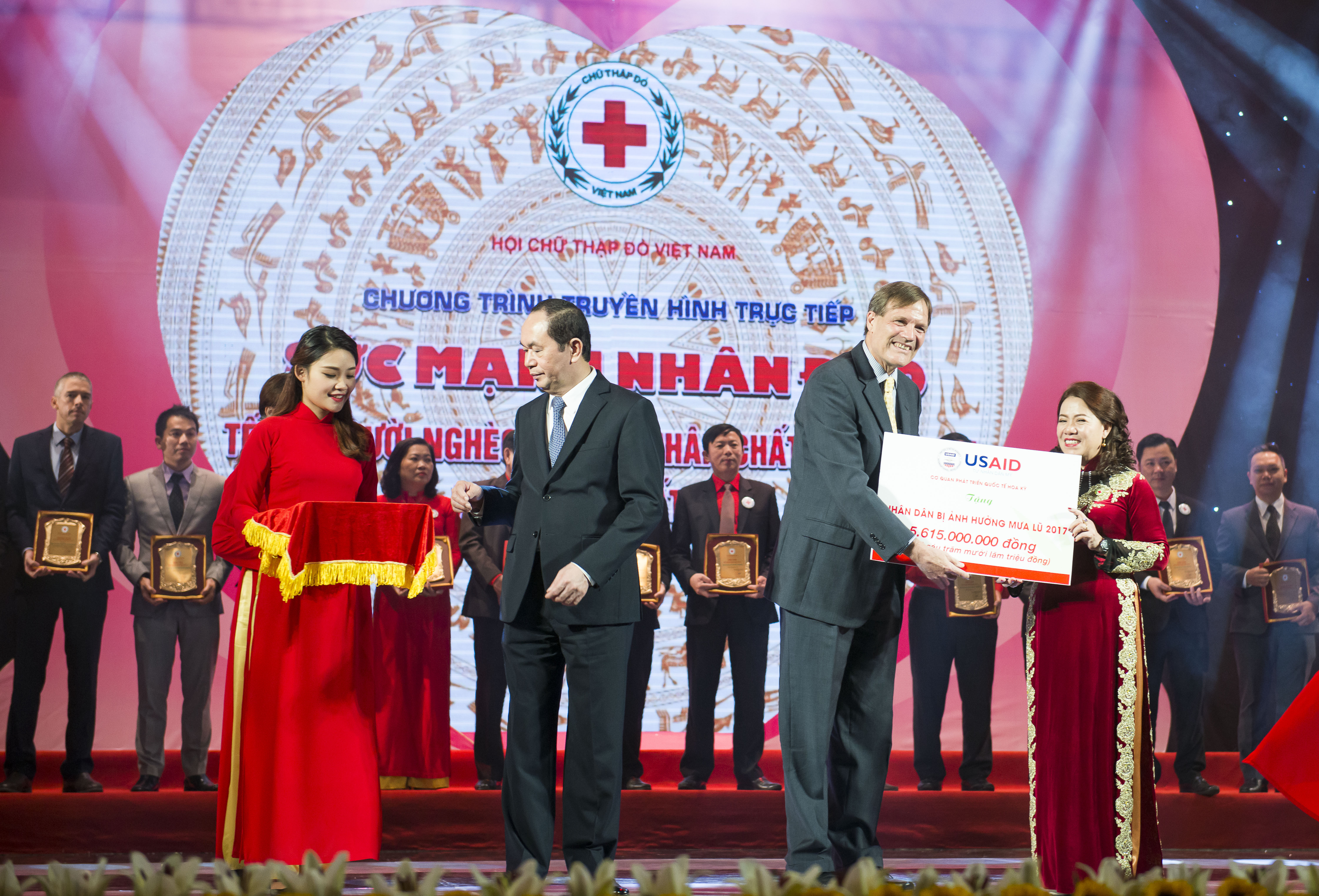
Vietnam's State President Trần Đại Quang Recognizes USAID's Disaster Relief Assistance, 2017

Trần Đại Quang previously served as Minister of Public Security from 2011 to 2016, Vice Head of Committee on HIV / AIDS Prevention from 2011 to 2014, and President of the Viet Nam Red Cross Society from 2017 to 2018. He was a member of the 12th Politburo of the Communist Party of Vietnam, in which he was ranked second, after General Secretary Nguyễn Phú Trọng.

Trần Đại Quang joined the Communist Party of Vietnam on 26 July 1980 and became officially party member on 26 July 1981. And from 1997 he became a member of the Politburo of the Communist Party of Vietnam and a member of the Central Committee of the party.

== Presidency (2016-2018) ==
At the 12th Congress of the Communist Party of Vietnam in January 2016. Trần Đại Quang was nominated President of the Socialist Republic of Vietnam and confirmed on 2 April 2016 by the National Assembly of Vietnam. On that day, he succeeded Trương Tấn Sang. On the same day he proposed Nguyễn Xuân Phúc as the new head of government.

=== Protest law ===
==== Explanation of the reason why there is no Law on Demonstrations ====
On 26 April 2017, at a meeting with voters in Districts 1, 3, and 4 of Ho Chi Minh City, Tran Dai Quang affirmed that the Law on Protests is highly valued by the National Assembly, but the quality of the drafting agency's Law project is poor, so delayed for world reference. He also said it is necessary to amend land laws because there are many lawsuits and complaints related to land.

=== On the promulgation of the Law on Demonstrations and reporting to the National Assembly ===
19 June 2018, at the meeting with voters of District 1, District 3, District 4 of Ho Chi Minh City after the 5th session of the 14th National Assembly, in response to questions from residents Le Van Sy and Le Sy Dau (district 4) It is necessary to have a Law on Protests soon, and request the National Assembly to directly draft a Law on Protests and not assign it to the [Vietnam Ministry of Public Security] to draft it. Some newspapers reported that Mr. Tran Dai Quang expressed agreement with this opinion and promised to report to the National Assembly for promulgation.

When Tuoi Tre published this news, the Ministry of Information and Communications asked Tuoi Tre to change the article title and delete the quote from Mr. Tran Dai Quang, then decided to temporarily suspend the operation of Tuoi Tre Online newspaper in 3 months, fined 220 million VND for posting fake news, and Mr. Tran Dai Quang did not say so. Some other newspapers were also fined at a lighter level.

=== Foreign Affairs ===
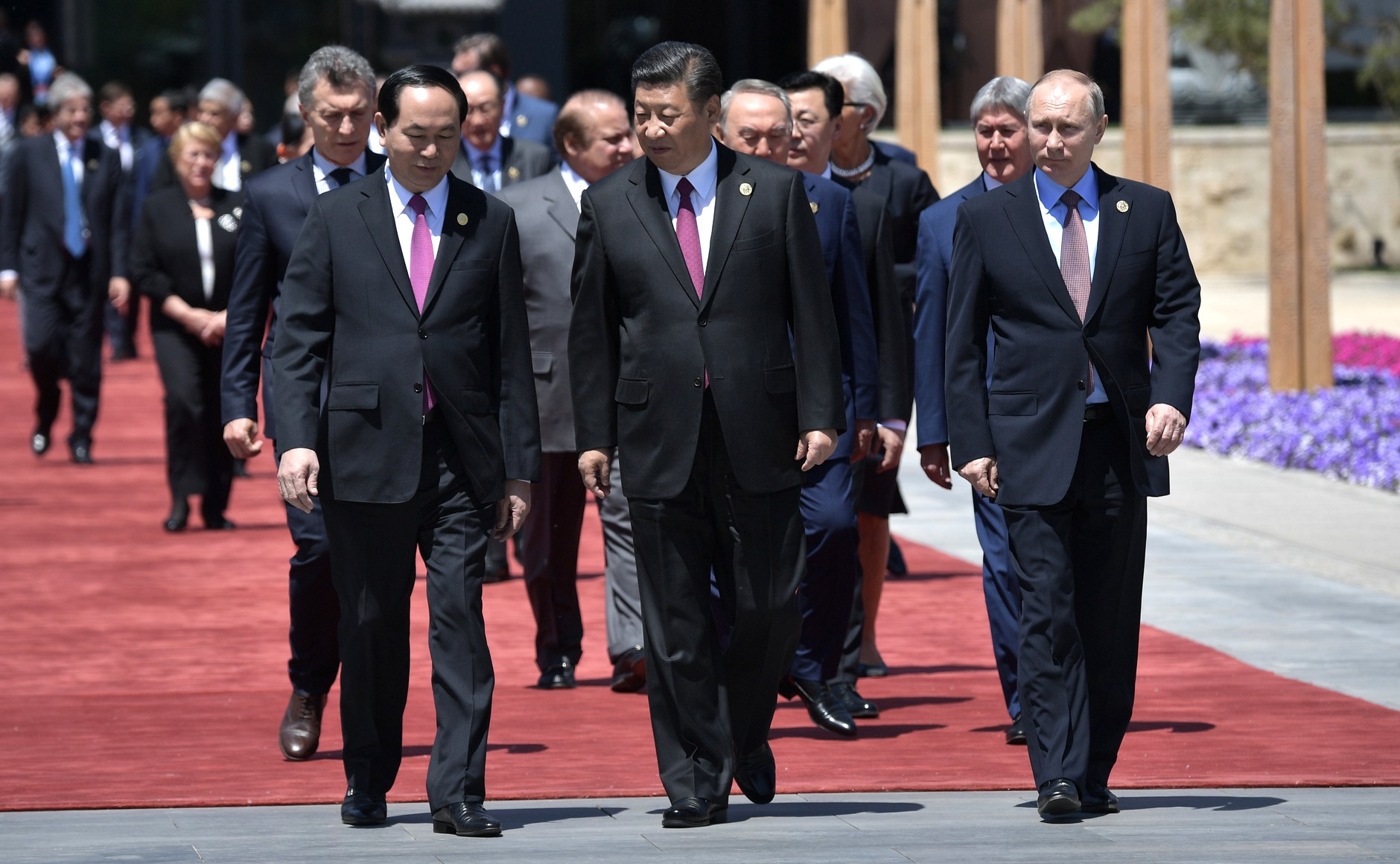
Russian President Vladimir Putin (right) with CCP General Secretary Xi Jinping and President Trần Đại Quang (left) at the Belt and Road International Cooperation Forum

==== Belt and Road International Cooperation Forum ====
On 15 May 2017, Trần Đại Quang attended the International Cooperation Forum on "Belt and Road" held in Beijing, China. Speaking at the conference, he welcomed economic and regional connectivity initiatives in general, and the "Belt and Road" Initiative in particular, and was ready to cooperate with other countries in research and construction. and implement projects that bring common benefits, contributing to the successful implementation of sustainable development goals.

==== APEC Conference ====
Quang informed APEC business representatives that Vietnam is currently one of the fastest growing markets and is forecast to be among the top 5 countries in Asia-Pacific in terms of capacity by 2020. competition in the manufacturing sector. At the same time, Vietnam continues to maintain economic recovery with the goal of achieving an average economic growth of 6.5% to 7% by 2020, determined to make three major breakthroughs in perfecting the economy. market economic mechanisms, human resource development and promoting synchronous and modern infrastructure development. Vietnam is increasingly connecting with both sides of the Pacific through partnerships, the ASEAN Community and networks. 16 FTAs with 59 partners, including 18 APEC member economies.

Also at Lima, Quang officially announced the APEC Year 2017 as well as the APEC Summit Week 2017 in Vietnam..

==== Host the APEC Summit 2017 ====
APEC Future Voices Forum 2017 organizes dialogue with the topics: Promoting sustainable growth, creativity and integration among regional youth Asia-Pacific region. How to create new motivation and cultivate a common future among youth in the Asia-Pacific region; Enterprise, innovation and sustainability - Difficulties in startups and the digital age of the Asia-Pacific region. Attending CSOM were more than 200 delegates including senior officials (SOM) of 21 APEC member economies, representatives of the Secretariat of the Association of Southeast Asian Nations (ASEAN), and the Thai Economic Cooperation Council. Binh Duong (PECC), Pacific Islands Forum (PIF), and APEC Business Advisory Council (ABAC).

==== United States ====
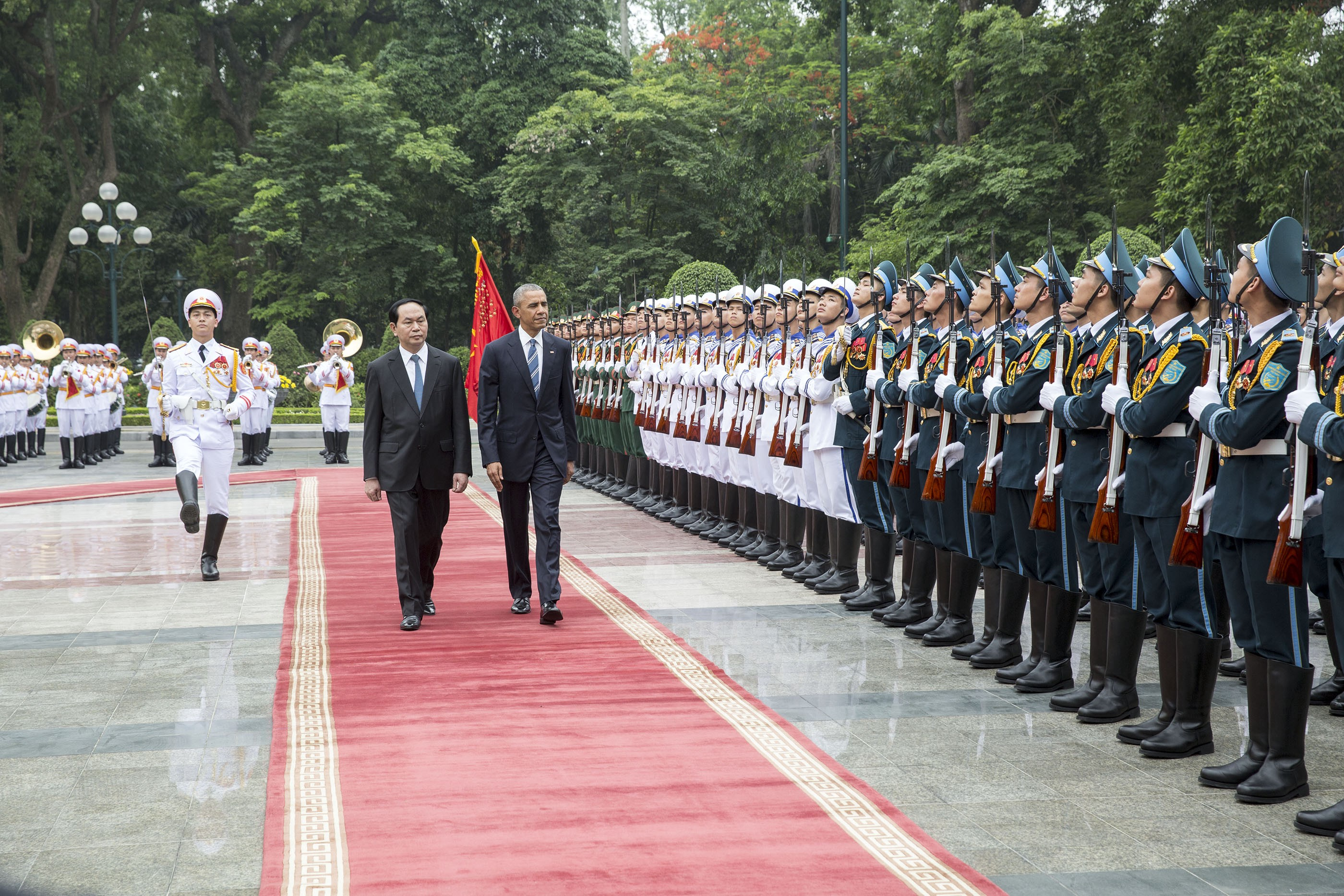
President Quang and President of United States Barack Obama at the Presidential Palace, Hanoi in 2016.

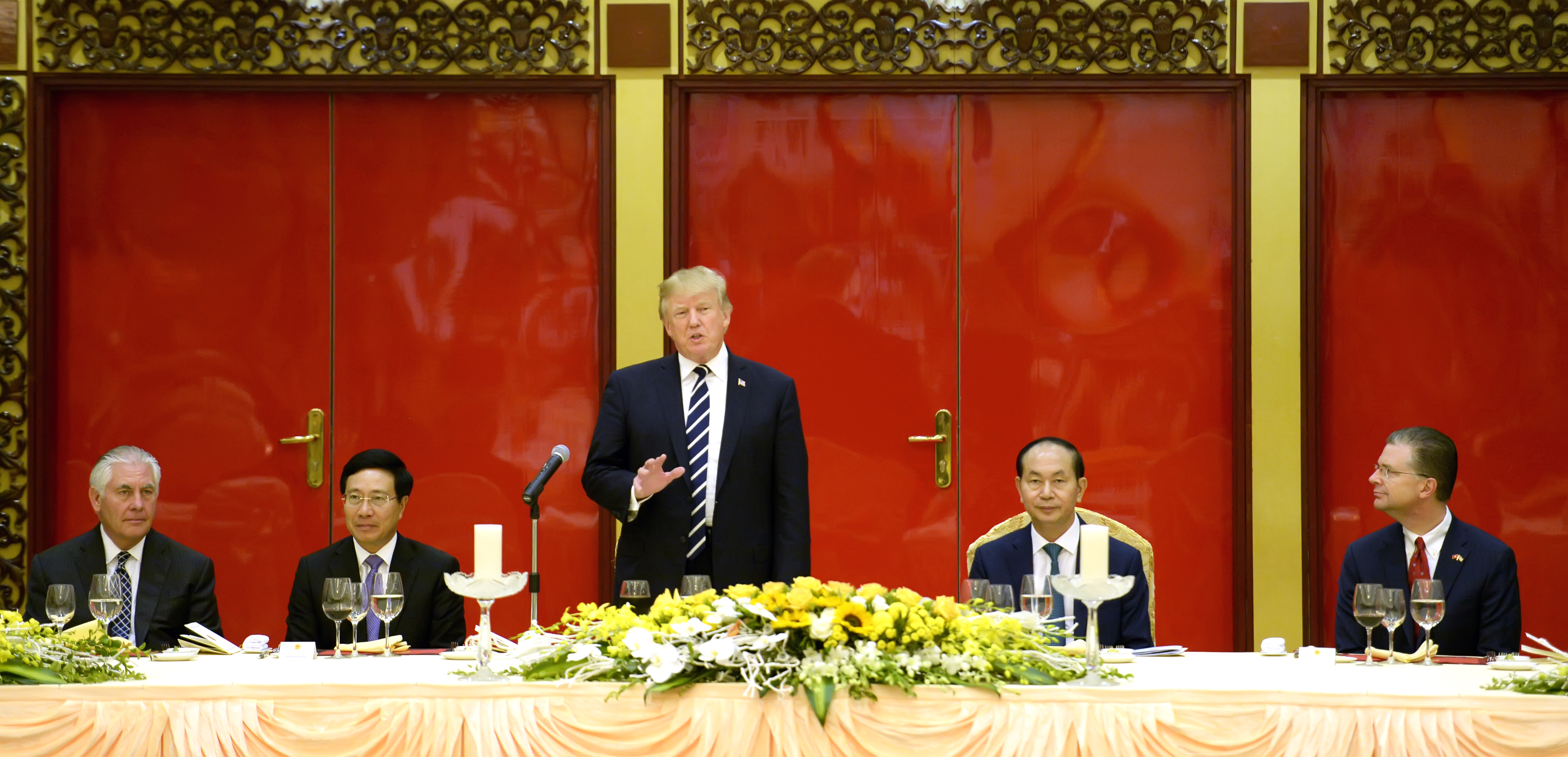
Trump spoke at the State Banquet in Hanoi, 2017

On 23 May 2016, Tran Dai Quang met President of United States Barack Obama during Obama's first trip to Vietnam. During this visit, Obama lifted the arms embargo on Vietnam. On the evening of 11 November 2017, in Hanoi, Quang chaired a State Banquet to welcome President Donald Trump and the US high-ranking delegation. Speaking at the reception, on behalf of the State and people of Vietnam, Quang welcomed Trump and the US high-ranking delegation to make a state visit to Vietnam.

== Honors ==
- Vietnam: Order of Ho Chi Minh (2025, posthumously)
- Vietnam: Fatherland Defense Order (2011)
- Vietnam: Military Exploit Order 1st class (2011)
- Vietnam: Military Exploit Order 1st class (2015)
- Cuba: Order of José Martí (2016)
- Laos: Order of National Gold (2017)
- Vietnam: Military Exploit Order 2nd class
- Vietnam: Military Exploit Order 3rd class
- Vietnam: Feat Order 1st class
- Vietnam: Feat Order 2nd class
- Vietnam: Feat Order 3rd class
- Cambodia: Friendship Order 1st class

== Personal life ==
Trần Đại Quang was married to Madam Nguyễn Thị Hiền, who performed ceremonial functions as the de facto First Lady of Vietnam.

Trần Đại Quang was the second son in the family of four brothers Vinh, Quang, Sáng, Tỏ, and two sisters. His youngest brother is Trần Quốc Tỏ, who is the party secretary (governor) for Thái Nguyên Province.

== Death and state funeral ==
Trần Đại Quang died at the 108 Military Central Hospital on 21 September 2018 in Hanoi from complications of a viral disease at the age of 61 while in office. On 27 September, a state funeral was held in Hanoi, followed by a procession to his home town in Kim Sơn District, Ninh Binh where he was buried. The memorial service was attended by many Vietnamese politicians and foreign dignitaries, including:

- (United Nations) Secretary General of the WFTU, George Mavrikos
- Secretary General of ASEAN, Lim Jock Hoi
- (Vietnam) CPV General Secretary, Nguyễn Phú Trọng and other top Vietnamese politicians
- Prime Minister of Cambodia, Hun Sen
- Vice President of Laos, Phankham Viphavanh
- Deputy Prime Minister of Singapore, Teo Chee Hean
- Deputy Prime Minister of Malaysia, Wan Azizah Wan Ismail
- Chief of Staff to the State Councillor of Myanmar, Thaung Tun
- Special Envoy of the President of Indonesia, Ma'ruf Amin
- Deputy Prime Minister of Thailand, Chatchai Sarikulya
- Member of the Politburo Standing Committee of China, Zhao Leji
- Prime Minister of South Korea, Lee Nak-yeon
- Minister of Justice of Japan, Yoko Kamikawa and Secretary General of the LDP, Toshihiro Nikai
- Former President of Mozambique, Armando Guebuza
- Vice President of the State Duma of Russia, Olga Epifanova
- Speaker of the Council of Belarus, Mikhail Myasnikovich
- Vice President of Cuba, Roberto Morales Ojeda

and several ambassadors and diplomats from 50 other countries and organizations.

On 29 September, the United Nations General Assembly held a minute of silence to mourn his death.

=== Reactions ===
General Secretary of the Chinese Communist Party Xi Jinping extended "the deepest condolences". "Comrade Tran Dai Quang was an outstanding Party and state leader of Vietnam, and made great contributions to the development, renovation and opening-up of Vietnam."

"On behalf of the American people, I express my condolences to his family and the people of Vietnam," said President Donald Trump. "President Quang was a great friend of the United States. He graciously hosted me during my historic state visit to Hanoi in November 2017, and I am grateful for his personal commitment to deepening the United States-Vietnam Comprehensive Partnership".

Japanese Prime Minister Shinzo Abe extended "deepest condolences". "His Excellency devoted himself to the friendly relations between the two countries," Abe said.

== Published works ==
- "Cyberspace – Future and Action", 2015
- The people have the strength to protect the National Security, 2015

Political offices
Preceded by Trương Tấn Sang	President of Vietnam; 2016–2018	Succeeded by Đặng Thị Ngọc Thịnh; Acting
Government offices
Preceded by Lê Hồng Anh	Minister of Public Security; 2011–2016	Succeeded by Tô Lâm
Order of precedence
Preceded by Nguyễn Phú Trọng as General Secretary of the Communist Party of Vietnam	Rank of the Communist Party of Vietnam; 12th Politburo	Succeeded by Nguyễn Xuân Phúc as Prime Minister of Vietnam
Diplomatic posts
Preceded by Pedro Pablo Kuczynski	Chair of the Asia-Pacific Economic Cooperation; 2017	Succeeded by Peter O'Neill
