= Ngô Thị Mận =

First Lady of Vietnam between 2011 and 2024

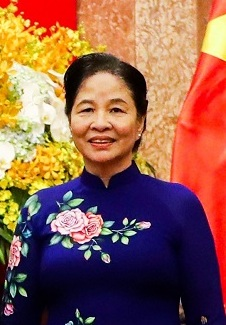
- Mận in 2019

Spouse of the General Secretary of the Communist Party of Vietnam
- In role 19 January 2011 – 19 July 2024
- General Secretary: Nguyễn Phú Trọng
- Preceded by: Lý Thị Bang (2010)
- Succeeded by: Ngô Phương Ly

Spouse of the President of Vietnam
- In role 23 October 2018 – 5 April 2021
- President: Nguyễn Phú Trọng
- Preceded by: Nguyễn Thị Hiền
- Succeeded by: Trần Thị Nguyệt Thu

Personal details
- Born: 26 October 1949 (age 76) Hanoi, North Vietnam (now Vietnam)
- Party: Communist Party of Vietnam
- Spouse: Nguyễn Phú Trọng (m. 1972; died 2024)
- Children: 2

Ngô Thị Mận (born 26 October 1949) is the widow of Vietnam's foremost political leader Nguyễn Phú Trọng, who served as the General Secretary of the Communist Party of Vietnam from 2011 to 2024. Additionally, she was the de facto First Lady of Vietnam during her husband's leadership from 2011 to 2024. She is rumored to have maintained an austere lifestyle despite being married to the most powerful man in Vietnam.

Honorary titles
Preceded by Nguyễn Thị Hiền	Spouse of the President of Vietnam; 2018–2021	Succeeded by Trần Thị Nguyệt Thu
Preceded by Lý Thị Bang	Spouse of the Supreme Leader of Vietnam; 2011–2024	Succeeded by Ngô Phương Ly
