= Nông Thị Xuân =

Unrecognized mistress of Ho Chi Minh

- Born: 1932; Cao Bằng, Tonkin, French Indochina
- Died: 1957 (aged 24–25); Hanoi, North Vietnam
- Cause of death: vehicle accident
- Known for: mistress of Ho Chi Minh

Nông Thị Xuân (Note: In this Vietnamese name, the surname is Nông, but is often simplified to Nong in English-language text. In accordance with Vietnamese custom, this person should be referred to by the given name, Xuân.) (1932–1957) was a mistress of president Ho Chi Minh, who mothered a child with Hồ and died in a vehicle accident shortly after. Xuân was an ethnic Tày from Cao Bằng Province.

Vũ Kỳ, Ho Chi Minh's secretary (who was also mentioned as having a significant role in the story), in an interview in 2004 denied the story by saying that Vũ Thư Hiên's book was based on some unfounded rumors to fictionalize this story.

== Relationship ==
According to Vũ Thư Hiên in the book Đêm giữa ban ngày (Night in Broad Daylight), Xuân was chosen in 1955 to look after the health of uncle Hồ. Xuân and her sister named Vàng stayed at 66 Hàng Bông Thợ Nhuộm street, next to Quang Trung street. Normally, Minister of Security Trần Quốc Hoàn himself took Xuân to meet Hồ, and then drove her back. And that was where she conceived a son with Hồ, named Nguyễn Tất Trung, born in late 1956. The North Vietnamese communist government kept Hồ's relationship with her and others firmly secretive to preserve the cult of personality that was created around Hồ Chí Minh, of his image as "the father of the revolution" and of a "celibate married only to the cause of revolution".

== Death ==
According to Vũ Thư Hiên In 1957, Nông Thị Xuân was killed near Hồ Tây (West Lake), Hà Nội under the communist party's orders to stop them from marrying, but there are two accounts about how she died, both involving intentional vehicular collision. The first account was that when she asked one of Hồ's associates to have her relationship be publicly acknowledged by the government, expressing her desire to be Hồ's wife and North Vietnam's First Lady, the Communist Party of Vietnam objected to it and ordered Trần Quốc Hoàn (Head Director General of the Ministry of Security – Bộ Công an) to eliminate her. Trần Quốc Hoàn raped her repeatedly and then clubbed her to death, with her body dumped on a road to disguise the murder as a vehicle accident. Other accounts of her murder said that she was simply murdered by collision in a premeditated car accident. Communist party officials later attempted to erase all traces of the romance from the public.

Ho Chi Minh was also married to Tăng Tuyết Minh, a southern Chinese midwife, and formerly to Nguyễn Thị Minh Khai, a Vietnamese communist revolutionary from Hồ's home province of Nghệ An.

== Destiny of Nguyễn Tất Trung ==
According to Bùi Tín, former People's Army of Vietnam Colonel and Vice Chief Editor of the People's Daily, after his mother died, Nguyễn Tất Trung was brought home by Nguyễn Lương Bằng, who late became Vice President of Vietnam, to raise for few months in 1957, and then gave him to general Chu Văn Tấn in Thái Nguyên to look after for some years. After that, Trung was brought to the orphanage of Hội phụ nữ cứu quốc trung ương (Women League for National Salvation (WLNS)), and then the Nguyễn Văn Trỗi school for children of soldiers killed in action. After Hồ Chí Minh died, Vũ Kỳ, Hồ's long time secretary (from 1948), brought Trung home to live with his family and sent him to the Chu Văn An school near West Lake together with his 2 sons, Vũ Quang and Vũ Vinh, who were about Trung's age.

When he was 32 years old (Note: This would be 1988) Nguyễn Tất Trung married Lưu Thị Duyên. Both have together a son, born in 1992, at first called Vũ Thanh and then changed into Nguyễn Thanh Trung. Bùi Tín said in 1989, he often came to see Vũ Kỳ and met Trung there. Because of illness, he did not do well at school, so it is hard for Trung to find a job. When they were in good health, the couple opened a coffee shop, behind the station Hàng Cỏ - Hà Nội, and then moved next to the gate of the University of Polytechnics. Later, Trung was granted a house, appointed as an officer on the list, and receive the salary of a colonel. Trung died on June 16, 2026.

== See also ==
- Zeng Xueming
- Nguyễn Thị Minh Khai
- Nông Đức Mạnh
- Dương Thu Hương
- Đêm giữa ban ngày (Vietnamese) – memoirs of Vũ Thư Hiên, the son of Vũ Đình Huỳnh, former secretary of Ho Chi Minh
- Nguyễn Minh Cần (in Vietnamese)
