= Nguyễn Minh Triết =

Sixth President of Vietnam (2006-2011)

His Excellency Nguyễn Minh Triết
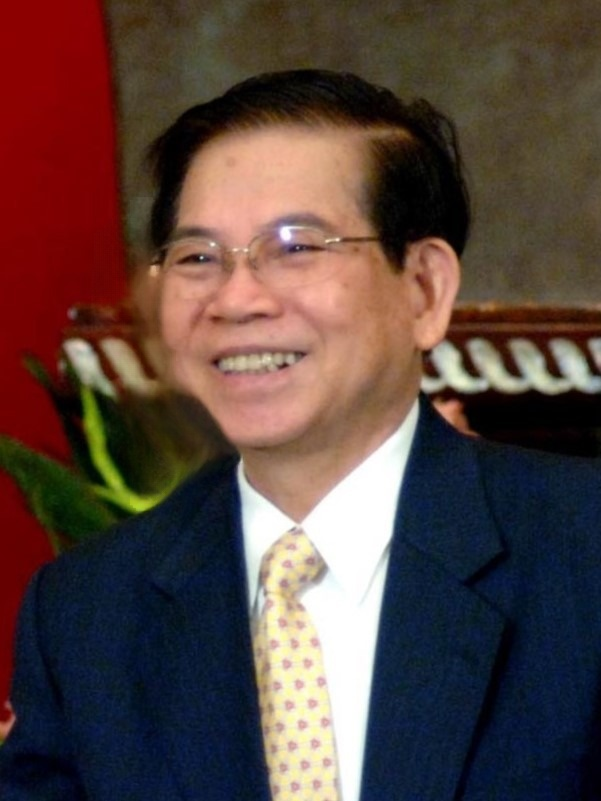
- Nguyễn Minh Triết in 2008

7th President of Vietnam
- In office 27 June 2006 – 25 July 2011
- Prime Minister: Nguyễn Tấn Dũng
- Vice President: Trương Mỹ Hoa; Nguyễn Thị Doan
- Preceded by: Trần Đức Lương
- Succeeded by: Trương Tấn Sang

Party Secretary of Ho Chi Minh City
- In office 6 January 2000 – 27 June 2006
- Preceded by: Trương Tấn Sang
- Succeeded by: Lê Thanh Hải

Head of the Central Mass Mobilization Commission
- In office December 1997 – January 2000
- Preceded by: Phạm Thế Duyệt
- Succeeded by: Trương Quang Được

Party Secretary of Sông Bé
- In office 27 December 1991 – 27 December 1996
- Preceded by: Nguyễn Văn Luông
- Succeeded by: Nguyễn Minh Đức

Personal details
- Born: 8 October 1942 (age 84) Bến Cát, Binh Duong, Vietnam
- Party: Communist Party of Vietnam (1965–2011)
- Spouse: Trần Thị Kim Chi
- Education: Ho Chi Minh City University of Science

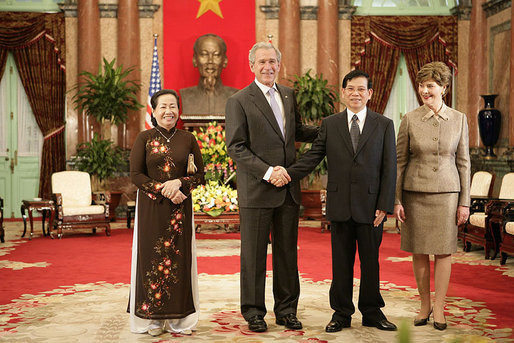
Nguyễn Minh Triết and First Lady Trần Thị Kim Chi meet with George W. Bush and Laura Bush at the President's Palace, November 2006.

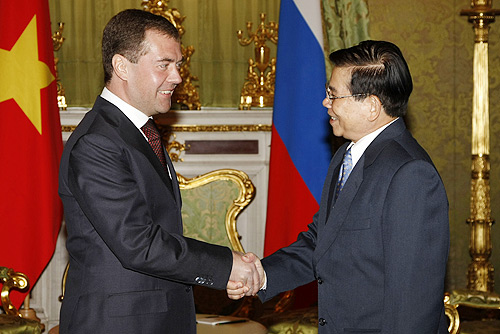
Nguyễn Minh Triết meets with Russian President Dmitry Medvedev in October 2008.

Nguyễn Minh Triết (Vietnamese: [ŋwiən˦ˀ˥ mïŋ˧˧ t͡ɕiət̚˧˦]; born 8 October 1942) is a Vietnamese politician who served as the seventh President of Vietnam from 2006 to 2011. He was elected by the National Assembly of Vietnam with 464 votes (94%) in June 2006.

Nguyễn Minh Triết was previously the secretary of the Communist Party of Vietnam in Ho Chi Minh City. The presidency of Vietnam is a ceremonial position and the Politburo decides government policy. Triết was the fourth-ranking member of the Politburo from 2006 to 2011. His term as president expired in July 2011. Senior Politburo member Trương Tấn Sang succeeded him.

At the 10th Party Congress of the Communist Party of Vietnam in April 2006, he was nominated President of the Socialist Republic of Vietnam and confirmed on 27 June 2006 by the National Assembly. On that day, he succeeded Trần Đức Lương. He subsequently proposed Nguyễn Tấn Dũng as the new prime minister.

== Life and career ==
Nguyễn Minh Triết was born on 8 October 1942 in Bến Cát district in Bình Dương province, in a middle-class farming family. In 1957, he went to Saigon to study at Petrus Ky High School, the leading high school in the south. In 1960 Triết studied Mathematics at the University of Saigon under the South Vietnamese government. Here he began to participate in the student movement against Ngo Dinh Diem's government. Later in 1965, he became a member of the Communist Party of Vietnam in southern Vietnam during the Vietnam War that involving the United States. He is one of the top leaders of Vietnam who are southerners and one of the few that had not regrouped to the North following the division of the country in 1954 (he was only 12 at the time). In 1992, he became party chief of southern Sông Bé Province. He guided the largely agricultural province into an attractive destination for foreign direct investment.

In November 1963, Nguyễn Minh Triết escaped to a war zone working in Sàigòn - Gia Định. He then worked as an accountant and researcher at the Central Committee of the Revolutionary People's Revolutionary Youth Union. On 30 March 1965, Triết was admitted to the Southern Revolutionary People's Party under alias Trần Phong also known as Sáu Phong, and was appointed secretary of the Youth Union Central Committee of the People's Revolutionary League in South Central Committee and went to the battlefield in Mỹ Tho Province until 1973. From 1974 to August 1979 he was Deputy Head of the Central Youth Union and Deputy Director of the young Volunteers of the Central Union. In September 1979, he was sent to study at the Nguyễn Ái Quốc Party School and graduated with a Bachelor of Political Science in July 1981. From July 1981 to December 1987, he held the posts of Head of the Youth Volunteer Youth Union; then the head of the Central Committee of the Union; Secretary of the Central Party Committee of the Union in Ho Chi Minh City; Member of the Central Executive Committee; Secretary of the Central Committee of the Ho Chi Minh Communist Youth Union; Vice Chairman, General Secretary of Vietnam’s Youth Union.

He ascended to the Politburo in 1997 and became Party head of Ho Chi Minh City in 2000. In that position, he oversaw a campaign against organized crime and corruption, including the arrest and execution of underworld kingpin Trương Văn Cam, known as Năm Cam.

== Leadership in provinces and cities in Southern Vietnam economic region ==
From January 1988 to September 1989, Nguyễn Minh Triết was appointed as the Provincial Party Committee Member of Sông Bé Provincial Party Committee. From October 1989 to December 1991, Triết was appointed Deputy Secretary of Provincial Party Committee of, Bình dương and Bình Phước provinces. In the early years of economic renovation, Bình Dương and Ho Chi Minh City were fast growing places, attracting a lot of foreign investment capital. At the 7th National Congress of the Communist Party of Vietnam in June 1991, he was elected to the Central Committee of the Communist Party of Vietnam and served as a member of the Central Committee of the Communist Party. At this conference, he formally renamed Nguyễn Minh Triết. In December 1991, he was elected Secretary of Sông Bé Provincial Party Committee and held the post until December 1996. In July 1992, he was elected Member of the 9th National Assembly as a representative of Sông Bé province. Then, in June 1996, he was re-elected as a member of the Central Committee of the Party at the 8th National Party Congress.

In January 1997, Nguyễn Minh Triết was appointed Deputy Secretary of the Ho Chi Minh City Party Committee. At that time, the Party Secretary was Trương Tấn Sang, Member of the Politburo. In December of the same year, he joined with Nguyễn Phú Trọng, Phan Diễn, and Phạm Thanh Ngân in the Fourth Plenum of the Executive Committee, in addition to the Politburo. Triết was assigned to be the head of the Central Mobilization Committee. After he moved to another job, Trương Quang Được and Tòng Thị Phóng respectively, Hà Thị Khiết (after the 9th Congress) were assigned to hold the position. In January 2000, Nguyễn Minh Triết was promoted to the position of Party Secretary of Ho Chi Minh City. At the 9th National Party Congress, he was elected to the Central Party Committee and was elected to the Politburo by the Central Committee (April 2001). In May 2002, he was again elected to the 11th National Assembly, but as a delegate of Ho Chi Minh City. In April 2006, he was re-elected as Member of the Politburo 20th.

== Elected president and some activities ==
On 27 June 2006, Nguyễn Minh Triết was elected by the 9th session of the 11th National Assembly as president of the Socialist Republic of Vietnam with the following votes: 464 votes. The result of the election was announced later: Triết officially became the new president with 94.12% of votes (464 delegates).

In June 2007, as president, he made an official visit to the United States at the invitation of President George W. Bush. During this trip, Nguyễn Minh Triết met about 800 businessmen in Orange County, California, most of them were of Vietnamese descent. Here he talked about the Vietnamese people, national unity, as well as the fact that the Vietnamese government was not prejudiced by people with different views. There he met with opposition from about two thousand Vietnamese Americans living there, because they believed that the Vietnamese government violated human rights. Also on this trip, he was considered to have altered many of the long-held stereotypes of the US Congressmen with their calm, clever answer, releasing many complex issues. Especially answered the speeches of House Speaker Nancy Pelosi.

== Quotes ==
"We fought hard for socialism in a devastating war of independence and reunification. To build an affluent and prosperous society, we chose the path of a Socialist-oriented market economy. We have achieved strong economic growth, and yet the sense of solidarity in our society has not been lost. This is very important to people".

Political offices
Preceded by Trần Đức Lương	President of Vietnam; 2006–2011	Succeeded by Trương Tấn Sang
Diplomatic posts
Preceded by Roh Moo-hyun	Chairperson of APEC; 2006	Succeeded by John Howard
Preceded by Abhisit Vejjajiva	Chairperson of ASEAN; 2010	Succeeded by Susilo Bambang Yudhoyono
