= Nong, Iran =

Nong ننگ
- Village
- Location within Iran
- Coordinates: 27°21′13″N 56°27′20″E
- Country: Iran
- Province: Hormozgan
- County: Bandar Abbas
- Bakhsh: Qaleh Qazi
- Rural District: Sarkhun

Population (2006)
  - Total: 442
- Time zone: UTC+3:30 (IRST)
  - Summer (DST): UTC+4:30 (IRDT)

Nong (Persian: ننگ; also known as Nang-e Pā’īn and Nong-e Pā’īn) is a village in Sarkhun Rural District, Qaleh Qazi District, Bandar Abbas County, Hormozgan Province, Iran. At the 2006 census, its population was 442, in 106 families.
