= Zeng Xueming =

Wife of Hồ Chí Minh

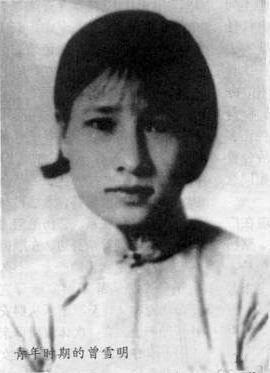
- Zeng c. 1920s
- Born: Zeng Xueming; October 1905; Canton, Great Qing
- Died: 14 November 1991 (aged 86); Guangzhou, China
- Other name: Tăng Tuyết Minh
- Spouse: Nguyễn Sinh Cung (m. 1926; sep. 1931)

Chinese name
- Chinese: 曾雪明
Transcriptions
Standard Mandarin
- Hanyu Pinyin: Zēng Xuěmíng
- Wade–Giles: Tseng^{1} Hsüeh^{3}-ming^{2}
- Yale Romanization: Dzēng Sywěmíng
- IPA: [tsə́ŋ ɕyɤ̀mǐŋ]
Yue: Cantonese
- Yale Romanization: Jāng Syut-mìhng
- Jyutping: Zang^{1} Syut^{3}-ming^{4}

Vietnamese name
- Vietnamese alphabet: Tăng Tuyết Minh
- Chữ Hán: 曾雪明

Zeng Xueming (Chinese: 曾雪明; October 1905 – 14 November 1991), known in Vietnamese as Tăng Tuyết Minh, was a Chinese midwife. She was a Catholic from Guangzhou and it was claimed that she married Nguyễn Ái Quốc (a pseudonym used by Vietnamese communist leader Hồ Chí Minh) in October 1926. They lived together until April 1927, when Hồ fled China following an anti-communist coup. Despite several attempts to renew contact by both Zeng and Hồ, the couple never reunited. Zeng and Hồ were never legally divorced, nor was their marriage ever annulled. There is uncertainty of true happenings as some say it was a marriage of convenience to avoid Hồ's political persecution during his time in Kuomintang-ruled China, whilst others say the story was never true to begin with, and was only a hypothesis.

== Biography ==
Zeng was born into a Catholic family in Guangzhou in October 1905. She was the youngest daughter in a family of ten children, including seven girls. Her mother's surname was Liang (梁). Her father, a businessman from Meixian, Guangdong, named Zeng Kaihua (曾開華), died in 1915. As the daughter of a concubine, she was expelled from her father's house when he died. In these difficult circumstances, she was befriended by the wife of Vietnamese communist Lam Duc Thu. She learned to be a midwife at a school in Guangzhou and graduated in 1925 at the age of 20.

At this time, Vietnam was part of French Indochina, with communist and nationalist political activity targeted by the local Sûreté, the Indochinese branch of the French national police. Hồ arrived in Guangzhou in November 1924 on a boat from Vladivostok. He posed as a Chinese citizen named Li Shui (Ly Thuy) and worked as a translator for Comintern agent and Soviet arms dealer Mikhail Borodin. In May 1925, Hồ participated in the founding of Thanh Nien, or Vietnamese Revolutionary Youth Association. This group was a forerunner of today's Vietnamese Communist Party.

In 1925, Zeng was introduced to Hồ by Thụ. Thụ was at this time active in Thanh Nien, although he was later exposed as an informer to the Sûreté. Hồ later gave Zeng a ruby engagement ring. When Ho's comrades objected to the match, he told them, "I will get married despite your disapproval because I need a woman to teach me the language and keep house." The couple were married on 18 October 1926. The legal witnesses were Cai Chang and Deng Yingchao, wife of future Chinese Premier Zhou Enlai. Zeng was 21 and Hồ was 36. The wedding took place in the same building where Zhou had married Deng earlier. They then lived together at Borodin's residence. Hồ was overjoyed when he learned that Zeng was pregnant in late 1926. However, Zeng obtained an abortion on the advice of her mother, who feared that Hồ might be forced to leave China.

On 12 April 1927, KMT leader Chiang Kai-shek staged an anti-communist coup in Shanghai and other cities. Hồ went into hiding and fled to Hong Kong on 5 May. Chinese police raided his residence in Guangzhou on the same day. Hồ then traveled to various countries, finally arriving in Bangkok in July 1928. In August, he sent a letter to Zeng: "Although we have been separated for almost a year, our feelings for each other do not have to be said in order to be felt. At present, I am taking advantage of this opportunity to send you a few words to reassure you, and also to send my greetings and good wishes to your mother." This letter was intercepted by the Sûreté. Although she was uninterested in politics, Zeng is recorded as a member of the (Chinese) Communist Youth League from July 1927 to June 1929. According to one report, Zeng visited Hồ in the winter of 1929–1930 when he was in Hong Kong. In May 1930, Hồ sent a letter asking Zeng to meet him in Shanghai, but her boss hid the letter and she did not receive it in time. Hồ was arrested by British police in Hong Kong on 6 June 1931. Unknown to him, Zeng attended his court hearing on 10 July 1931, the last time she would see him. To evade a French request for extradition, the British announced in 1932 that Hồ was dead and later released him.

In May 1950, Zeng saw a picture of Hồ in a newspaper and learned that he had become president of the Democratic Republic of Vietnam (North Vietnam). She then sent a message to the DRV ambassador in Beijing. This message was unanswered. She tried again in 1954, but her letter was again unanswered. Representatives of the Chinese government told her to stop trying to contact Hồ and promised to provide for her needs. By this time, a cult of personality had arisen around Hồ and the North Vietnamese government had an investment in the myth of his celibacy, said to symbolize his total devotion to the revolution. For his part, Hồ asked the North Vietnamese consul in Guangzhou to look up Zeng in 1967, but without success. Hồ died in September 1969. Zeng retired as a midwife in 1977 and in 1979, the Guangdong Provincial Communist Party Committee provided her with a living allowance and assistance for her. She died 14 November 1991 at the age of 86, and was cremated and her ashes scattered at sea.

== Research and reaction ==
The claim that Hồ had a Chinese wife first appeared in a book by Chinese author Huang Zheng published in 1987. This claim went unnoticed until the book was translated into Vietnamese in 1990. Also in 1990, French author Daniel Hémery found Ho's letters to Zeng in the Centre des Archives d’Outre-Mer, the French colonial archive. In May 1991, the editor-in-chief of Tuoi Tre Vũ Kim Hạnh was summarily dismissed from her post after the newspaper published a story about Ho's marriage. William Duiker's Ho Chi Minh: A Life (2000) presents additional CAOM documentation for the relationship. The government requested substantial cuts in the official Vietnamese translation of Duiker's book, which was refused, preventing the translation from being published. In 2002, the Vietnamese government suppressed a review of Duiker's book in the Far Eastern Economic Review.

Chu Đức Tính, Director of the Hồ Chí Minh Museum, in an interview with the newspaper Tuổi Trẻ said that he and his colleagues at the museum have debated many times with Huang Zheng, the first person who published about Zeng Xueming's marriage to Ho. He characterized it as a rumor heard on the Internet and concluded that "this is a hypothesis that is more fiction than not" and said "the facts have proven that it is not true."

== See also ==
- Nông Thị Xuân
- Nguyễn Thị Minh Khai
- Nông Đức Mạnh
- Dương Thu Hương
