= Trương Tấn Sang =

President of Vietnam from 2011 to 2016

His Excellency Trương Tấn Sang
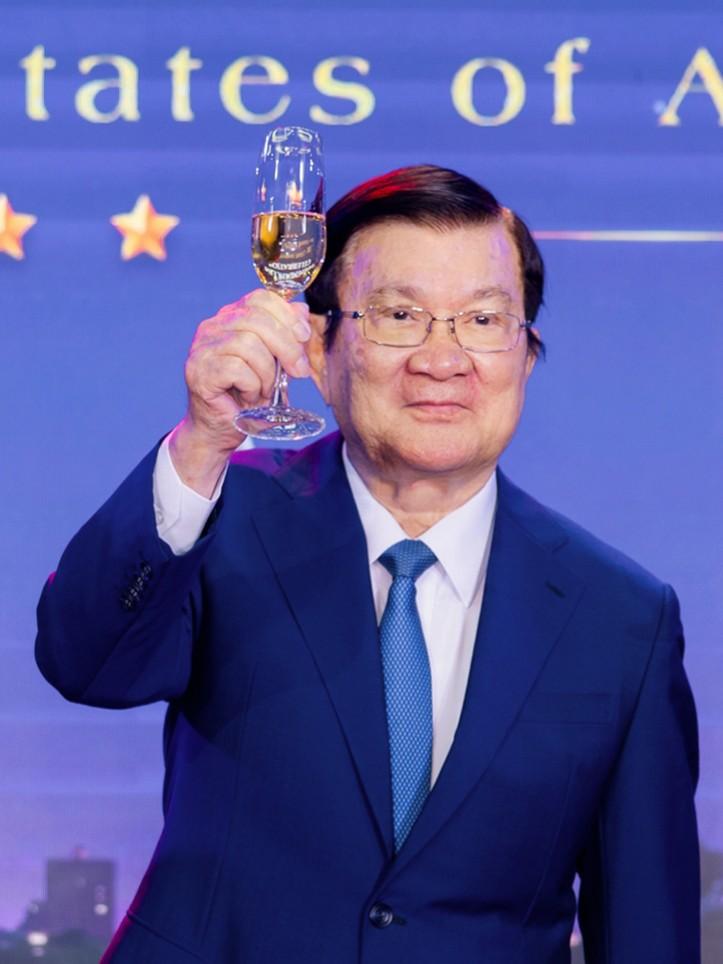
- Trương Tấn Sang in 2026

8th President of Vietnam
- In office 25 July 2011 – 2 April 2016
- Prime Minister: Nguyễn Tấn Dũng
- Vice President: Nguyễn Thị Doan
- Preceded by: Nguyễn Minh Triết
- Succeeded by: Trần Đại Quang

Permanent Member of the Party Central Committee's Secretariat
- In office May 2006 – 3 August 2011
- Preceded by: Phan Diễn
- Succeeded by: Lê Hồng Anh

Head of the Party Central Economic Commission
- In office January 2000 – 11 April 2007
- Preceded by: Phan Diễn
- Succeeded by: Vương Đình Huệ (2012)

Party Secretary of Ho Chi Minh City
- In office 28 October 1996 – January 2000
- Preceded by: Võ Trần Chí
- Succeeded by: Nguyễn Minh Triết

Chairman of the Ho Chi Minh City People's Committee
- In office March 1991 – June 1996
- Preceded by: Nguyễn Vĩnh Nghiệp
- Succeeded by: Võ Viết Thanh

President of the Vietnam Red Cross Society
- In office 5 July 2012 – 16 August 2017
- Preceded by: Trần Đức Lương
- Succeeded by: Trần Đại Quang

Personal details
- Born: 21 January 1949 (age 77) Đức Hòa District, Long An, Cochinchina, State of Vietnam
- Party: Communist Party of Vietnam (1969–present)
- Spouse: Mai Thị Hạnh
- Education: National Academy of Public Administration

Trương Tấn Sang (Vietnamese: [t͡ɕɨəŋ˧˧ tən˧˦ saːŋ˧˧]; born 21 January 1949) is a Vietnamese politician, who served as the eighth President of Vietnam from 2011 to 2016. He was one of Vietnam's top leaders, alongside prime minister Nguyễn Tấn Dũng and Party general secretary Nguyễn Phú Trọng. In July 2011, Trương Tấn Sang was elected state president of the Socialist Republic of Vietnam by the National Assembly of Vietnam and nominated by his predecessor Nguyễn Minh Triết who retired from office.

Trương Tấn Sang was also ranked second after General Secretary of the Communist Party of Vietnam Nguyễn Phú Trọng on the party's Central Secretariat, a body which directs policy making. Sang has been a member of the Central Politburo, the executive committee of the Communist Party, since 1996. He was Communist Party secretary for Ho Chi Minh City from 1996 to 2000. He was promoted to the national party's number two slot in October 2009. There were reports of rivalry between Trương Tấn Sang and Prime Minister Nguyễn Tấn Dũng, and each was backed by a faction within the party.

At the 11th National Congress of the Communist Party of Vietnam in January 2011, Trương Tấn Sang was nominated President of the Socialist Republic of Vietnam and confirmed on 25 July 2011 by the National Assembly. On that day, he succeeded Nguyễn Minh Triết. On the same day he proposed Nguyễn Tấn Dũng as the new head of government.

== Early life and career ==
Trương Tấn Sang was born 21 January 1949, in Đức Hòa District in Long An Province.

In 1966 Trương Tấn Sang joined the revolution. From 1966 to 1969 he was leader of the Youth-student movement PK 2. From 1969 to 1971, Trương Tấn Sang was Party Committee member, secretary of Youth Union, in charge of the secret guerrilla group in Đức Hòa District in Long An Province. Trương Tấn Sang joined the Communist Party of Vietnam on 20 December 1969. He was jailed by the South Vietnamese government in 1971 and held in prison at Phú Quốc. He was released under the Paris Peace Treaty in 1973. He received his bachelor of law degree in 1990 from the National Academy of Public Administration.

== Political career ==
From 1983 to 1986, Trương Tấn Sang headed Ho Chi Minh City (HCMC)'s Forestry Department, as well as the city's New Economic Zone Development Department. In 1986, he was promoted to the Standing Board of the city's Party Committee. He became a member of the national party's Central Committee in 1991. In 1992, he became chairman for HCMC, the number two position in the city government. He joined the Politburo in 1997 as its 14th ranking member. He was party secretary for HCMC, the top position in the city government, from 1997 to 2000. He was promoted to 10th position in the national party at a congress in April 2001. He was also appointed head of the party's economic commission at this time.

In 2003, he was reprimanded for failing to act in the Năm Cam corruption scandal when he headed the city government. Sang was promoted to fifth position in the party at a congress in April 2006. At this congress, he was also appointed Permanent Member of the Party Central Committee's Secretariat, a position which supervises the membership and the internal structure of the party.

== Climb to leadership ==
Trương Tấn Sang was promoted to the party's number two slot between congresses in October 2009. His authority soon eclipsed that of General Secretary Nông Đức Mạnh, the only person nominally above Sang in the party hierarchy, according to a leaked diplomatic cable by U.S. Ambassador Michael Michalak.

Sang "assumed many of Manh's normal responsibilities," Michalak wrote. At diplomatic meetings, Sang could "comment authoritatively, in detail and without notes," whereas Mạnh "appeared disengaged" while he read a 30-minute prepared statement "verbatim and in a monotone." A BBC story described rivalry between Sang and Prime Minister Dũng and described their relationship as "stormy." Michalak described both Sang and Dũng as "pragmatic" and "market-oriented." Both are southerners, but traditionally the party's top slot has gone to a northerner. Nguyễn Phú Trọng, a northerner, was appointed General Secretary of the Communist Party of Vietnam at 11th National Congress held in Hanoi in January 2011. The congress selected a list of Politburo members, and Sang is ranked first on this list. Following the congress, Trong was named the top ranking member of the party's Secretariat, Vietnam's most powerful decision-making body, while Sang is ranked second.

== Presidency ==
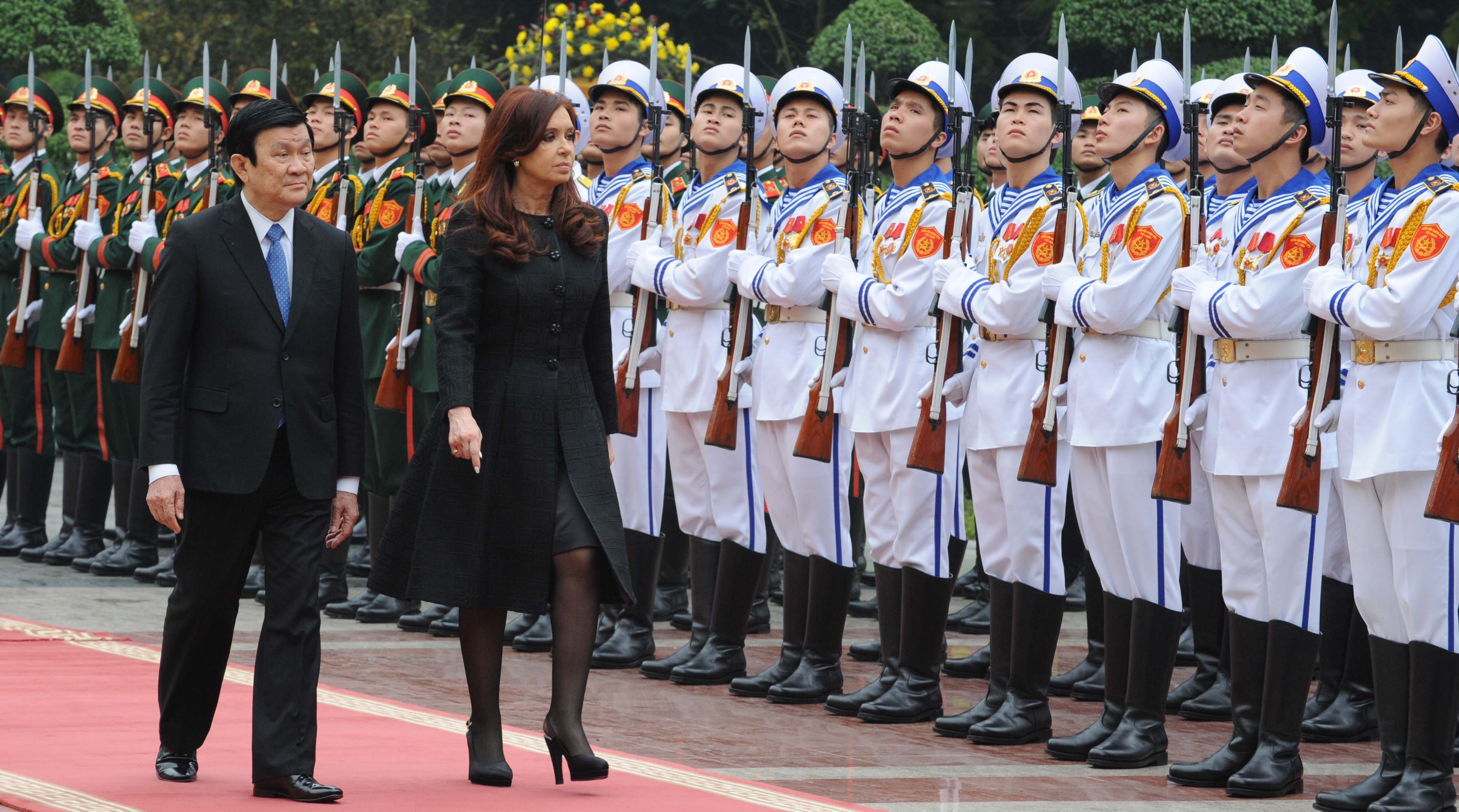
Trương Tấn Sang and Argentine President Cristina Fernández de Kirchner.

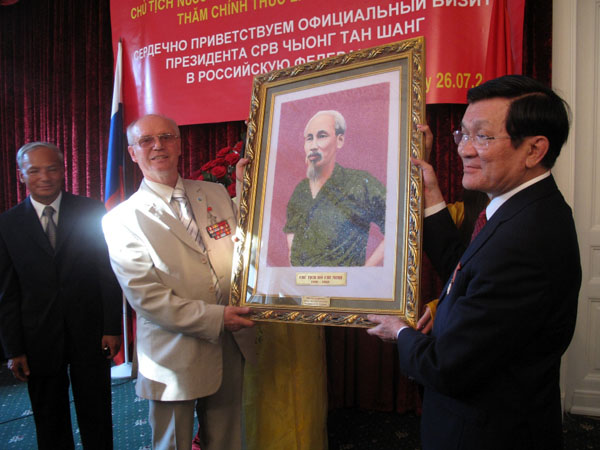
Trương Tấn Sang presenting a portrait of Ho Chi Minh to the leader of veterans of the Soviet specialist mission in Vietnam.

The National Assembly of Vietnam elected Trương Tấn Sang as state president on 25 July 2011 with 97.4 percent of the vote. The term of office is five years. Sang told the Assembly that he would defend Vietnam's independence and territorial integrity, and would resolve the Spratly Islands dispute with China peacefully. As the new president, he will work to set a foundation that will allow Vietnam to become an industrialized and modernized country by 2020, Sang told the Assembly.

Under party regulations, the president is under the authority of Secretariat, so the position is ceremonial. Sang's authority derives from his position as the senior member of the Politburo and as the second ranking member of the Secretariat.

On 25 July 2013, Trương Tấn Sang met with US President Barack Obama to discuss bilateral trade between the U.S. and Vietnam.

== Personal life ==
Trương Tấn Sang is married to Mai Thị Hạnh (born 1956), who served ceremonial functions as the First Lady of Vietnam.

== Awards and honors ==
- Order of José Martí (Cuba, 2015)

== See also ==
- List of presidents of Vietnam
- Human rights in Vietnam

Party political offices
Preceded by Phan Dien	Permanent Member of the Party Central Committee's Secretariat; 2006–2011	Succeeded by Lê Hồng Anh
Political offices
Preceded by Nguyễn Minh Triết	President of Vietnam; 2011–2016	Succeeded by Trần Đại Quang
