= President of Vietnam =

Head of state

President of the Socialist Republic of Vietnam
- Chủ tịch nước Cộng hoà xã hội chủ nghĩa Việt Nam
- Presidential Seal

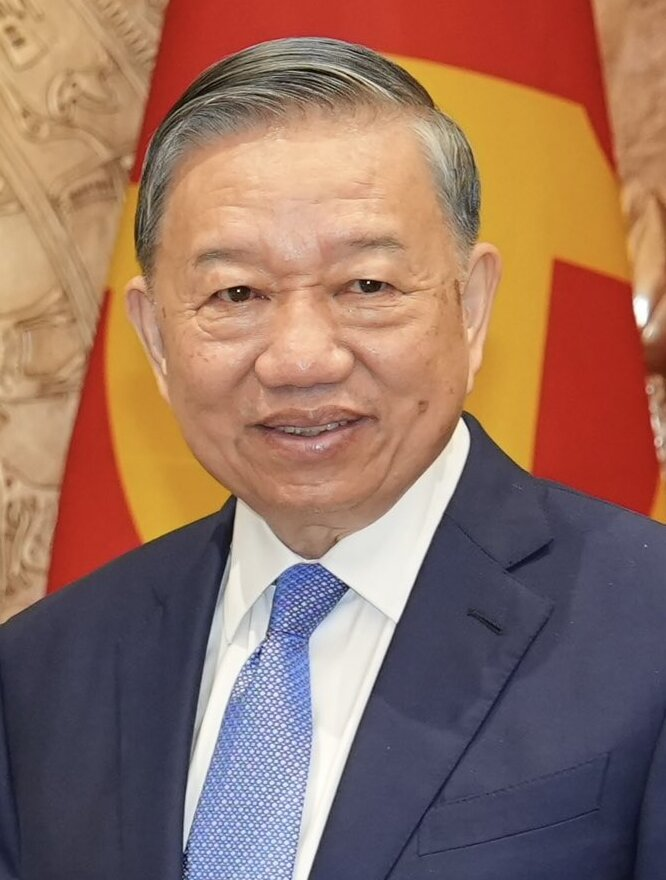
- Incumbent; Tô Lâm since 7 April 2026
- Type: Head of state
- Status: Second highest ranking official (Note: Rank after the General Secretary of the Communist Party.)
- Abbreviation: CTN
- Member of: Central Committee of the Communist Party; Central Police Party Committee; Central Military Commission; National Assembly; National Defense and Security Council
- Residence: Presidential Palace (ceremonial); Tonkin Palace (official)
- Nominator: Standing Committee of the National Assembly
- Appointer: National Assembly
- Term length: Five years, no term limits
- Constituting instrument: Constitution of Vietnam (2014)
- Precursor: President of the Democratic Republic of Vietnam (1976); Chairman of the Consultative Council of the Republic of South Vietnam (1976); Chairman of the Council of State of the S.R. Vietnam (1992)
- Formation: January 1946; 80 years ago
- Unofficial names: State President
- Deputy: Vice President
- Salary: 30,420,000₫ monthly
- Website: Official website (Vietnamese)

The President of the Socialist Republic of Vietnam (Vietnamese: Chủ tịch nước Cộng hoà Xã hội chủ nghĩa Việt Nam, Chủ tịch nước and State President for short) is the head of state of Vietnam. As head of state, the president represents Vietnam domestically and internationally, and maintains the regular and coordinated operation and stability of the central government and safeguards the independence and territorial integrity of the country. The presidency is generally considered to hold the second-highest position in the political system, practically after the general secretary of the Communist Party of Vietnam.

The president must be a member of the National Assembly of Vietnam. The president has traditionally been a member of the Central Committee of the Communist Party and a member of the Politburo. The Central Committee nominates candidates to the Standing Committee of the National Assembly, which then confirms and nominates those candidates for official election by all delegates of the National Assembly. The president appoints the vice president, prime minister, ministers, and other officials with the consent of the National Assembly. The president is the nominal supreme commander-in-chief of the Vietnam People's Armed Forces and chairman of the National Defense and Security Council. The president is also a member of the Central Military Commission and the Central Police Party Committee which are headed by the Party general secretary. Since September 2011, the president is also the chairman of the Party's Central Steering Committee for Judicial Reform.

The powers and prestige of the office of president have varied over the years. For instance, while the inaugural president, Hồ Chí Minh, was also the chairman of the Communist Party, making him (in that capacity) the first ranking member of the Politburo, the highest decision-making body in Vietnam, his successor, Tôn Đức Thắng, was not a member of the Politburo and served as a symbolic figure under General Secretary Lê Duẩn. Since Trường Chinh's ascension to the presidency, the president has been ranked 1st (if concurrently served as General Secretary) or 2nd in the order of precedence of the Communist Party's Politburo, except for President Nguyễn Minh Triết (who ranked fourth) and President Võ Chí Công (who ranked third). Four persons have served concurrently as head of the party and state: Hồ Chí Minh (1951–1969), Trường Chinh (1986), Nguyễn Phú Trọng (2018–2021), and Tô Lâm (2024 and 2026 onwards).

The tenure of the presidency is five years, and a president can only serve three terms. If the president becomes unable to discharge duties of office, the vice president will assume the acting presidency on an interim basis until the president resumes duty, or until the election of a new president by the National Assembly. Vice President Võ Thị Ánh Xuân served as acting president of Vietnam twice, in 2023 and 2024. (Note: Xuân has assumed the acting presidency twice: the first time between the resignation of Nguyễn Xuân Phúc on 18 January 2023 and the election of Võ Văn Thưởng on 2 March 2023, and the second time between the resignation of Võ Văn Thưởng on 21 March 2024 and the election of Tô Lâm on 22 May 2024.) Her predecessor, Đặng Thị Ngọc Thịnh, was the first woman in Vietnamese history to assume the (acting) presidency following the death of President Trần Đại Quang in 2018. Tô Lâm is the incumbent president of Vietnam, serving in this role since 7 April 2026, succeeding Lương Cường.

== History ==
Hồ Chí Minh was appointed Vietnam's first president in 1946 by the National Assembly. The 1959 Constitutions stated that the National Assembly had the power to appoint and dismiss the president. The president represented Vietnam internally and externally. The power and responsibilities of the president in 1946 constitution is somewhat similar to the power and responsibilities of the president of the United States with elements from the president of France being the head of state and the head of government. The 1959 constitution reduced the power of the president, making the president the de jure leader of Vietnam while handling most of the de facto power to the post of general secretary of the Central Committee of the Communist Party of Vietnam. The 1980 constitution transformed the office of head of state. The office of president was abolished and replaced with the office of Chairman of the Council of State (CC). The CC chairmanship was modelled after the Soviet office of Chairman of the Presidium of the Supreme Soviet. The Council of State, as with the Council of Ministers, was a collective decision-making body. The Council of State and the Council of Ministers were part of the executive branch; the strengthening of these institutions weakened the role of the legislative branch.

The importance of the president has not remained constant throughout Vietnamese history. For instance, while Hồ Chí Minh was ranked as first member of the Politburo, the highest decision-making body in Vietnam, his successor, Tôn Đức Thắng, was a symbolic figure with less power. The post of head of state was strengthened in the 1980 Constitution by the appointment of Trường Chinh who was, by order of precedence, the second-highest-ranking member in the Politburo, behind Lê Duẩn. The office of president retained the second highest rank in the Politburo order of precedence until Nguyễn Minh Triết was appointed in 2006; he ranked fourth in the Politburo hierarchy. The Politburo elected in the aftermath of the 11th National Party Congress (held in January 2011) by the Central Committee elected Trương Tấn Sang as the first-ranking member of the Politburo. This was the first time in Vietnamese history where the highest-ranking member of the Politburo does not hold post of either general secretary or chairman (was in existence from 1951 to 1969) of the party. Since Trương Tấn Sang is first-ranked member of the Politburo, he is the body's unofficial head. Politburo meetings are held regularly; decisions within the Politburo are made through collective decision-making, and policies are only enacted if a majority of Politburo members supports them.

== Term of office ==
The president is selected for a term of office of five years. The term of office of the incumbent president continues until the president-elect takes office.

On assuming office, the president takes the following oath before the parliament:

In my capacity as President of the Socialist Republic of Vietnam, I swear complete allegiance to the country, people, and constitution; to fulfill the tasks assigned by the State, and people.

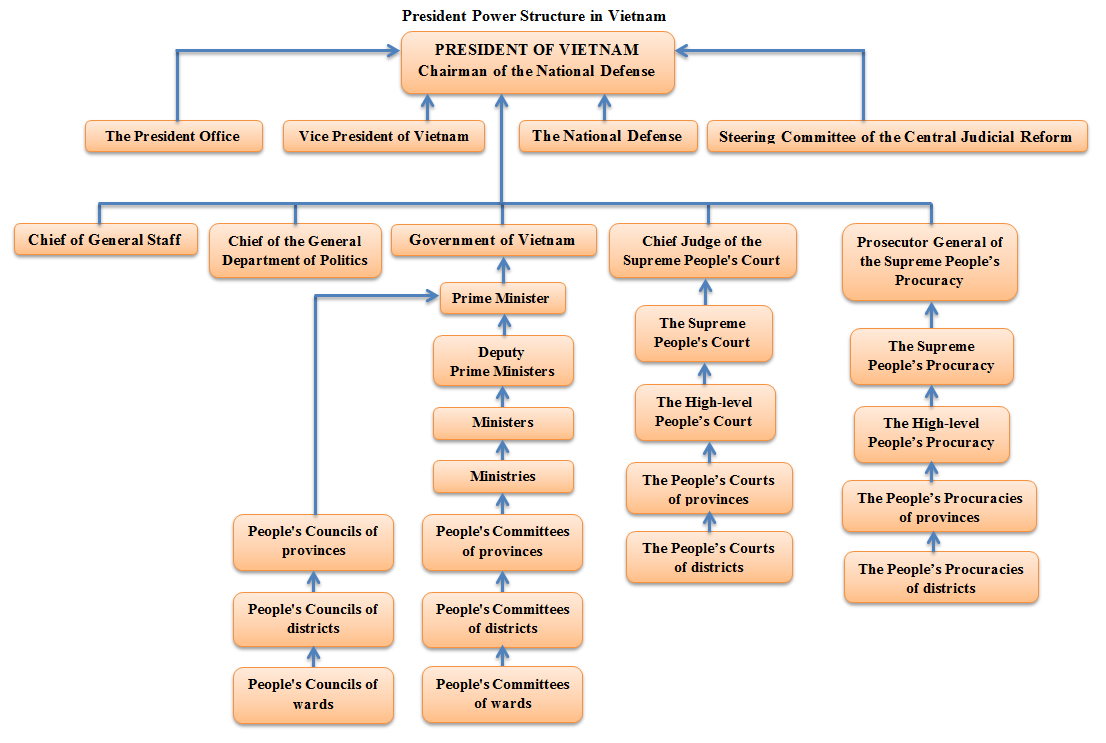

== Duties, powers and responsibilities ==
The president is the head of state of Vietnam, and their main priority is to represent Vietnam internally and externally. The officeholder is elected by the National Assembly of Vietnam, is responsible to it and reports to it. The tenure of the president is five years, the same as that of the National Assembly. The president continues to serve in their functions until the National Assembly elects a successor. The president has the following executive and legislative powers:

- To promulgate laws, decree-laws and the Constitution,
- To suspend the implementation or abrogation of the documents of the prime minister or the deputy prime minister which contravene the Constitution and the Laws
- To act as the country's commander-in-chief and holds the office of Chairman of the National Defense and Security Council of Vietnam,
- To convene meetings of the National Defense and Security Council of Vietnam,
- The president shall take measures to protect the sovereignty of the Socialist Republic of Vietnam its independence and state integrity, and ensure concerted functioning and interaction of all bodies of state power,
- To propose to the National Assembly the election or dismissal from office of the vice president, the prime minister, the chief justice of the Supreme People's Court and the head of the Supreme People's Office of Supervision and Control,
- The president has the right to preside over meetings of the Government of Vietnam,
- To appoint or dismiss officials, staff and employees of the Office of the President,
- To appoint or dismiss deputy prime ministers, ministers and other members of the government,
- To proclaim a state of war or amnesty,
- On the basis of a Standing Committee resolution, the president can order a general or partial mobilisation, or can proclaim a state of emergency nationwide or in a particular region,
- To propose that the Standing Committee review its decree-laws and resolutions on matters stipulated in Points 8 and 9, Article 91, within the space of ten days following their adoption; if those decree-laws and resolutions are again passed by the Standing Committee of the National Assembly with the country's president dissenting, the latter shall report the matter to the National Assembly for it to decide the issue at its nearest session,
- To appoint or dismiss the deputy Chief justice and judges of the Supreme People's Court and the deputy director of the Supreme People's Office of Supervision and Control,
- To appoint or dismiss the chief of general staff, vice chief of general staff, chief of the General Department of Politics and the vice chief of the General Political Department
- To confer titles and ranks on senior officers of the Vietnam People's Armed Forces and bestows "diplomatic titles and ranks, and other State titles and ranks; to confer medals, badges and State honours and distinctions",
- To appoint and recall ambassadors extraordinary and plenipotentiary, and receive foreign ambassadors extraordinary and plenipotentiary, to negotiate and sign international agreements on behalf of the Socialist Republic with the heads of other states; can approve or join international agreements, except in cases where a decision by the National Assembly is necessary,
- To grant Vietnamese nationality, release from Vietnamese nationality, or deprive of Vietnamese nationality,
- To hold Head of Steering Committee of the Central Judicial Reform,
- To supervise the detection and handles all corrupt behaviors,
- To hold Director of the Economic Council.

From the Constitution of Vietnam, the Vietnamese media has described the presidency to be relatively similar to the presidents of Singapore, Germany, Austria...which are mostly ceremonial positions, while the Vietnamese president still have certain executive, judicial and legislative powers as designed by the Constitution. Presidents of Vietnam are regularly one of the top-ranked members of the Politburo of the Communist Party of Vietnam. The former president Võ Văn Thưởng was listed as the fourth-ranking figure in the CPV Politburo, and Nguyễn Phú Trọng served as the state's president from 2018 to 2021 while being the incumbent General Secretary of the Communist Party of Vietnam, the title for the highest-ranking member in the Politburo and in the whole Communist Party of Vietnam that he had held undisrupted since 2011.

== List of presidents by length of tenure ==
Rank	No.	Name	Party	Length of term
1	1	Hồ Chí Minh	ICP/WPV	24 years
2	2	Tôn Đức Thắng	WPV/CPV	10 years, 210 days
3	6	Trần Đức Lương	CPV	8 years, 276 days
4	3	Trường Chinh	CPV	5 years, 349 days
5	4	Võ Chí Công	CPV	5 years, 97 days
6	7	Nguyễn Minh Triết	CPV	5 years, 28 days
7	5	Lê Đức Anh	CPV	5 years
8	8	Trương Tấn Sang	CPV	4 years, 252 days
9	9	Trần Đại Quang	CPV	2 years, 172 days
10	10	Nguyễn Phú Trọng	CPV	2 years, 164 days
11	11	Nguyễn Xuân Phúc	CPV	1 year, 288 days
12	—	Nguyễn Hữu Thọ	CPV	1 year, 96 days
13	12	Võ Văn Thưởng	CPV	1 year, 18 days
14	14	Lương Cường	CPV	1 year, 168 days
15	13	Tô Lâm	CPV	309 days
16	—	Huỳnh Thúc Kháng	None	145 days
17	—	Võ Thị Ánh Xuân	CPV	105 days
18	—	Đặng Thị Ngọc Thịnh	CPV	32 days

== See also ==
- List of presidents of Socialist Vietnam
- List of spouses of Vietnamese presidents
