= Bamboo diplomacy =

Flexible and pragmatic approach to diplomacy

Bamboo diplomacy is a term used to describe an approach to foreign policy characterized by flexibility and pragmatism, employed by smaller nations in their dealings with great powers. It invokes characteristics of the bamboo plant, which bends in the wind to avoid breaking. It has traditionally been used to describe the foreign policy of Thailand, but since 2016 has also been adopted by the Vietnamese government to describe its own version of bamboo diplomacy.
