= Nguyễn Phú Trọng =

Leader of Vietnam from 2011 to 2024

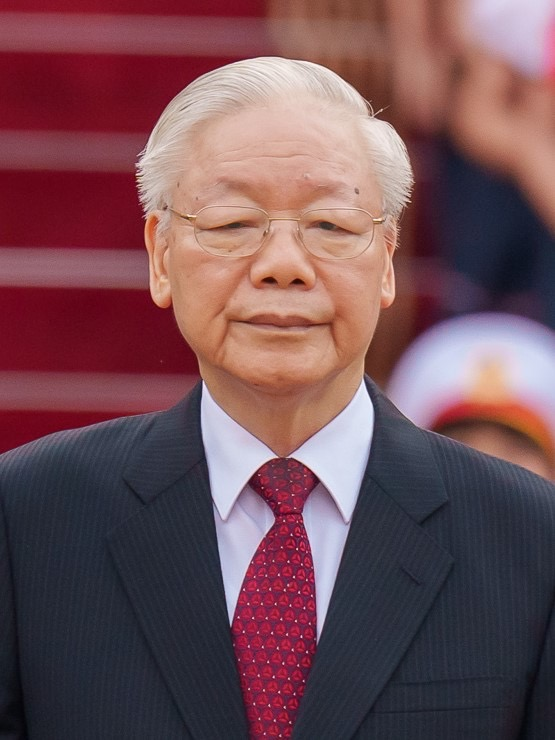
- Trọng in 2023

General Secretary of the Communist Party of Vietnam
- In office 19 January 2011 – 19 July 2024
- Preceded by: Nông Đức Mạnh
- Succeeded by: Tô Lâm

Secretary of the Central Military Commission of the Communist Party
- In office 19 January 2011 – 19 July 2024
- Deputy: Phùng Quang Thanh (2011–2016); Ngô Xuân Lịch (2016–2021); Phan Văn Giang (2021–2024)
- Preceded by: Nông Đức Mạnh
- Succeeded by: Tô Lâm

10th President of Vietnam
- In office 23 October 2018 – 5 April 2021
- Prime Minister: Nguyễn Xuân Phúc
- Vice President: Đặng Thị Ngọc Thịnh
- Preceded by: Trần Đại Quang
- Succeeded by: Nguyễn Xuân Phúc
Additional positions
Chairman of the National Assembly of Vietnam
In office 26 June 2006 – 23 July 2011
| Preceded by | Nguyễn Văn An |
| Succeeded by | Nguyễn Sinh Hùng |
Secretary of the Hanoi Party Committee
In office 6 January 2000 – 26 June 2006
| Preceded by | Lê Xuân Tùng |
| Succeeded by | Phạm Quang Nghị |

Personal details
- Born: 14 April 1944 Đông Anh, Tonkin, French Indochina
- Died: 19 July 2024 (aged 80) Central Military Hospital 108, Hanoi, Vietnam
- Resting place: Mai Dich Cemetery
- Party: CPV
- Spouse: Ngô Thị Mận (m. 1972)
- Children: Nguyễn Trọng Trường (son); Nguyễn Thị Kim Ngọc (daughter)
- Education: University of Hanoi; National Academy of Public Administration; Soviet Academy of Sciences
- Occupation: Politician; professor
- De facto Leader of the Socialist Republic of Vietnam: (First in role); → Tô Lâm (2026)

Nguyễn Phú Trọng (Vietnamese: [ŋwiən˦ˀ˥ fu˧˦ t͡ɕawŋ͡m˧˨ʔ] new-yen foo chong; 14 April 1944 – 19 July 2024) was a Vietnamese politician and political theorist who served as general secretary of the Communist Party of Vietnam from 2011 until his death. As the head of the party's Secretariat, Politburo and Central Military Commission, Trọng was Vietnam's paramount leader. From 2018 to 2021, he also served concurrently as the tenth president of Vietnam.

A conservative Marxist–Leninist, Trọng joined the Communist Party of Vietnam in 1967 and rose through the section devoted to political work. He later joined the party's Central Committee in 1994, its Politburo in 1997 and Vietnam's National Assembly in 2002. Between 2000 and 2006, he was the Party Secretary for Hanoi, effectively the city's highest-ranking position. He served as Chairman of the National Assembly from 2006 to 2011.

Trọng rose to the general secretaryship at the party's 11th National Congress in 2011 and was re-elected at the 12th National Congress in 2016. He became state president in 2018 following the death of President Trần Đại Quang, becoming the third person to simultaneously head the party and state after Hồ Chí Minh (in North Vietnam only) and Trường Chinh. At the 13th National Congress in 2021, he was re-elected as general secretary, becoming the third leader of Vietnam to secure a third term (after Hồ Chí Minh and Lê Duẩn), and was succeeded by Nguyễn Xuân Phúc as president.

During his tenure, Trọng pursued a wide anti-corruption campaign, implicating numerous senior officials to a degree unprecedented in Vietnamese political history. His foreign policy, known as bamboo diplomacy, sought to balance Vietnam's relations with both the United States and China. He presided over a period of rapid economic growth. Trọng is considered one of the most influential Vietnamese leaders since Hồ Chí Minh.

== Early life and career ==
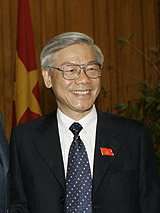
Trọng in 2006

Nguyễn Phú Trọng was born in Đông Hội Commune, Đông Anh district of Hanoi, in 1944. His official biography gives his family background only as "average peasant". He studied philology and earned his bachelor's degree in philology at Vietnam National University, Hanoi, from 1963 to 1967. Trọng joined the Communist Party of Vietnam on 19 December 1967.

Trọng worked for the Tạp chí Cộng Sản (Communist Review), the theoretical and political agency of the Communist Party of Vietnam (formerly the Labor Party) in the periods of 1968–1973, 1976–1981 and 1983–1996. From 1973 to 1976, he underwent a political-economic post-graduate course at the High-level Nguyễn Ái Quốc Party School (now the Hồ Chí Minh National Academy of Politics and Public Administration). From 1991 to 1996, he served as the editor-in-chief of the Tạp chí Cộng Sản. Trọng went to the Soviet Union in 1981 to study at the Academy of Sciences and received a Candidate of Sciences degree in history in 1983. In 1992, Nguyễn Phú Trọng was promoted to Associate Professor and in 2002 was promoted to Professor.

From 1998 to 2001, Trọng was the Vice Chairman of the Central Theoretical Council of the Communist Party of Vietnam, then becoming the chairman of the Theoretical Council until 2006. Trọng was a member of the party's Central Committee from January 1994, the party's Politburo from December 1997 and deputy to the National Assembly from May 2002. From January 2000 to June 2006, Trọng was secretary of the party's executive committee of Hanoi, the de facto head of the city authority. On 26 June 2006, Trọng was elected as the Chairman of the National Assembly. During this period, he was elected secretary of the party organization in the National Assembly and member of the Council for Defence and Security.

== General Secretaryship ==
=== First term (2011–2016) ===
Trọng was elected General Secretary of the Communist Party of Vietnam in 2011 at the 11th National Congress, making him the top leader of Vietnam. The 5th plenum of the 11th Central Committee decided to take the Central Steering Committee for Anti-Corruption away from the Prime Minister's control and Trọng was elected its head.

==== Domestic policy ====
In 2012, he urged the Communist Party of Vietnam (CPV) to adopt Resolution No. 12, which called for party building and self-criticism amongst party officials, calling them to lead by example and be held accountable for corruption and waste. Afterwards, the Central Steering Committee on Anti-corruption was directly placed under the administration of the Politburo. He further passed the Decision 244 of the CPV, establishing a formalized process of political succession and restricting the ability of CPV delegates to select new Central Committee members by requiring the outgoing Central Committee to approve the candidates. It also prohibited Politburo members from nominating Central Committee candidates without support from the Politburo.

==== Foreign policy ====
===== China =====
On 11 October 2011, he made his first visit to China as General Secretary. According to the Vietnamese state news media, General Secretary of the Chinese Communist Party Hu Jintao and Trọng both agreed to avoid escalating the situation in the South China Sea and to handle disagreements through peaceful negotiations. In December 2011, then-Vice President of China Xi Jinping visited Vietnam to "concretize" the results of the October discussions between Trọng and Hu. In 2015, Trọng paid a state visit to China, where he met General Secretary of the Chinese Communist Party Xi Jinping.

===== United States =====
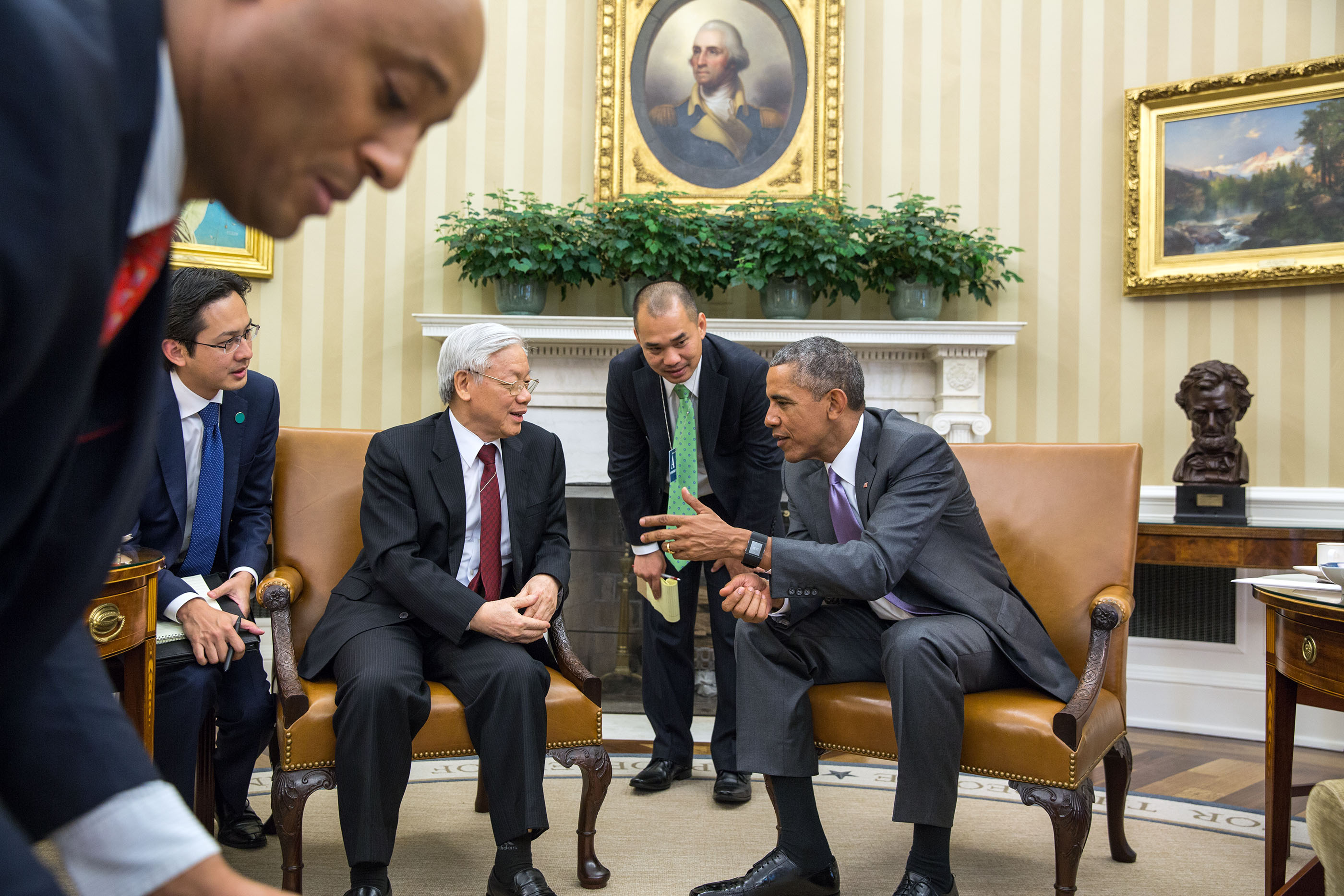
Barack Obama talking to Trọng in 2015

On 6 July 2015, General Secretary Trọng arrived in the United States to begin his United States visit to 10 July 2015. This visit coincided with the milestone of twenty years since the United States and Vietnam normalized diplomatic relations. The talks with President Barack Obama were about human rights, security and defense and the Trans-Pacific Partnership. Trọng was the first Vietnamese party chief to make a state visit to the United States. He also met Vice President Biden and former president Clinton. At a talk at the Center for Strategic and International Studies, he spoke frankly about democracy in Vietnam with American scholars.

===== India =====
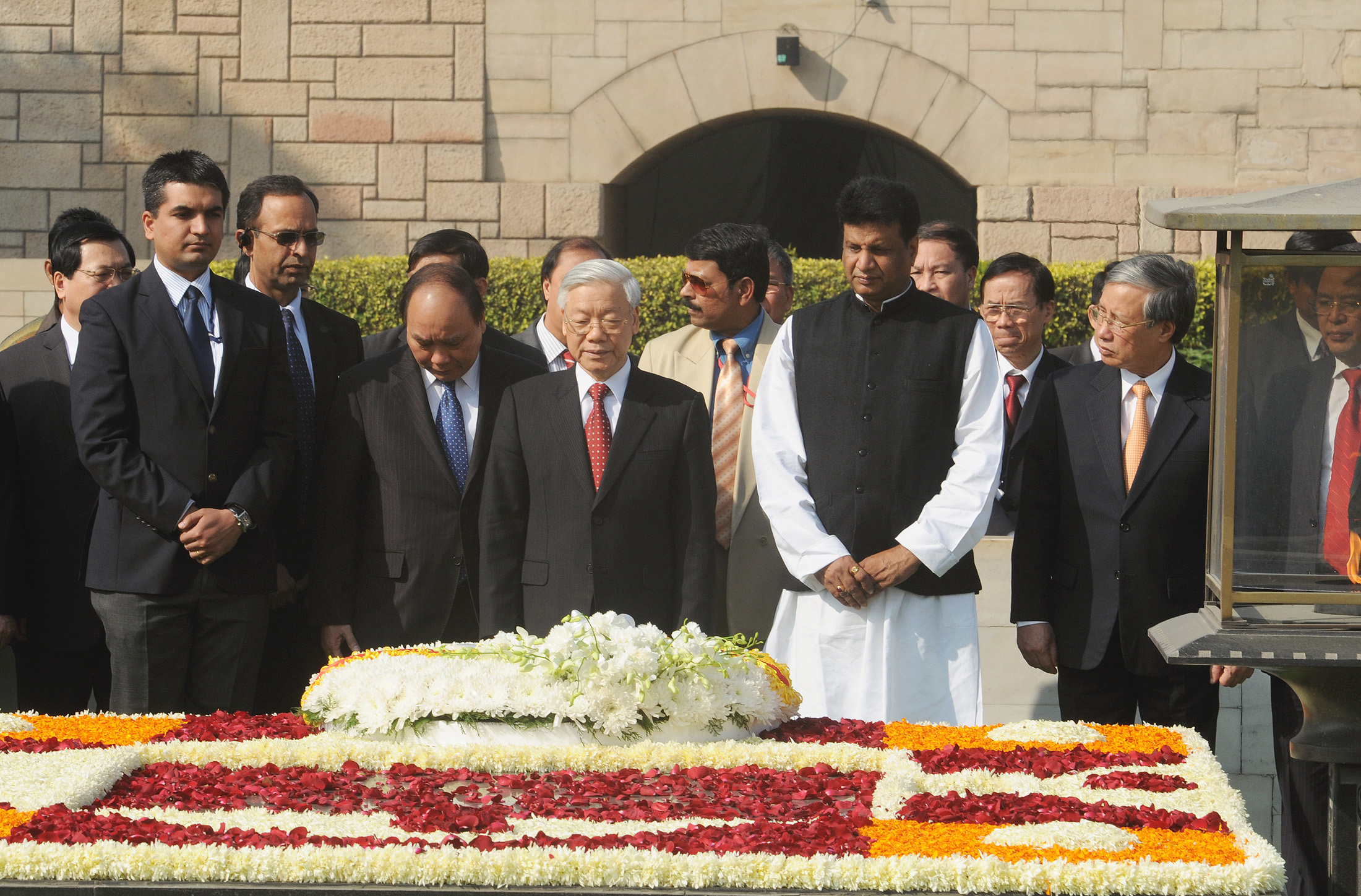
Trọng laying a wreath at the Samadhi of Mahatma Gandhi during his visit to India in 2013

On 20 November 2013, Trọng paid an official visit to India. This State-level visit to India also aims to contribute to strengthening Vietnam-India relations, bringing the strategic partnership between the two countries to a new level, more substantive and more effective.

===== Russia =====
During Trọng's first term, Vietnam and Russia upgraded their relationship to a comprehensive strategic partnership in 2012. Following Russia's annexation of Crimea, Vietnam abstained from voting to declare the annexation through a referendum invalid at the United Nations.

=== Second term (2016–2021) ===
On 27 January 2016, Trọng was re-elected as General Secretary by the 1st Plenary Session of the 12th Central Committee.

In his second term, Trọng launched a large anti-corruption campaign, with the Politburo taking disciplinary actions against 110 senior Party members between 2017 and 2020, including three Politburo members, one former Politburo member, 10 Central Committee members and 17 former Central Committee members. Some of the disciplinary actions included criminal charges.

==== Anti-corruption campaign ====
After being reelected as General Secretary in 2016, Trọng launched a large-scale campaign against corruption. The campaign has resulted in thousands of high-ranking officials being disciplined, imprisoned, and forced to resign from positions in the government, including the president Nguyễn Xuân Phúc, who resigned after several of his subordinates were involved in corruption scandals. He compared this campaign to a burning furnace ("đốt lò"), hence the name Burning Furnace Campaign (Chiến dịch Đốt Lò). The campaign is considered by observers to be an effort by the Party to regain power and prestige as well as strengthen people's trust in the government and the Party's leadership. Especially during his third term, Trọng's government handled many notable corruption cases, such as Việt Á scandal and the 304 trillion dong (12 billion USD) Van Thinh Phat Holdings Group case.

==== Presidency (2018–2021) ====
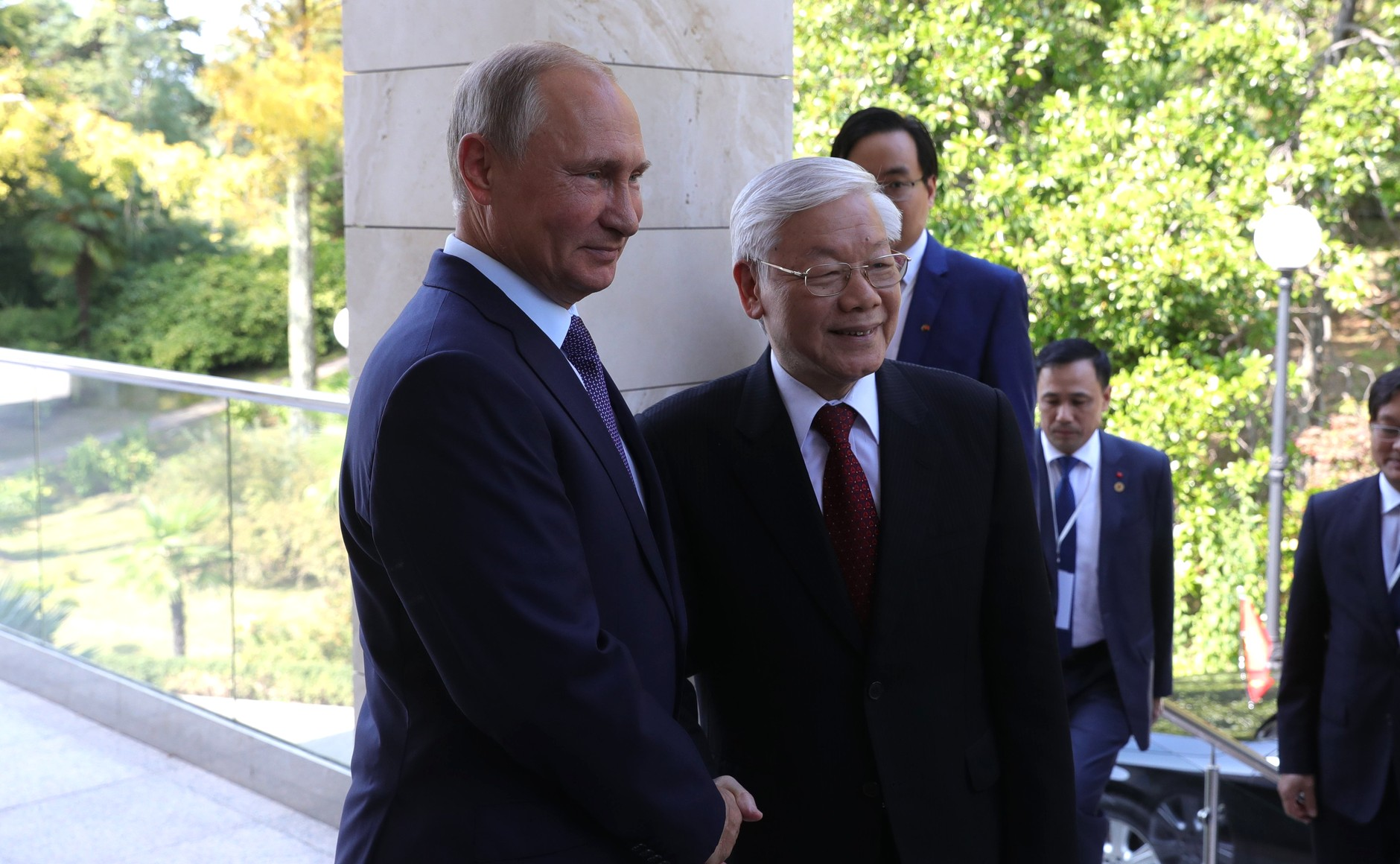
Trọng with Russian president Vladimir Putin in Sochi, Russia, 6 September 2018

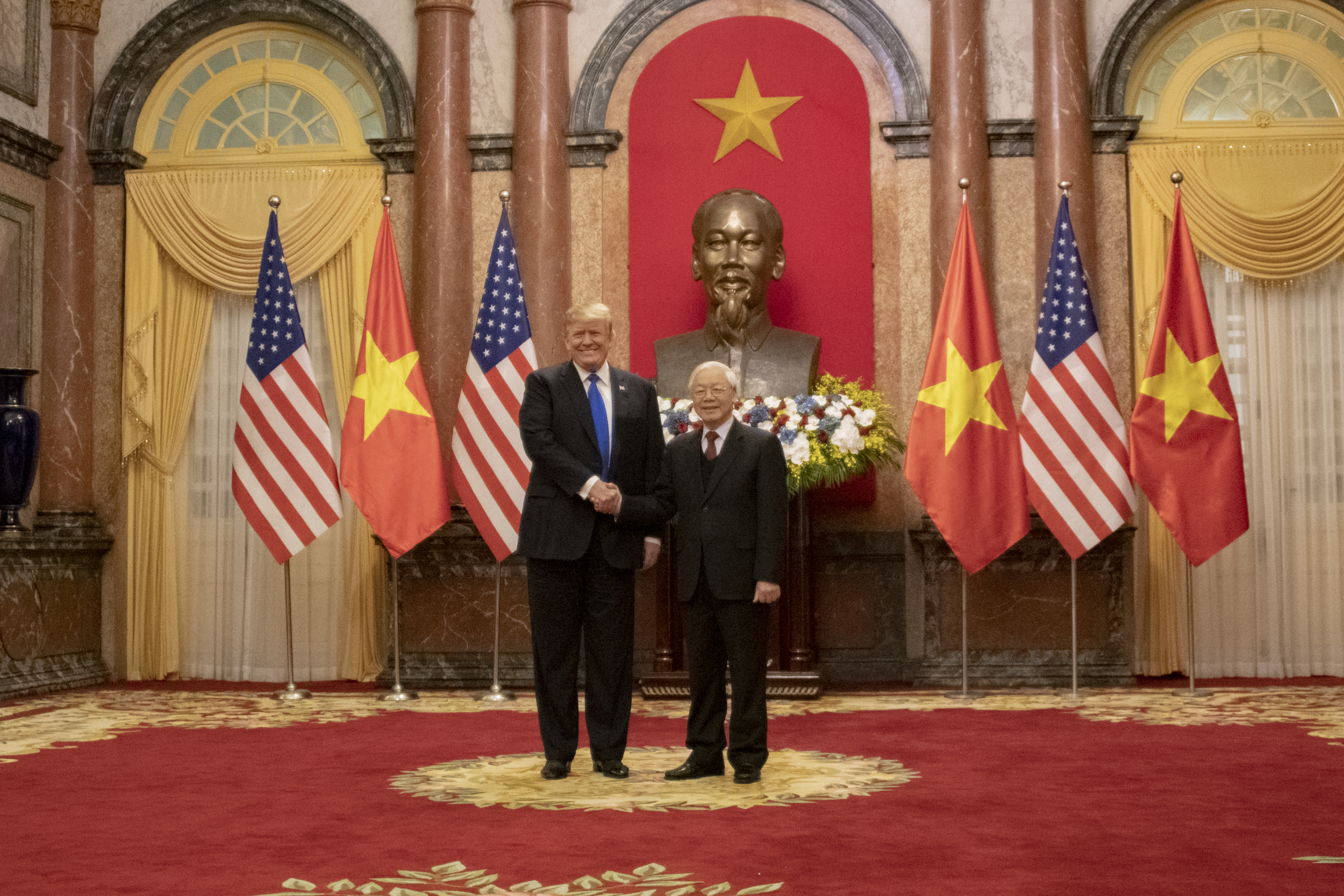
Trọng and US president Donald Trump in front of a statue of Vietnamese revolutionary leader Ho Chi Minh, 27 February 2019

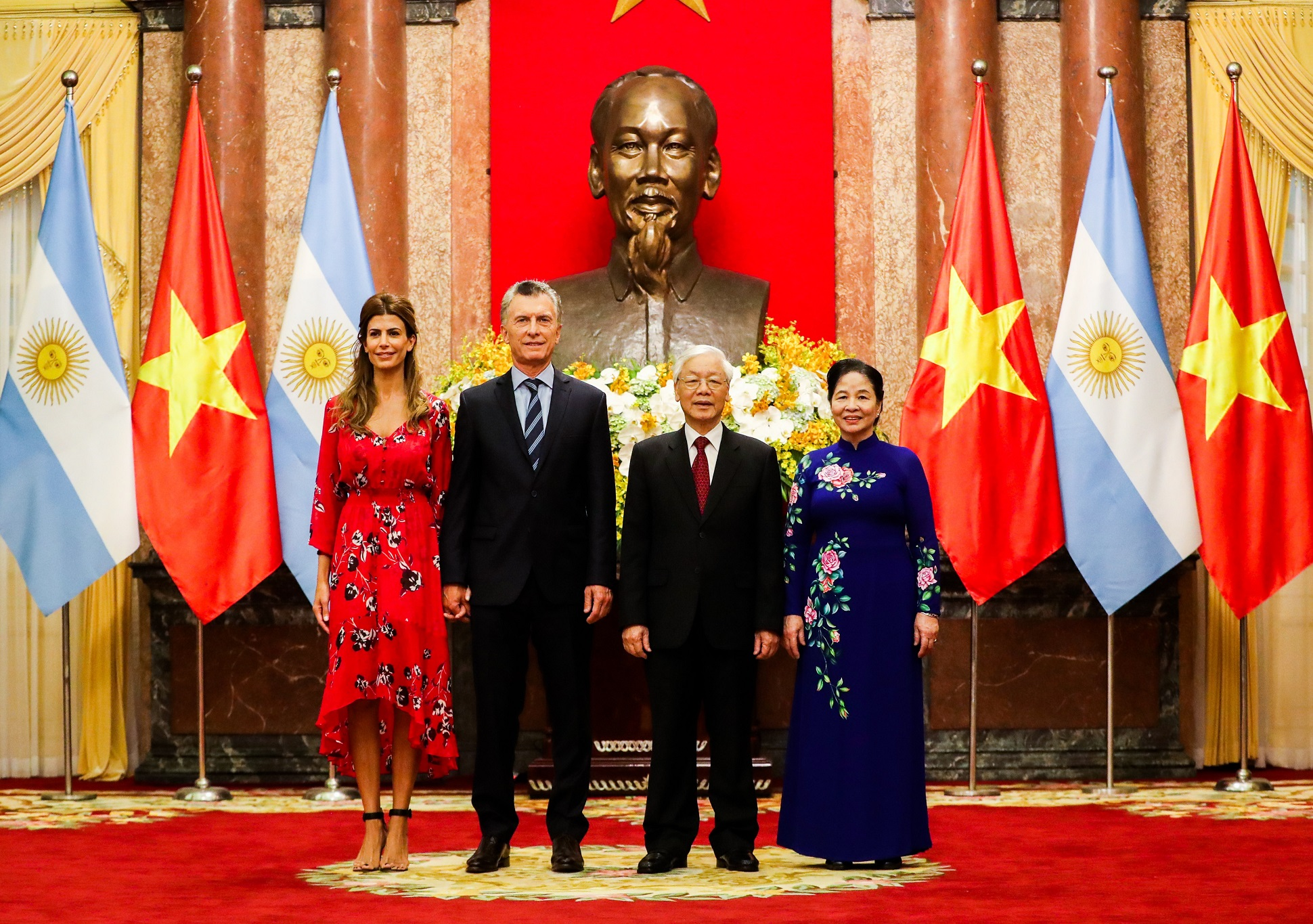
Trọng meeting with Argentine president Mauricio Macri in Hanoi, 2019

Trọng visited China in January 2017, where Beijing and Hanoi signed 15 cooperation documents in various fields and issued a 10-point joint communiqué to deepen Sino-Vietnamese relations. According to state media, the two leaders pledged to continue the "friendly neighbourliness, comprehensive cooperation, long-term stability, towards the future" between China and Vietnam. In November 2017, the General Secretary of the Chinese Communist Party Xi Jinping paid a return visit to Vietnam, where the two sides discussed renewed cooperation on production capacity, energy, cross-border economic cooperation zones, e-commerce, human resources, economy and trade, finance, culture, health, information, social sciences and border defense.

On 3 October 2018, following the death of President Trần Đại Quang, the Central Committee of the CPV formally nominated Trọng for the presidency, which was voted on at a subsequent session of the National Assembly, where the party holds an overwhelming majority. This made Trọng the third person to simultaneously serve as both head of the party and state, after Hồ Chí Minh (in North Vietnam only) and Trường Chinh. The National Assembly elected Trọng as president on 23 October with 99.79% percent of the vote in a meeting of the sixth session of the National Assembly. His swearing-in ceremony took place at the Grand Hall and was broadcast live on the afternoon on state radio and television systems.

In February 2019, Vietnam was chosen to host the 2019 North Korea–United States Hanoi Summit. Trọng met two leaders as a neutral host state leader. Trọng met Donald Trump and Kim Jong Un during the summit.

On 14 April, it was reported that Trọng had been rushed to the Chợ Rẫy Hospital in Ho Chi Minh City after visiting Kiên Giang while celebrating his 75th birthday, according to overseas news sources. He was rumoured to have suffered a stroke. The Vietnamese government initially had no comment on the subject matter, but later confirmed from the Ministry of Foreign Affairs of Vietnam that he was "unwell, but will soon return to work". He reappeared a month later on 14 May to discuss about the upcoming Party Congress.

=== Third term (2021–2024) ===
On 31 January 2021, Trọng was re-elected as General Secretary for a third term by the 1st Plenary Session of the 13th Central Committee, making him the first leader since Lê Duẩn (1969–1986) to serve more than two terms. On 1 February 2021, Trọng attended a press conference. Trọng said:

I am not in great health [...] I am old and I want to rest, but the Congress has elected me so I will comply with my duty to serve as a party member.

Trọng was the first person to be elected as CPV general secretary for a third term since 1986.

The National Assembly on 2 April 2021 voted to relieve Trọng's presidency with 91.25% of the vote. Trọng remained de facto top leader in the country, serving as the General Secretary of the Communist Party. He was succeeded by Nguyễn Xuân Phúc.

When the Russian invasion of Ukraine broke out in February 2022, Vietnam maintained a neutral stance, abstaining from voting at most United Nations voting sessions on resolutions related to the invasion. Between 30 October and 2 November, Trọng visited China and met Chinese Communist Party (CCP) general secretary Xi Jinping, becoming the first foreign leader to meet Xi after he secured a third term in the 20th CCP National Congress. Both leaders released a joint statement, calling for cooperation in economic, political, defense and security areas and working together in "the fight against terrorism, 'peaceful evolution', 'colour revolution' and the politicisation of human rights issues". Xi paid a reciprocal visit a year later in December 2023 to Hanoi. During Xi's 2023 visit, the two leaders agreed to build "a community of shared future for humankind", months after Hanoi upgraded its formal relations with the United States.

In January 2023, Phúc resigned from the presidency due to corruption scandals, leading Trọng's ally Võ Văn Thưởng to succeed him in March. From 21 to 23 May 2023, the deputy chairman of Russia's Security Council, and former president and prime minister, Dmitry Medvedev, visited Vietnam and met with Trọng. They discussed the strengthening of ties between Russia and Vietnam and the current international situation. During a visit to Vietnam on 10 September 2023, U.S. president Joe Biden visited with Trọng, with the Vietnamese government upgrading the relationship between the countries to that of a Comprehensive Strategic Partnership, the highest awarded by Vietnam.

On 19 June 2024, Russian president Vladimir Putin visited Vietnam and met with Trọng. Putin thanked Vietnam for its "balanced position" on Russia's invasion of Ukraine.

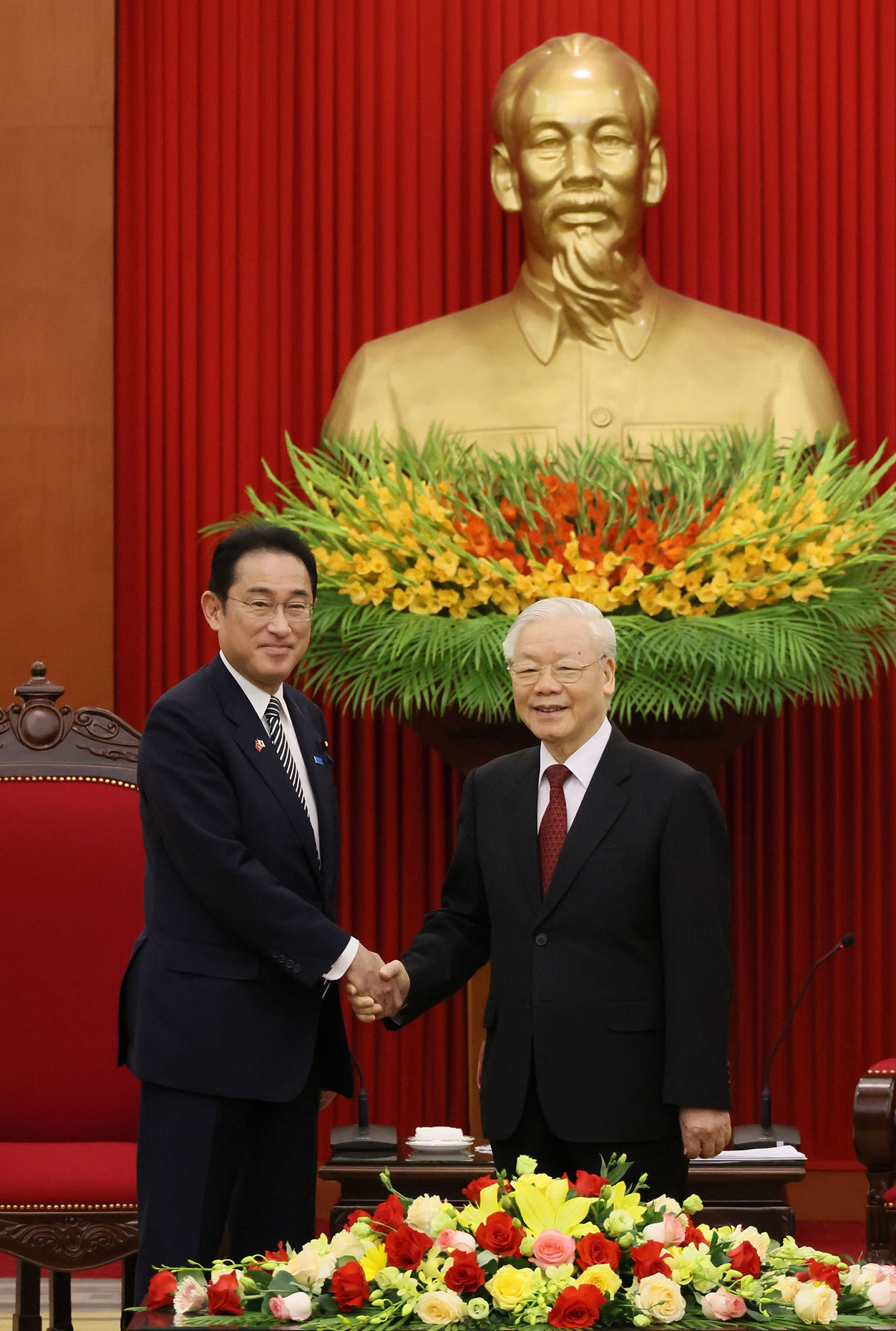
Trọng with Japanese prime minister Fumio Kishida in 2022

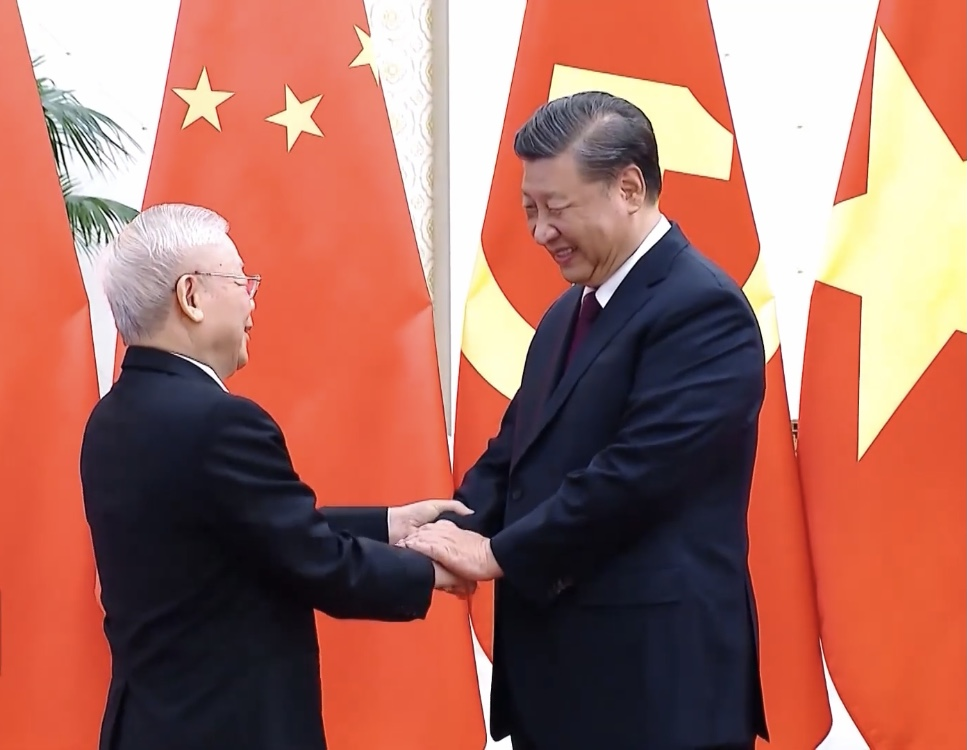
Trọng with CCP general secretary Xi Jinping in October 2022

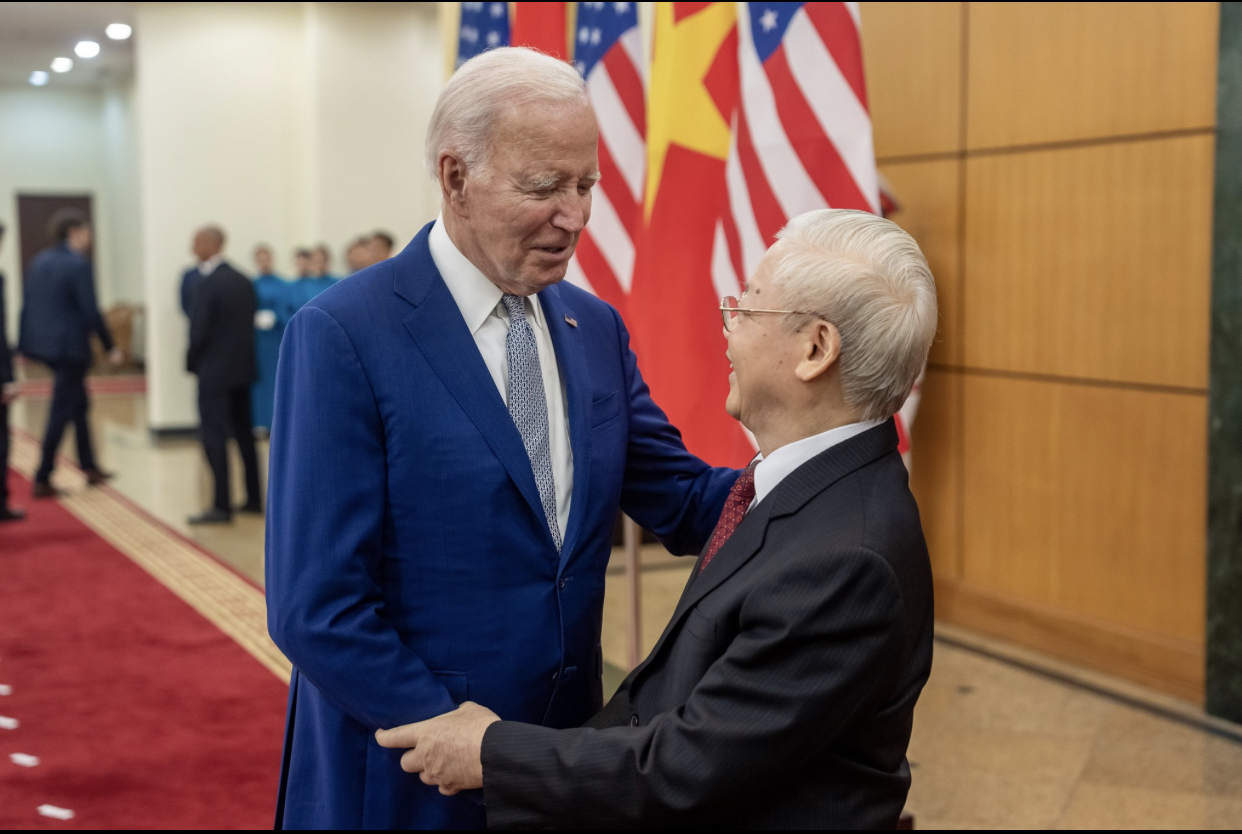
Trọng with U.S. president Joe Biden in September 2023

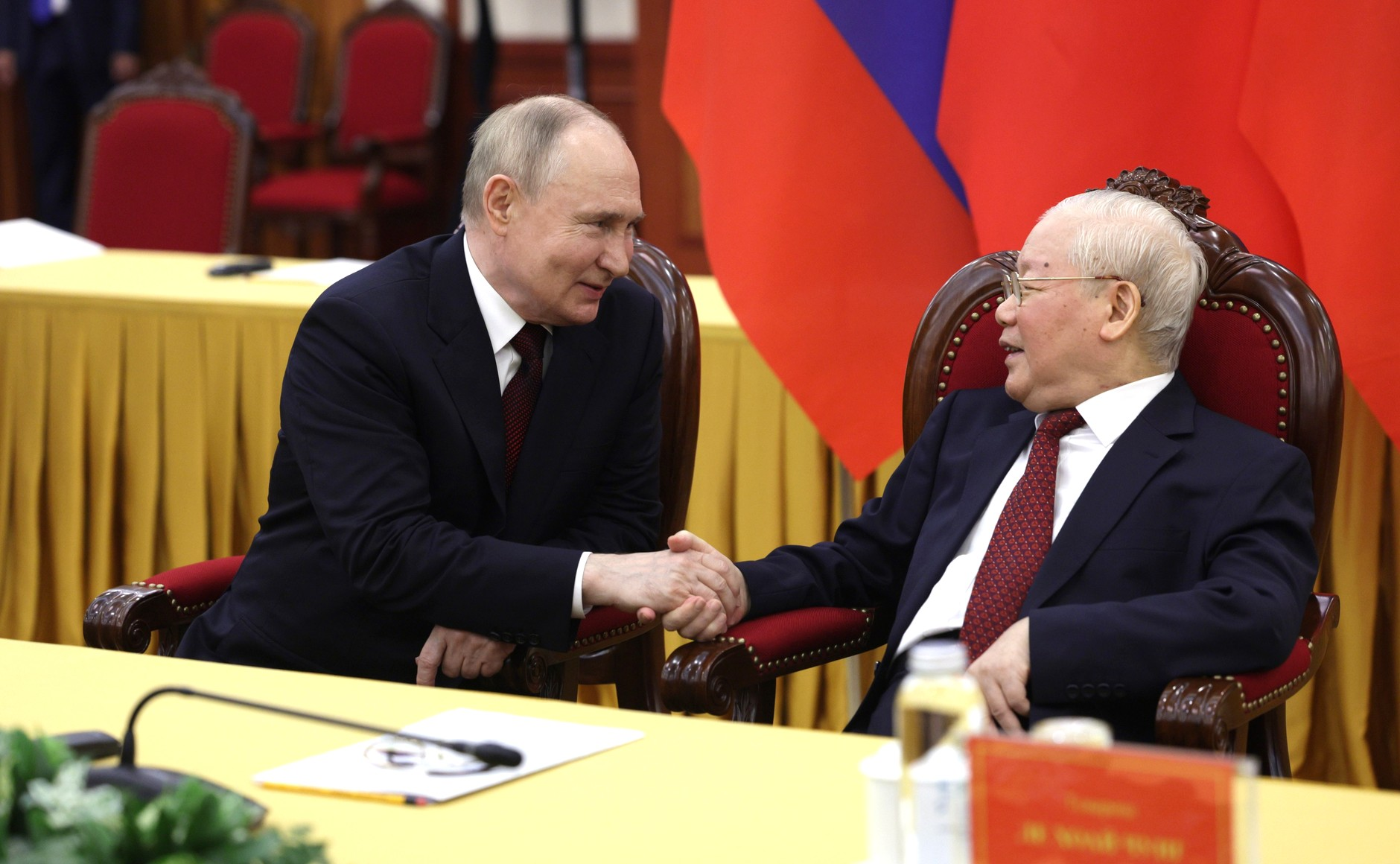
Trọng with Russian president Vladimir Putin in Hanoi, June 2024. It was his last public appearance.

== Political positions ==
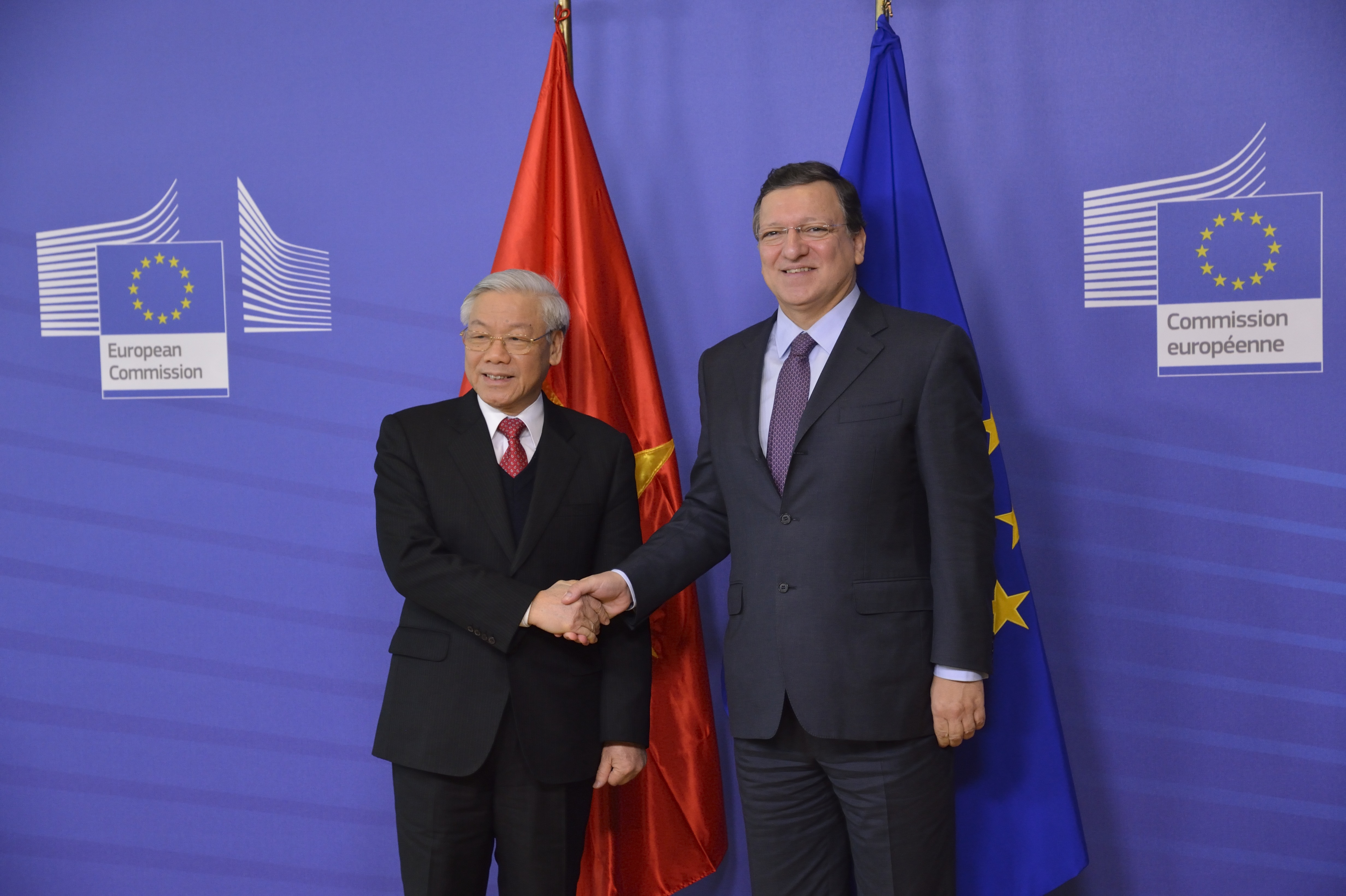
Trọng with President of the European Commission José Manuel Barroso in 2013

Ideologically, Trọng was considered to be from the more traditional Marxist–Leninist faction within the CPV. He long railed against some party members' loss of "Marxist–Leninist virtue". Trọng stated that "a country without discipline would be chaotic and unstable ... . We need to balance democracy and law and order". He criticized Western democracy in a book in 2022, writing that "The reality is that the democratic institutions according to the 'liberal democracy' formula that the West tries to promote and impose on the world do not ensure that power truly belongs to the people, by the people and for the people."

"We need a society in which development is truly for people, not for profit that exploits and tramples on human dignity. We need economic development coupled with progress and social justice, not increasing the gap between rich and poor and social inequality. ... And we need a political system where power truly belongs to the people, by the people and serves the interests of the people, not just a wealthy few." According to Trọng's article in 2022, discussing socialist-oriented democracy.

== Personal life ==
Trọng was married to Ngô Thị Mận. He had a daughter, Nguyễn Thị Kim Ngọc (born in 1973), and a son, Nguyễn Trọng Trường (born in 1976), both of whom work as government employees.

== Death ==
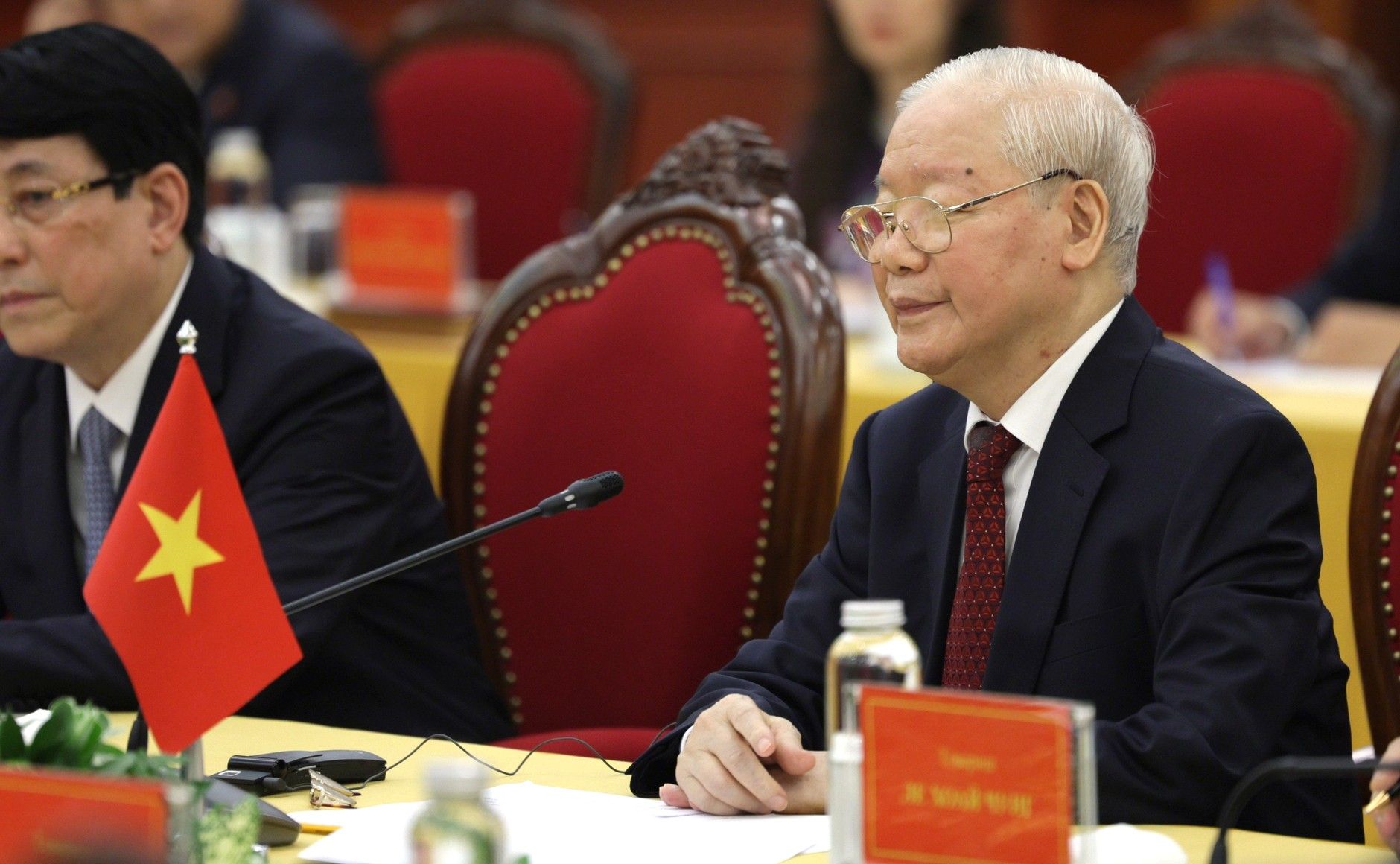
Trọng's last public appearance during Putin's state visit to Vietnam on 20 June 2024.

Posthumous portrait of Trọng

On 18 July 2024, Trọng was replaced on a caretaker basis as General Secretary of the CPV by President Tô Lâm due to ill health. Trọng died at 13:38 (local time) on 19 July 2024 at Central Military Hospital 108 in Hanoi, at the age of 80. State media, citing information from the CPV's Board of Health Protection and Care for Central Officials (Ban Bảo vệ, chăm sóc sức khỏe cán bộ Trung ương), stated that he died "after a period of illness". His death was announced to the public at around 18:00 (UTC+07:00). The Vietnamese and Lao governments declared an official mourning period for 25 and 26 July. Tô Lâm became interim General Secretary upon Trọng's death.

Messages of condolences were sent from 130 countries and 32 organizations, including the leaders of Laos, Cambodia, China, Russia, Belarus, Cuba, Thailand, Malaysia, Singapore, India, North Korea, South Korea, Turkmenistan, the United States, Japan, Australia, France, Germany, Italy, Canada, the United Kingdom and others. Additionally, the United States' ambassador to Vietnam, Marc Knapper, also released a statement of condolences. The Cuban government declared three days of state mourning.

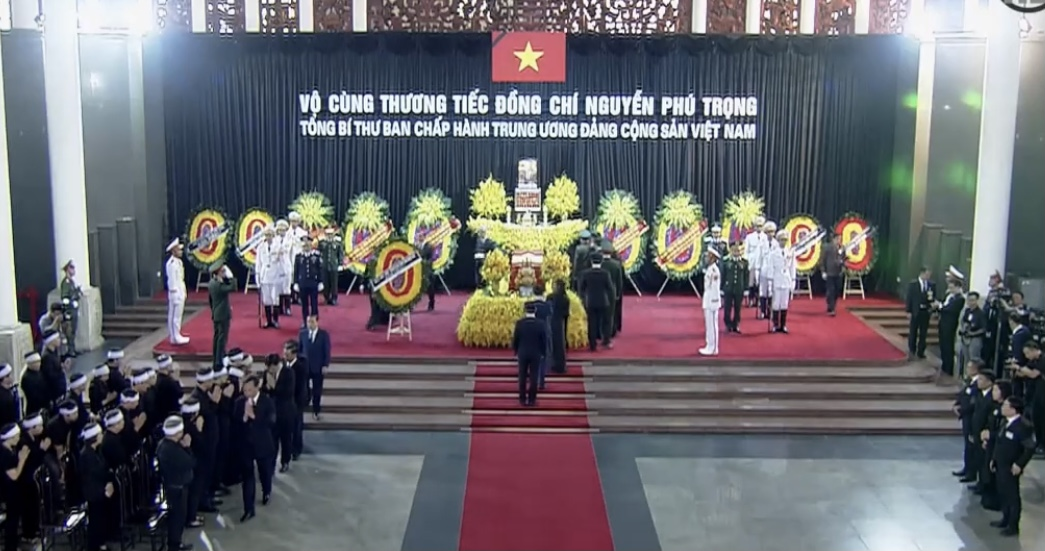
Trọng's remains lie in state in the National Funeral Home. (Taken from Hưng Yên newspaper, radio & television station)

U.N. Secretary-General António Guterres spoke of Trọng as "a pivotal figure in Vietnam's recent history," emphasizing that under his leadership, Vietnam has emerged as one of the world's fastest-growing economies and a vital partner of the United Nations. European Union ambassador to Vietnam Julien Guerrier issued a statement of condolences, stating that Trọng's "commitment and dedication to the nation have left an indelible mark on Vietnam’s history and development" and Trọng "played a pivotal role in strengthening Vietnam’s position on the global stage and fostering meaningful partnerships with the international community."

Several activities to mourn Trọng were organized during the week of 22 and 28 July 2024. A state funeral was held on 25 and 26 July, culminating with Trọng's burial at the Mai Dịch Cemetery on 26 July at 15:00 (local time). Among those who attended were representatives of over 20 countries and organizations, including the General Secretary of the Lao People's Revolutionary Party Thongloun Sisoulith, South Korean Prime Minister Han Duck-soo, former Japanese Prime Minister Yoshihide Suga and European Commission Vice President Josep Borrell. Other senior officials from China, Cuba, India, Indonesia, Thailand, Russia and many others were presented as well. In addition, the US Secretary of State Antony Blinken also went to Vietnam to visit and condole with Trọng's family on 27 July 2024.

== Legacy ==
In an article for The Washington Post, journalist Rebecca Tan called Trọng's leadership of Vietnam a period of strong transformation which opened Vietnam's economy and attracted investment and economic cooperation with many countries while at the same time, tightened the Communist Party of Vietnam's leadership over society, including pressuring technology companies like Meta to restrict freedom of expression in social media platforms. Due to the increase in stifling of press freedom in Vietnam under his tenure, Reporters Without Borders included Trọng among the list of press freedom predators since 2011.

== Honours ==
=== State honours ===
Vietnam

- Gold Star Order (2024; posthumous)
- 55-year Party membership badge (2023)
- 50-year Party membership badge (2018)
- Resistance War Medal First Class

Foreign

- China: Friendship Medal (31 October 2022)
- Cuba: Order of José Martí (9 April 2012)
- Laos: National Gold Medal (5 September 2007)

=== Other honours ===
- Communist Party of the Russian Federation: Lenin Prize (15 December 2021)

== Published works ==
=== Books ===
- Nguyen Phu Trọng; Tran Dinh Nghiem; Vu Hien (1995). Vietnam from 1986 (Việt Nam từ năm 1986). Hanoi: Thế giới Publishers. 116 p.
- Nguyen Phu Trọng (2004). Viet Nam on The Path of Renewal (Việt Nam Trọng Tiến Trình Đổi Mới). Hanoi: Thế giới Publishers. 351 p.
- Nguyen Phu Trọng (2015). Renewal in Việt Nam: Theory and Reality (Đổi Mới ở Việt Nam: Lý thuyết và thực tiễn). Hanoi: Thế giới Publishers. 397 p.
- Nguyen Phu Trọng (2019) Determined to prevent and fight corruption (Quyết tâm ngăn chặn và đẩy lùi tham nhũng), Hanoi: Truth National Political Publisher, 380 p.
- Nguyen Phu Trọng (2021) Bringing the country into a new phase in a united and confident manner (Đoàn kết, vững tin đưa đất nước bước vào giai đoạn mới), Hanoi: Truth National Political Publisher, 752 p.
- Nguyen Phu Trọng (2021) The whole Party and people join hands and unite to build our country more and more prosperous and happy (Toàn Đảng, toàn dân chung sức, đồng lòng xây dựng đất nước ta ngày càng phồn vinh, hạnh phúc). Hanoi: Truth National Political Publisher (2021), 608 p.
- Nguyen Phu Trọng (2023) Resolutely and persistently fight against corruption and negativity, contributing to building an increasingly clean and strong Party and State (Kiên quyết, kiên trì đấu tranh phòng, chống tham nhũng, tiêu cực, góp phần xây dựng Đảng và Nhà nước ta ngày càng Trọng sạch, vững mạnh. Hanoi: Truth National Political Publisher, 600 p.

== See also ==
- History of Vietnam
- Politics of Vietnam

Party political offices
| Preceded by Nong Duc Manh | General Secretary of the Communist Party of Vietnam; 2011–2024 | Succeeded by Tô Lâm |
| Preceded by Nong Duc Manh | Secretary of the Central Military Commission of the Communist Party of Vietnam; 2011–2024 | Succeeded by Tô Lâm |
Political offices
| Preceded by Nguyễn Văn An | Chairman of the National Assembly of Vietnam; 2006–2011 | Succeeded by Nguyễn Sinh Hùng |
| Preceded by Trần Đại Quang; Đặng Thị Ngọc Thịnh; Acting | President of Vietnam; 2018–2021 | Succeeded by Nguyễn Xuân Phúc |
