= Press freedom predator =

Anti-award attributed to those having a negative effect on press freedom

Press freedom predator is an anti-award distributed every few years by Reporters Without Borders. It is attributed to heads of state or groups who are deemed to have a negative effect on press freedom.

Recipients often vehemently deny that they deserve their place on the list. In 2020, Reporters Without Borders also released a list of 20 press freedom's digital predators.

== 2025 ==
In November 2025, the list of press freedom predators published by Reporters Without Borders includes:

Image	Name	Country	Role
	Adani Group	India	Multinational conglomerate
	Alden Global Capital	United States	Hedge fund / media owner
	Aleksandar Vučić	Serbia	President of Serbia (2017–2026)
	Alexander Lukashenko	Belarus	President of Belarus (1994–present)
	Ali Khamenei	Iran	Supreme Leader of Iran (1989–2026)
	Alphabet Inc.	United States	Technology company
	Bidzina Ivanishvili	Georgia; France	Businessman, Prime Minister of Georgia (2012-2013)
	Brendan Carr	United States	Chair of the Federal Communications Commission (2025–present)
	Chinese Communist Party	China	Ruling political party
	Daniel Ortega	Nicaragua	President of Nicaragua (2007–present)
	Elon Musk	United States	Businessman, CEO of X/Tesla/SpaceX
	Foundation Against Terrorism	Guatemala	Political/legal organization
Official calligraphy	Haibatullah Akhundzada	Afghanistan	Supreme Leader of Afghanistan (2021–present)
	HonestReporting	Israel	Media watchdog organization
	Ilham Aliyev	Azerbaijan	President of Azerbaijan (2003–present)
	Israel Defense Forces	Israel	Military of Israel
	Jalisco New Generation Cartel	Mexico	Criminal organization
	Javier Milei	Argentina	President of Argentina (2023–present)
	John Lee Ka-chiu	Hong Kong (China)	Chief Executive of Hong Kong (2022–present)
	Margarita Simonyan	Russia	Editor-in-chief of Russia Today
	Meta Platforms	United States	Technology company
	Mohammed bin Salman	Saudi Arabia	Crown Prince of Saudi Arabia (2017-present)
	Nicolás Maduro	Venezuela	President of Venezuela (2013–2026)
	OpIndia	India	Far-right news and media website
	Patriotic Movement for Safeguard and Restoration	Burkina Faso	Ruling military government (2022-present)
	Recep Tayyip Erdoğan	Turkey	President of Turkey (2014–present)
	Robert Fico	Slovakia	Prime Minister of Slovakia (2006–2010, 2012–2018, 2023–present)
	Roskomnadzor	Russia	Federal media regulator
	Seng Heang	Cambodia	Prosecutor / government official
SSPC Chairman; Min Aung Hlaing pictured in report	State Security and Peace Commission (SSPC) (Note: Chairman Min Aung Hlaing is pictured in the RWB report, and was identified by RWB as the key decision-maker on the SSPC, though the RWB named the SSPC itself as the press freedom predator.)	Myanmar	Advisory election coordination body (2025–2026) to Min Aung Hlaing, Myanmar's military ruler from 2021 Min Aung Hlaing was the country's sole military ruler starting in 2021. RWB and some analysts such as the Stimson Center considered the SSPC to be the principal organ of Min Aung Hlaing's control from 2025–2026, though he was the sole decision-maker from 2021 regardless of cosmetic structural changes. During the SSPC period, he governed as the acting president of Myanmar by chairing the National Defence and Security Council, through which he took all binding government actions, including the formation of the SSPC itself. Min Aung Hlaing was named personally as the predator in § 2021, and, although RWB chose to name the SSPC, one of his administrative bodies, as the predator in 2025 instead, Min Aung Hlaing's personal control over the government strengthened greatly in the years following his designation in 2021. His State Administration Council from 2021–2025 had nominal governing powers, despite being under his full control; the SSPC lacked even nominal governing power and its labeled purpose was "coordination" of the 2025–26 Myanmar general election, with laws continuing to be passed through the NDSC.
	Vincent Bolloré	France	Businessman, media owner
	Viktor Orbán	Hungary	Prime Minister of Hungary (2010–2026)
	Vladimir Putin	Russia	President of Russia (2012–present); Prime Minister of Russia (2008–2012)
	Vladimir Tabak	Russia	Government communications official and ally of Vladimir Putin
	William Ruto	Kenya	President of Kenya (2022–present)

== 2021 ==
In July 2021, the list of press freedom predators published by Reporters Without Borders includes:

Image	Name	Country	Role
	Abdel Fattah el-Sisi	Egypt	President of Egypt (2014–present)
	Alexander Lukashenko	Belarus	President of Belarus (1994–present)
	Ali Khamenei	Iran	Supreme Leader of Iran (1989–2026)
	Bashar al-Assad	Syria	President of Syria (2000–2024)
	Carrie Lam	Hong Kong (China)	Chief Executive of Hong Kong (2017–2022)
	Daniel Ortega	Nicaragua	President of Nicaragua (1979–1990 and 2007–present)
	Emomali Rahmon	Tajikistan	President of Tajikistan (1994–present)
	Gotabaya Rajapaksa	Sri Lanka	President of Sri Lanka (2019–2022); Secretary to the Ministry of Defence (2005–2015)
	Gurbanguly Berdimuhammedov	Turkmenistan	President of Turkmenistan (2007–2022); Chairman of the People's Council of Turkmenistan (2021–present)
	Hamad bin Isa Al Khalifa	Bahrain	King of Bahrain (2002–present)
	Hun Sen	Cambodia	Prime Minister of Cambodia (1998–2023); President of the Senate (2024–present)
	Ilham Aliyev	Azerbaijan	President of Azerbaijan (2003–present)
	Imran Khan	Pakistan	Prime Minister of Pakistan (2018–2022)
	Isaias Afwerki	Eritrea	President of Eritrea (1993–present)
	Ismaïl Omar Guelleh	Djibouti	President of Djibouti (1999–present)
	Jair Bolsonaro	Brazil	President of Brazil (2019–2022)
	Kim Jong-un	North Korea	Supreme Leader of North Korea (2011–present); General Secretary of the Workers' Party of Korea (2012–present)
	Lee Hsien Loong	Singapore	Prime Minister of Singapore (2004–2024); Senior Minister of Singapore (2024-present)
	Miguel Díaz-Canel	Cuba	First Secretary of the Communist Party of Cuba (2021–present); President of Cuba (2019–present)
	Min Aung Hlaing	Myanmar	Chairman of the State Administration Council (2021–2025) was the key role in the 2021 report Commander-in-Chief of Defence Services (2011–2026) role led report to label him retroactively from 2011
	Mohammed bin Salman	Saudi Arabia	Crown Prince of Saudi Arabia (2017–present); Minister of Defense (2015–present)
	Narendra Modi	India	Prime Minister of India (2014–present)
	Nguyễn Phú Trọng	Vietnam	General Secretary of the Communist Party of Vietnam (2011–2024); President of Vietnam (2018–2021)
	Nicolás Maduro	Venezuela	President of Venezuela (2013–present)
	Paul Biya	Cameroon	President of Cameroon (1982–present)
	Paul Kagame	Rwanda	President of Rwanda (2000–present)
	Prayut Chan-o-cha	Thailand	Prime Minister of Thailand (2014–2023); Minister of Defence (2019–2023)
	Ramzan Kadyrov	Chechnya (Russia)	Head of the Chechen Republic (2007–present)
	Recep Tayyip Erdoğan	Turkey	President of Turkey (2014–present); Prime Minister of Turkey (2003–2014)
	Rodrigo Duterte	Philippines	President of the Philippines (2016–2020)
	Salva Kiir	South Sudan	President of South Sudan (2011–present)
	Sheikh Hasina	Bangladesh	Prime Minister of Bangladesh (1996–2001 and 2009–2024)
	Teodoro Obiang Nguema Mbasogo	Equatorial Guinea	President of Equatorial Guinea (1979–present)
	Viktor Orbán	Hungary	Prime Minister of Hungary (1998–2002 and 2010–present)
	Vladimir Putin	Russia	President of Russia (2000–2008 and 2012–present); Prime Minister of Russia (2008–2012)
	Xi Jinping	China	General Secretary of the Chinese Communist Party (2012–present); President of China (2013–present)
	Yoweri Museveni	Uganda	President of Uganda (1986–present)

== 2016 ==
In October 2016, the list of press freedom predators published by Reporters Without Borders includes:

Image	Name	Country	Role
	Abdel Fattah el-Sisi	Egypt	President of Egypt (2014–present)
	Al-Shabaab	Somalia	Islamic insurgence group active in East Africa
	Alexander Lukashenko	Belarus	President of Belarus (1994–present)
	Ali Khamenei	Iran	Supreme Leader of Iran (1989–2026)
	Ansar Allah	Yemen	An Islamist political and armed movement in Yemen
	Ansarullah Bangla Team	Bangladesh	An Islamic Jihadi organization in Bangladesh
	Bashar al-Assad	Syria	President of Syria (2000–2024)
	Gurbanguly Berdimuhammedov	Turkmenistan	President of Turkmenistan (2007–2022)
	Hamad bin Isa Al Khalifa	Bahrain	King of Bahrain (2002–present)
	Ilham Aliyev	Azerbaijan	President of Azerbaijan (2003–present)
	Isaias Afwerki	Eritrea	President of Eritrea (1993–present)
	Islamic State	Iraq; Syria; Afghanistan; Libya	Militant Islamist group and former unrecognized quasi-state
	Joseph Kabila	Democratic Republic of the Congo	President of the Democratic Republic of the Congo (2001–2019)
	Kim Jong-un	North Korea	Supreme Leader of North Korea (2011–present); General Secretary of the Workers' Party of Korea (2012–present)
	Lee Hsien Loong	Singapore	Prime Minister of Singapore (2004–present)
	Los Zetas	Mexico	Mexican criminal syndicate
	Nguyễn Phú Trọng	Vietnam	General Secretary of the Communist Party of Vietnam (2011–2024); President of Vietnam (2018–2021)
	Nicolás Maduro	Venezuela	President of Venezuela (2013–present)
	Nursultan Nazarbayev	Kazakhstan	President of Kazakhstan (1991–2019)
	Omar al-Bashir	Sudan	President of Sudan (1993–2019)
	Inter-Services Intelligence	Pakistan	Pakistan's intelligence agency
	Paul Kagame	Rwanda	President of Rwanda (2000–present)
	Pierre Nkurunziza	Burundi	President of Burundi (2005–2020)
	Prayut Chan-o-cha	Thailand	Prime Minister of Thailand (2014–2023); Minister of Defence (2019–2023)
	Ramzan Kadyrov	Chechnya (Russia)	Head of the Chechen Republic (2007–present)
	Raúl Castro	Cuba	First Secretary of the Communist Party of Cuba (2011–2021); President of the Council of State (2008–2018)
	Recep Tayyip Erdoğan	Turkey	President of Turkey (2014–present); Prime Minister of Turkey (2003–2014)
	Robert Mugabe	Zimbabwe	President of Zimbabwe (1987–2017)
	Salman bin Abdulaziz Al Saud	Saudi Arabia	King of Saudi Arabia (2015–present); Crown Prince of Saudi Arabia (2012–2015); Minister of Defence (2011–2015)
	Salva Kiir	South Sudan	President of South Sudan (2011–present)
	Taliban	Afghanistan	Islamic fundamentalist, militant Islamist, and jihadist political movement in Afghanistan
	Teodoro Obiang Nguema Mbasogo	Equatorial Guinea	President of Equatorial Guinea (1979–present)
	Vladimir Putin	Russia	President of Russia (2000–2008 and 2012–present); Prime Minister of Russia (2008–2012)
	Xi Jinping	China	General Secretary of the Chinese Communist Party (2012–present); President of China (2013–present)
	Yahya Jammeh	The Gambia	President of the Gambia (1996–2017)

== 2013 ==
In May 2013, the list of press freedom predators published by Reporters Without Borders includes:

=== Africa ===
Image	Name	Country	Role
	Al-Shabaab	Somalia	Islamic insurgence group active in East Africa
	Boko Haram	Nigeria	An Islamic terrorist organization based in northeastern Nigeria
	Hizbul Islam	Somalia	Somali Islamist group
	Isaias Afwerki	Eritrea	President of Eritrea (1993–present)
	Mswati III	Eswatini	King of Eswatini (1986–present)
	Paul Kagame	Rwanda	President of Rwanda (2000–present)
	Robert Mugabe	Zimbabwe	President of Zimbabwe (1987–2017)
	Teodoro Obiang Nguema Mbasogo	Equatorial Guinea	President of Equatorial Guinea (1979–present)
	Yahya Jammeh	The Gambia	President of the Gambia (1996–2017)

=== Americas ===
Image	Name	Country	Role
	Dario Antonio Úsuga	Colombia	Leader of the drug trafficking group Clan del Golfo
	Los Zetas	Mexico	Mexican criminal syndicate
	Miguel Facussé Barjum	Honduras	Honduran businessman and landowner
	Miguel Treviño Morales	Mexico	Mexican drug lord
	Raúl Castro	Cuba	First Secretary of the Communist Party of Cuba (2011–2021); President of the Council of State (2008–2018)

=== Asia ===
Image	Name	Country	Role
	Abdullah bin Abdulaziz Al Saud	Saudi Arabia	King of Saudi Arabia (2005–2015); Prime Minister of Saudi Arabia (2005–2015)
	Ahmed al-Sharaa	Syria	Commander-in-chief of Tahrir al-Sham (2017–present); Emir of the Al-Nusra Front (2012–2017)
	Ali Khamenei	Iran	Supreme Leader of Iran (1989–2026)
	Balochistan Liberation Army	Pakistan	A militant group waging a violent armed struggle against Pakistan for what it claims as self-determination for the Baloch people and separation of Balochistan from Pakistan.
	Bashar al-Assad	Syria	President of Syria (2000–2024)
	Choummaly Sayasone	Laos	General Secretary of the Lao People's Revolutionary Party (2006–2016); President of Laos (2006–2016)
	Gotabaya Rajapaksa	Sri Lanka	President of Sri Lanka (2019–2022); Secretary to the Ministry of Defence (2005–2015)
	Gurbanguly Berdimuhammedov	Turkmenistan	President of Turkmenistan (2007–2022)
	Hamad bin Isa Al Khalifa	Bahrain	King of Bahrain (2002–present)
	Ilham Aliyev	Azerbaijan	President of Azerbaijan (2003–present)
	Inter-Services Intelligence	Pakistan	Pakistan's intelligence agency
	Islam Karimov	Uzbekistan	President of Uzbekistan (1991–2016)
	Israel Defence Forces	Israel	Military forces of the State of Israel
	Kim Jong-un	North Korea	Supreme Leader of North Korea (2011–present); General Secretary of the Workers' Party of Korea (2012–present)
	Leaders and members of extremist religious groups	Maldives	
	Mahinda Rajapaksa	Sri Lanka	President of Sri Lanka (2005–2015); Prime Minister of Sri Lanka (2004–2005, 2018 and 2019–2022)
	Mahmoud Ahmadinejad	Iran	President of Iran (2005–2013)
	Mullah Omar	Afghanistan	Founder and Supreme Leader of the Taliban (1994–2013); Designated in § 2001 as Supreme Leader of Afghanistan (1996–2001)
	Muslim Brotherhood	Egypt	A transnational Sunni Islamist organization
	Nguyễn Phú Trọng	Vietnam	General Secretary of the Communist Party of Vietnam (2011–2024); President of Vietnam (2018–2021)
	Nursultan Nazarbayev	Kazakhstan	President of Kazakhstan (1991–2019)
	Private militias	Philippines	
	Vasif Talibov	Nakhchivan Autonomous Republic (Azerbaijan)	Chairman of the Supreme Assembly of the Nakhchivan Autonomous Republic (1993–present)
	Xi Jinping	China	General Secretary of the Chinese Communist Party (2012–present); President of China (2013–present)

=== Europe ===
Image	Name	Country	Role
	Alexander Lukashenko	Belarus	President of Belarus (1994–present)
	Camorra	Italy	Italian Mafia-type criminal organization and criminal society originating in the region of Campania, and is one of the oldest and largest criminal organizations in Italy.
	Ramzan Kadyrov	Chechnya (Russia)	Head of the Chechen Republic (2007–present)
	Vladimir Putin	Russia	President of Russia (2000–2008 and 2012–present); Prime Minister of Russia (2008–2012)

== 2009–2011 ==
The list of press freedom predators published by Reporters Without Borders from 2009 to 2011 includes:

Image	Name	Country	Role
	Abdullah bin Abdulaziz Al Saud	Saudi Arabia	King of Saudi Arabia (2005–2015); Prime Minister of Saudi Arabia (2005–2015)
	Abdulkadir Hussein Mohamed	Somalia	Minister of Information, Posts and Telecommunications of Somalia
	Alexander Lukashenko	Belarus	President of Belarus (1994–present)
	Al-Shabaab	Somalia	Islamic insurgence group active in East Africa
	Ali Abdullah Saleh	Yemen	President of Yemen (1990–2012)
	Ali Khamenei	Iran	Supreme Leader of Iran (1989–2026)
	Bashar al-Assad	Syria	President of Syria (2000–2024)
	Black Eagles	Colombia	Colombian paramilitary forces
	Choummaly Sayasone	Laos	General Secretary of the Lao People's Revolutionary Party (2006–2016); President of Laos (2006–2016)
	Euskadi Ta Askatasuna	Spain	An armed Basque nationalist and separatist terrorist organization
	Gotabaya Rajapaksa	Sri Lanka	President of Sri Lanka (2019–2022); Secretary to the Ministry of Defence (2005–2015)
	Gulf Cartel	Mexico	Mexican drug cartel
	Gurbanguly Berdimuhammedov	Turkmenistan	President of Turkmenistan (2007–2022)
	Hamad bin Isa Al Khalifa	Bahrain	King of Bahrain (2002–present)
	Hamas	Palestine	A Palestinian Sunni-Islamic fundamentalist, militant and nationalist organization
	Hizbul Islam	Somalia	Somali Islamist group
	Hu Jintao	China	General Secretary of the Chinese Communist Party (2002–2012); President of China (2003–2013)
	Ilham Aliyev	Azerbaijan	President of Azerbaijan (2003–present)
	Isaias Afwerki	Eritrea	President of Eritrea (1993–present)
	Islam Karimov	Uzbekistan	President of Uzbekistan (1991–2016)
	Israel Defence Forces	Israel	Military forces of the State of Israel
	Janatantrik Terai Mukti Morcha	Nepal	A political organisation in Nepal
	Juárez Cartel	Mexico	Mexican drug cartel
	Kim Jong-il	North Korea	Supreme Leader of North Korea (1994–2011); General Secretary of the Workers' Party of Korea (1997–2011)
	Madhesh Mukti Tigers	Nepal	An armed group in Nepal
	Mahinda Rajapaksa	Sri Lanka	President of Sri Lanka (2005–2015); Prime Minister of Sri Lanka (2004–2005, 2018 and 2019–2022)
	Mahmoud Ahmadinejad	Iran	President of Iran (2005–2013)
	Mswati III	Eswatini	King of Eswatini (1986–present)
	Mullah Omar	Afghanistan	Founder and Supreme Leader of the Taliban (1994–2013); Designated in § 2001 as Supreme Leader of Afghanistan (1996–2001)
	Muammar Gaddafi	Libya	Brotherly Leader and Guide of the Revolution of Libya (1979–2011); Chairperson of the African Union (2009–2010)
	Nông Đức Mạnh	Vietnam	General Secretary of the Communist Party of Vietnam (2001–2011)
	Nursultan Nazarbayev	Kazakhstan	President of Kazakhstan (1991–2019)
	Ogbonna Okechukwu Onovo	Nigeria	Inspector General of the Nigerian Police (2009–2010)
	Organized crime	Italy	
	Palestinian Security Services	Palestine	Armed forces and intelligence agencies of the State of Palestine
	Paul Kagame	Rwanda	President of Rwanda (2000–present)
	Private militias	Philippines	
	Ramzan Kadyrov	Chechnya (Russia)	Head of the Chechen Republic (2007–present)
	Raúl Castro	Cuba	First Secretary of the Communist Party of Cuba (2011–2021); President of the Council of State (2008–2018)
	Revolutionary Armed Forces of Colombia	Colombia	Colombian Marxist–Leninist guerrilla group
	Robert Mugabe	Zimbabwe	President of Zimbabwe (1987–2017)
	Sinaloa Cartel	Mexico	Mexican drug cartel
	Tarek Kamel	Egypt	Minister of Communications and Information Technology of Egypt (2004–2011)
	Teodoro Obiang Nguema Mbasogo	Equatorial Guinea	President of Equatorial Guinea (1979–present)
	Than Shwe	Myanmar	Chairman of the State Peace and Development Council (1992–2011); Commander-in-Chief of the Armed Forces of Myanmar (1992–2011); Prime Minister of Myanmar (1992–2003)
	Tijuana Cartel	Mexico	Mexican drug cartel
	Velupillai Prabhakaran	Sri Lanka	Leader of the Liberation Tigers of Tamil Eelam (1976–2009)
	Vladimir Putin	Russia	President of Russia (2000–2008 and 2012–present); Prime Minister of Russia (2008–2012)
	Yahya Jammeh	The Gambia	President of the Gambia (1996–2017)
	Zine El Abidine Ben Ali	Tunisia	President of Tunisia (1987–2011)

== 2002 ==
In August 2002, the Reporters Without Borders updated the 2001 list of press freedom predators with the inclusion of five more:

Image	Name	Country	Role
	Ariel Sharon	Israel	Prime Minister of Israel (2001–2006)
	Altaf Hossain Choudhury	Bangladesh	Minister of Home Affairs of Bangladesh (2001–2004)
	Islamic militants	Pakistan	
	Armed Forces of the Philippines (in Southern Philippines)	Philippines	Military of the Philippines
	Sher Bahadur Deuba	Nepal	Prime Minister of Nepal (1995–1997, 2001–2002, 2004–2005, 2017–2018 and 2021–2022)

== 2001 ==
In November 2001, the list of press freedom predators published by Reporters Without Borders includes:

Image	Name	Country	Role
	Ali Khamenei	Iran	Supreme Leader of Iran (1989–2026)
	Alexander Lukashenko	Belarus	President of Belarus (1994–present)
	Bashar al-Assad	Syria	President of Syria (2000–2024)
	Carlos Castaño Gil	Colombia	Colombian paramilitary leader and founder of the Peasant Self-Defenders of Córdoba and Urabá
	Euskadi Ta Askatasuna	Spain	An armed Basque nationalist and separatist terrorist organization
	Fahd bin Abdulaziz Al Saud	Saudi Arabia	King of Saudi Arabia (1982–2005); Prime Minister of Saudi Arabia (1982–2005)
	Fidel Castro	Cuba	First Secretary of the Central Committee of the Communist Party of Cuba (1965–2011); President of the Council of State of Cuba (1976–2008); President of the Council of Ministers of Cuba (1976–2008); Prime Minister of Cuba (1959–1976); Secretary-General of the Non-Aligned Movement (1979–1983 and 2006–2008)
	François Compaoré	Burkina Faso	Economic Advisor to the President of Burkina Faso (1989–2014)
	Gnassingbé Eyadéma	Togo	President of Togo (1967–2005)
	Hüseyin Kıvrıkoğlu	Turkey	Chief of the General Staff of Turkey (1998–2002)
	Isaias Afwerki	Eritrea	President of Eritrea (1993–present)
	Islam Karimov	Uzbekistan	President of Uzbekistan (1991–2016)
	Jiang Zemin	China	General Secretary of the Chinese Communist Party (1989–2002); President of China (1993–2003)
	Joseph Kabila	Democratic Republic of the Congo	President of the Democratic Republic of the Congo (2001–2019)
	José Eduardo dos Santos	Angola	President of Angola (1979–2017)
	Joynal Hazari	Bangladesh	Bangladeshi politician and member of Jatiya Sangsad, representing the Feni–2 constituency (1986–1987, 1991–1996 and 1996–2001)
	Khamtai Siphandone	Laos	General Secretary of the Lao People's Revolutionary Party (1992–2006); President of Laos (1998–2006)
	Kidnapping mafia	Chechnya (Russia)	
	Kim Jong-il	North Korea	Supreme Leader of North Korea (1994–2011); General Secretary of the Workers' Party of Korea (1997–2011)
	Kirsan Ilyumzhinov	Kalmykia (Russia)	President of Kalmykia (1993–2010)
	Leonid Kuchma	Ukraine	President of Ukraine (1994–2005)
	Mahathir Mohamad	Malaysia	Prime Minister of Malaysia (1981–2003) and (2018-2020)
	Manuel Marulanda	Colombia	Leader of Revolutionary Armed Forces of Colombia
	Meles Zenawi	Ethiopia	Prime Minister of Ethiopia (1995–2012)
	Mswati III	Eswatini	King of Eswatini (1986–present)
	Muammar Gaddafi	Libya	Brotherly Leader and Guide of the Revolution of Libya (1979–2011); Chairperson of the African Union (2009–2010)
	Mullah Omar	Afghanistan	Supreme Leader of Afghanistan (1996–2001)
	Nicolás Rodríguez Bautista	Colombia	Commander of National Liberation Army
	Nông Đức Mạnh	Vietnam	General Secretary of the Communist Party of Vietnam (2001–2011)
	Palestinian Security Services	Palestine	Armed forces and intelligence agencies of the State of Palestine
	Paul Kagame	Rwanda	President of Rwanda (2000–present)
	Robert Mugabe	Zimbabwe	President of Zimbabwe (1987–2017)
	Saddam Hussein	Iraq	President of Iraq (1979–2003)
	Saparmurat Niyazov	Turkmenistan	President of Turkmenistan (1991–2006)
	Shaul Mofaz	Israel	Defense Minister of Israel (2002–2006)
	Teodoro Obiang Nguema Mbasogo	Equatorial Guinea	President of Equatorial Guinea (1979–present)
	Than Shwe	Myanmar	Chairman of the State Peace and Development Council (1992–2011); Commander-in-Chief of the Armed Forces of Myanmar (1992–2011); Prime Minister of Myanmar (1992–2003)
	Vladimir Putin	Russia	President of Russia (2000–2008 and 2012–present); Prime Minister of Russia (2008–2012)
	Zine El Abidine Ben Ali	Tunisia	President of Tunisia (1987–2011)

== Digital press freedom predators ==
In March 2020, as part of the World Day Against Cyber-Censorship, the Reporters Without Borders published a list of digital press freedom predators. The list includes:

=== Harassment ===
Name	Country	Description
Electronic Flies	Algeria	Army of internet trolls in the Algerian government’s payroll. Their main task is to discredit all journalists critical of the government by engaging in online abuse, posting personal information about them and public reporting of critical posts in online platforms in order to remove them.
Hate Office	Brazil	Consisting of close presidential advisers of President of Brazil Jair Bolsonaro and coordinated by his son Carlos, the group publishes attacks against journalists on a large scale by engaging in social media campaigns of insults and threats. The existence of such group was revealed by Brazilian parliamentarian and former ally of Bolsonaro Joice Hasselmann.
Modi's Yoddhas	India	Internet trolls who either volunteer their services or are paid employees of the ruling Hindu nationalist Bharatiya Janata Party (BJP) and are supporters of the current Prime Minister of India Narendra Modi. They engage in social media insults, calls for rape and death threats against critics of Modi. Yoddhas in Hindi language means 'warriors'.
The Kremlin's Troll Army	Russia	An internet troll army which have an implicit backing of the Government of Russia and President of Russia Vladimir Putin. They spread false reports and videos, engage in doxing and defamation against critics of Putin, and also spread propaganda about those who denounce their activities.
Troll Gangs	Mexico	An internet troll group who have engaged in social media smears, threats and insults against journalists who have questioned President of Mexico Andrés Manuel López Obrador’s decision to release drug lord El Chapo’s son Ovidio Guzmán López.

=== State censorship ===
Image	Name	Country	Role
	Cyberspace Administration of China	China	The central internet regulator, censor, oversight, and control agency for the People's Republic of China. The agency engages in internet censorship and supervision of private-sector platforms such as Baidu, WeChat, Weibo and Douyin, and blocking and deleting content and apps. During the COVID–19 pandemic in China, the agency has suppressed social media accounts of media outlets and bloggers, and censored news outlets critical of the government's handling of the pandemic.
	Ministry of Home Affairs	India	The ministry of the Government of India, which is mainly responsible for the maintenance of internal security and domestic policy of the country. On 5 August 2019, it completely disconnected internet communication in the Indian state of Jammu and Kashmir, resulting in Kashmiri journalists unable to work freely and depriving all of the state's residents from accessing independently reported news and information. Despite broadband connections being partially restored after six months, access to many sites remains largely uncertain and India is the country that most uses Internet shutdowns, with a total of 121 in 2019.
	National Commission of Telecommunications (Conatel)	Venezuela	An agency of the Government of Venezuela that exercises the regulation, supervision and control over telecommunications. It orders the blocking of websites that are critical of the authorities of the government and many have been blocked without any possibility of appeal. The agency also temporarily blocks social media platforms such as Facebook, especially when opposition leader Juan Guaidó’s speeches are being broadcast live on Facebook.
	Roskomnadzor (Federal Service for Supervision of Communications, Information Technology and Mass Media)	Russia	The Russian federal executive agency responsible for monitoring, controlling and censoring Russian mass media. It has blocked more than 490,000 websites without warning and without respecting legal procedure, and maintains a secret blacklist of banned sites. The agency also blocks platforms and apps that refuse to store their data on servers in Russia or provide the Russian authorities the means to decrypt messages.
	Supreme Council of Cyberspace	Iran	The agency was created in 2012, and consists of senior military and political figures. They engage in online selective access and control, blocking news websites, social media platforms and messaging apps such as Telegram, Signal, WhatsApp, Facebook and Twitter. Internet shutdowns are increasingly used to contain and suppress waves of street protests in the country, and publishing independent information are regarded as “counter-revolutionary” or “subversive” in nature.
	Supreme Council for Media Regulation (SCMR)	Egypt	The agency was created in 2017 to "devise and implement the media strategy for the Egyptian state." It engages in the blocking of news sites and messaging apps under the grounds that they publish false information. More than 500 websites and 11 messaging apps are currently inaccessible in Egypt.

=== Disinformation ===
Name	Country	Description
Call Centre Hubs	Philippines	Consisting of supporters of President of the Philippines Rodrigo Duterte, they disseminate fake memes, maliciously edited content and conduct targeted harassment campaigns with the aim of smearing the media and manipulating public opinion. They had launched a campaign to smear and boycott the ABS-CBN radio and TV network with the aim of blocking the renewal of its licence.
Cyber Jihadist Unit	Sudan	The internet troll army that was created by the National Intelligence and Security Service, which spies on activists, politicians and journalists on social media. It also disseminates messages and articles with false information designed to discredit members of the current transitional government.
Force 47	Vietnam	An internet army of 10,100 cyber soldiers run by the Ministry of Public Security. They are tasked with setting up, moderating and posting on pro-state Facebook groups. The group is also considered the largest and most sophisticated influence network in Southeast Asia.
Saudi Electronic Brigade	Saudi Arabia	Led by Saud al-Qahtani, the then advisor to Crown Prince Mohammed bin Salman, the network of pro-Saudi Twitter trolls and bots used to produce more than 2,500 tweets a day consisting of false information and hate messages against the critics of the Government of Saudi Arabia.

=== Spying surveillance ===
Name	Country	Description
Gamma Group	Germany; United Kingdom	An Anglo-German technology company that sells surveillance software to governments and police forces around the world. The FinFisher software, which was developed by the company, has been used by undemocratic regimes to spy on activists and journalists.
Memento Labs (formerly known as Hacking Team)	Italy; Saudi Arabia; Switzerland	The company created spyware capable of extracting files from a targeted device, intercepting emails and instant messages, and activating a device's webcam or microphone, which was then sold to law enforcement and intelligence agencies.
Mollitiam Industries	Spain	A Spanish software company that developed tools for intercepting phone calls and emails. One of the customers of its product is the Colombian Armed Forces, which used it to illegally spy on supreme court judges, politicians, journalists and journalists’ sources.
NSO Group	Israel	An Israeli technology firm primarily known for its proprietary spyware Pegasus, which uses a WhatsApp flaw to install on targeted smartphones and send them infected files that open automatically. The spyware has been used to target human rights activists and journalists in various countries.
Zerodium (formerly known as Vupen)	United States	An American information security company based in Washington, D.C. and Europe, which pays bounties to hackers and security researchers to be exclusively informed about their discoveries, which is used to spy on journalists to foreign governments.
