= Bamboo diplomacy (Vietnam) =

Vietnam's foreign policy and doctrine

Bamboo diplomacy (ngoại giao cây tre) refers to Vietnam's distinctive approach to foreign relations, rooted in principles of flexibility, resilience, and independence. The diplomatic strategy emphasizes maintaining a firm stance on national sovereignty and independence whilst adapting to the complex and shifting dynamics of global geopolitics; drawing inspiration from the bamboo plant, which holds deep cultural significance in Vietnam. First introduced in 2016 by Nguyễn Phú Trọng, the General Secretary of the Communist Party of Vietnam, bamboo diplomacy has become a central tenet of Vietnam's foreign policy, guiding the country's engagement with both traditional and emerging global powers.

Communist Party of Vietnam's foreign policy approach is designed to maximize its national interests while avoiding entanglement in the rivalries of larger states. It involves actively engaging with international organizations and global partners to maintain a peaceful and stable environment for domestic development. At the heart of this strategy is Vietnam's ability to balance its relationships with both China and the United States, two superpowers that vie for influence in Southeast Asia. This balancing act is essential for Vietnam's security and economic prosperity, making bamboo diplomacy a dynamic tool for navigating the complexities of 21st-century geopolitics.

== Origins and Philosophical Underpinnings ==
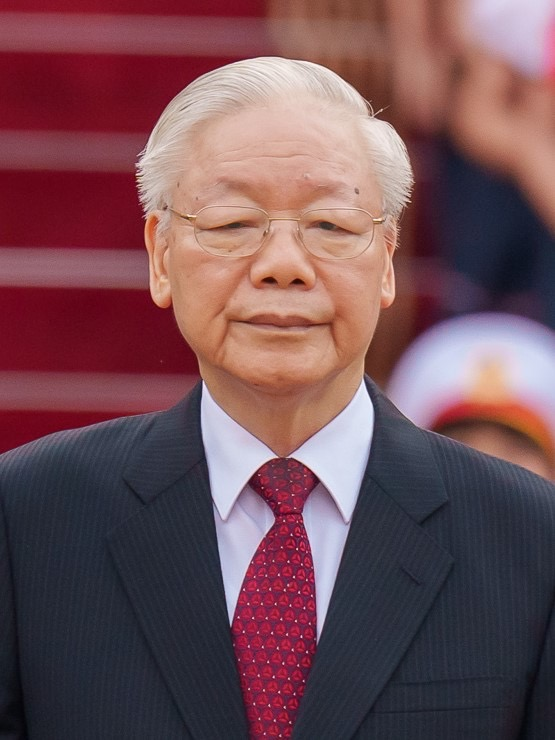
Nguyen Phu Trong (Vietnam's General Secretary) who introduced the bamboo diplomacy in 2016

The concept of bamboo diplomacy was formally introduced during the 29th Diplomatic Conference in 2016 by General Secretary Nguyen Phu Trong. Drawing upon the symbolism of bamboo, Trong likened Vietnam's foreign policy to the plant's resilience and flexibility. Bamboo, which stands firm against strong winds while bending to avoid breaking, serves as an apt metaphor for Vietnam's ability to maintain its independence while being adaptable in a turbulent international environment.

At the philosophical level, bamboo diplomacy is grounded in the teachings of Ho Chi Minh, the founder of modern Vietnam. Ho Chi Minh's diplomatic thought emphasized national independence, resilience, and the harmonious integration of domestic and international values. Ho believed in balancing self-reliance with international cooperation, which has since become a cornerstone of Vietnam's foreign policy. The Doi Moi reforms of the late 1980s further institutionalized this approach, transitioning Vietnam from an ideologically driven foreign policy to one based on pragmatic national interests.

== Diplomatic Strategy and Implementation ==
Vietnam operationalizes bamboo diplomacy through proactive and diverse engagement with the global community. Vietnam has established diplomatic relations with 190 out of 192 United Nations member states and participates actively in over 70 international organizations and forums, such as ASEAN, APEC, and the World Trade Organization (WTO). This policy reflects a commitment to broadening Vietnam's global ties, ensuring that the country maintains balanced relations with both longstanding partners like China and Russia, and newer, strategic allies such as the United States, Japan, and India.

One of the defining features of bamboo diplomacy is Vietnam's ability to maintain practical neutrality and avoid taking sides in geopolitical conflicts, especially in the context of great power competition between China and the United States. This neutral stance allows Vietnam to benefit economically and strategically from both sides, while ensuring that it does not become overly dependent on or beholden to any single global power. For example, while Vietnam has deepened security cooperation with the U.S. in recent years, it has also maintained strong trade and political relations with China. However, it is worth mentioning that Vietnamese official narratives tend to avoid the direct mentioning the term "neutrality" as well as its forms and alternative implementations, while in fact impliedly disagree with its policies' imposed association to neutrality. Late Vietnam People's Army Colonel General Nguyễn Chí Vịnh once stated Vietnam "is not neutral but instead independent", citing differences between the definitions of "independence" versus "neutrality".

Vietnam's diplomatic efforts also focus on expanding sectoral partnerships in key industries such as the energy transition and semiconductors. These partnerships are critical to Vietnam's long-term development goals, which aim to transform the country into a high-income nation by 2045.

== Similar Concepts in Global Diplomacy ==
While bamboo diplomacy is unique to Vietnam, several other diplomatic strategies from around the world share similar characteristics, especially in terms of balancing flexibility, neutrality, and independence. These concepts highlight the diplomatic approaches of countries that navigate between larger powers while maintaining their own sovereignty:

- Finland's "Active Neutrality" (or "Finlandization"): Finland practiced a policy of neutrality during the Cold War to maintain good relations with both the Soviet Union and the West while preserving its sovereignty.
- Sweden's Neutrality Policy: Sweden has long maintained a policy of neutrality, avoiding military alliances while engaging in robust economic and diplomatic relations globally.
- India's Non-Alignment Movement: During the Cold War, India pursued a policy of non-alignment, avoiding alliances with either the Western bloc or the Soviet bloc while seeking to maintain its independence and promote global peace.
- Singapore's Balance of Relations: Singapore's foreign policy is centered on balancing its relations with both China and the U.S., ensuring that its economic and security interests are protected while maintaining its independence.
- Swiss Neutrality: Switzerland's centuries-old policy of neutrality ensures that the country remains independent while fostering strong global ties, much like Vietnam's approach to balancing global relationships.
- ASEAN's Centrality: As a key player in ASEAN, Vietnam practices bamboo diplomacy in line with ASEAN's centrality principle, which emphasizes neutrality and stability in the region while engaging with global powers.
- Malaysia's Quiet Diplomacy: Malaysia often practices "quiet diplomacy", particularly in managing sensitive regional issues such as disputes in the South China Sea, reflecting a similar approach to Vietnam's pragmatic foreign policy.
- Japan's Proactive Pacifism: Japan's foreign policy of proactive pacifism seeks to promote peace and stability while balancing relations with both the U.S. and China, akin to Vietnam's bamboo diplomacy.

== Achievements ==
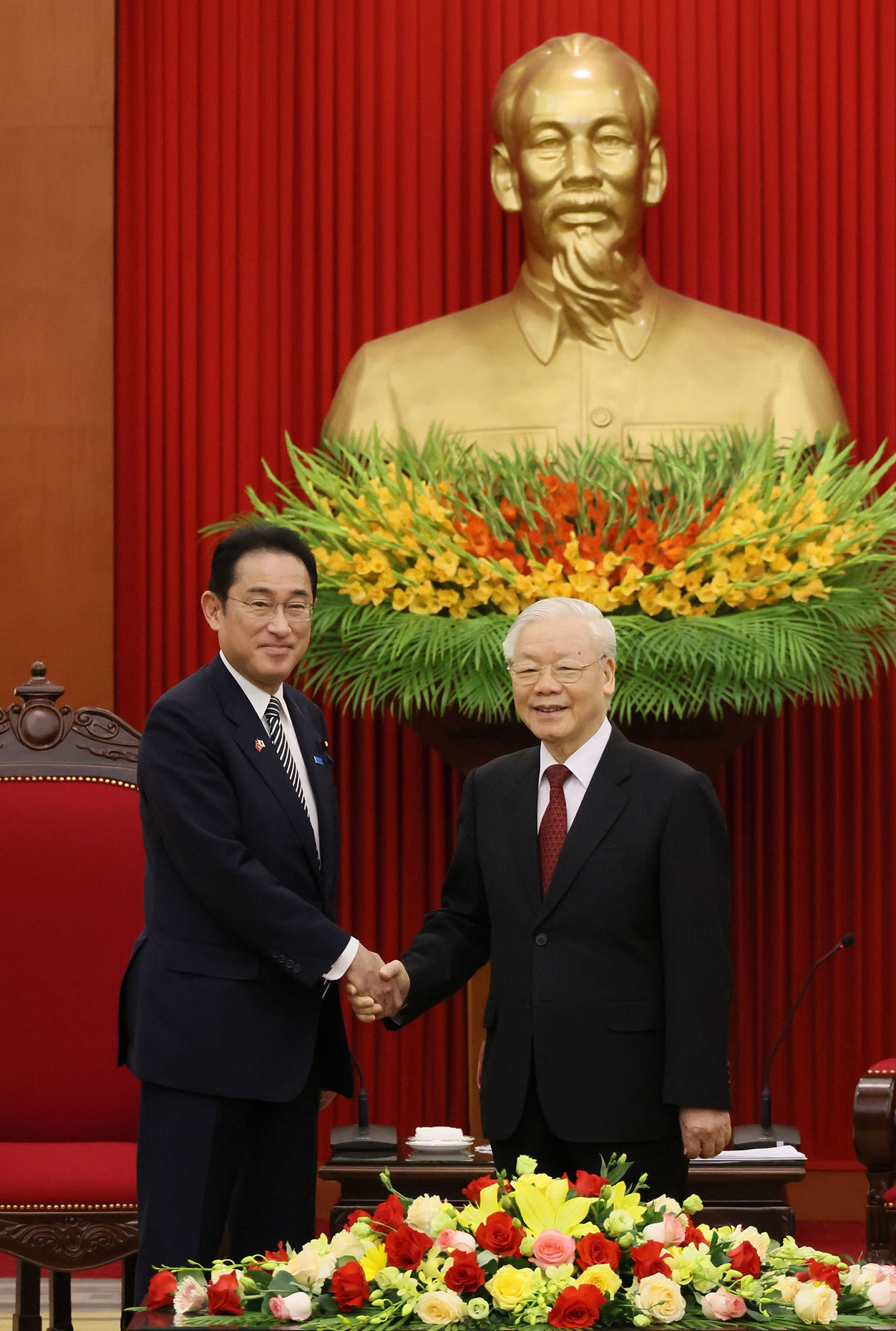
Trọng with Japanese prime minister Fumio Kishida in 2022

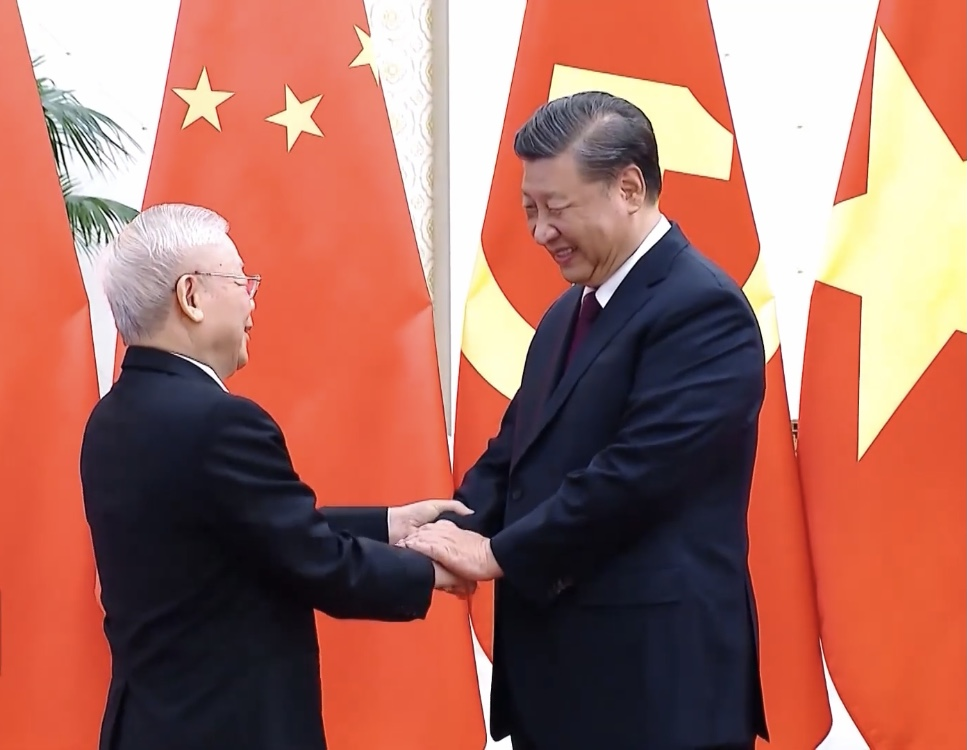
Trọng with CCP general secretary Xi Jinping in October 2022

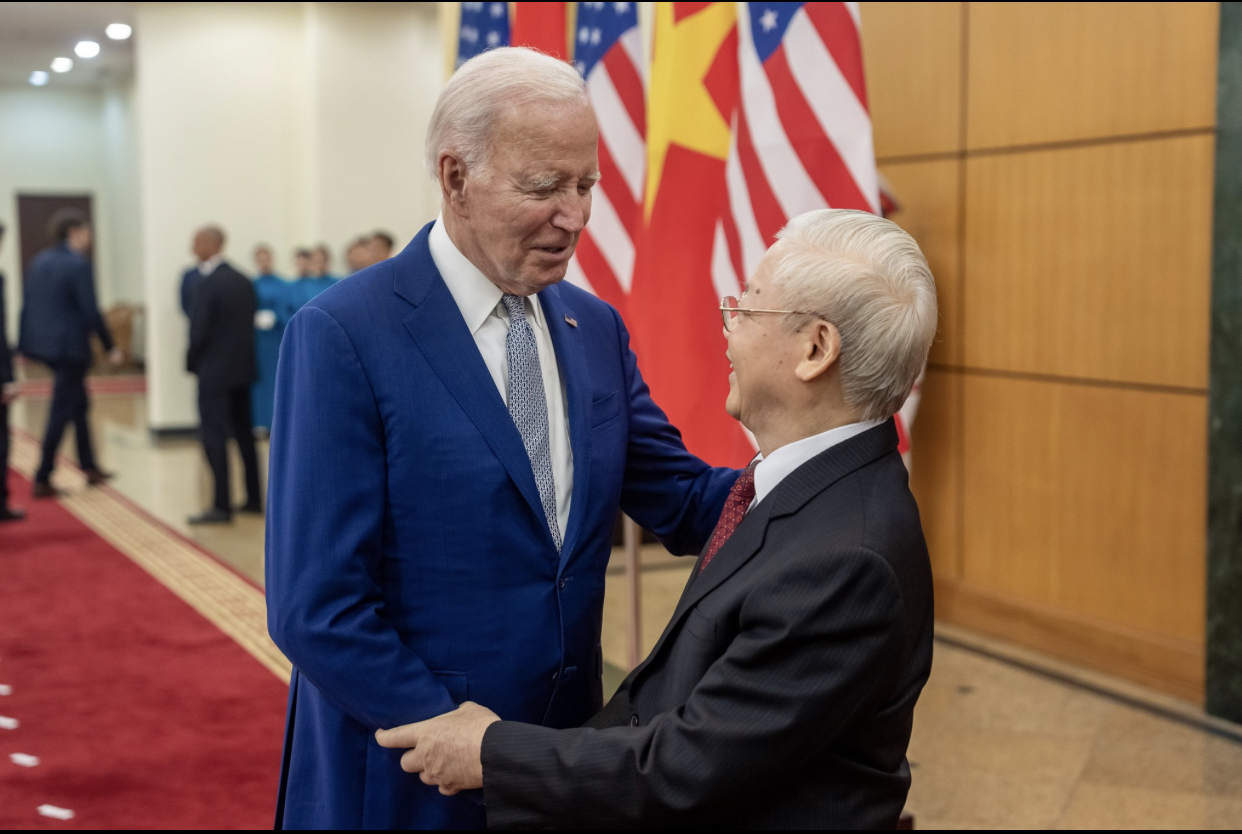
Trọng with U.S. president Joe Biden in September 2023

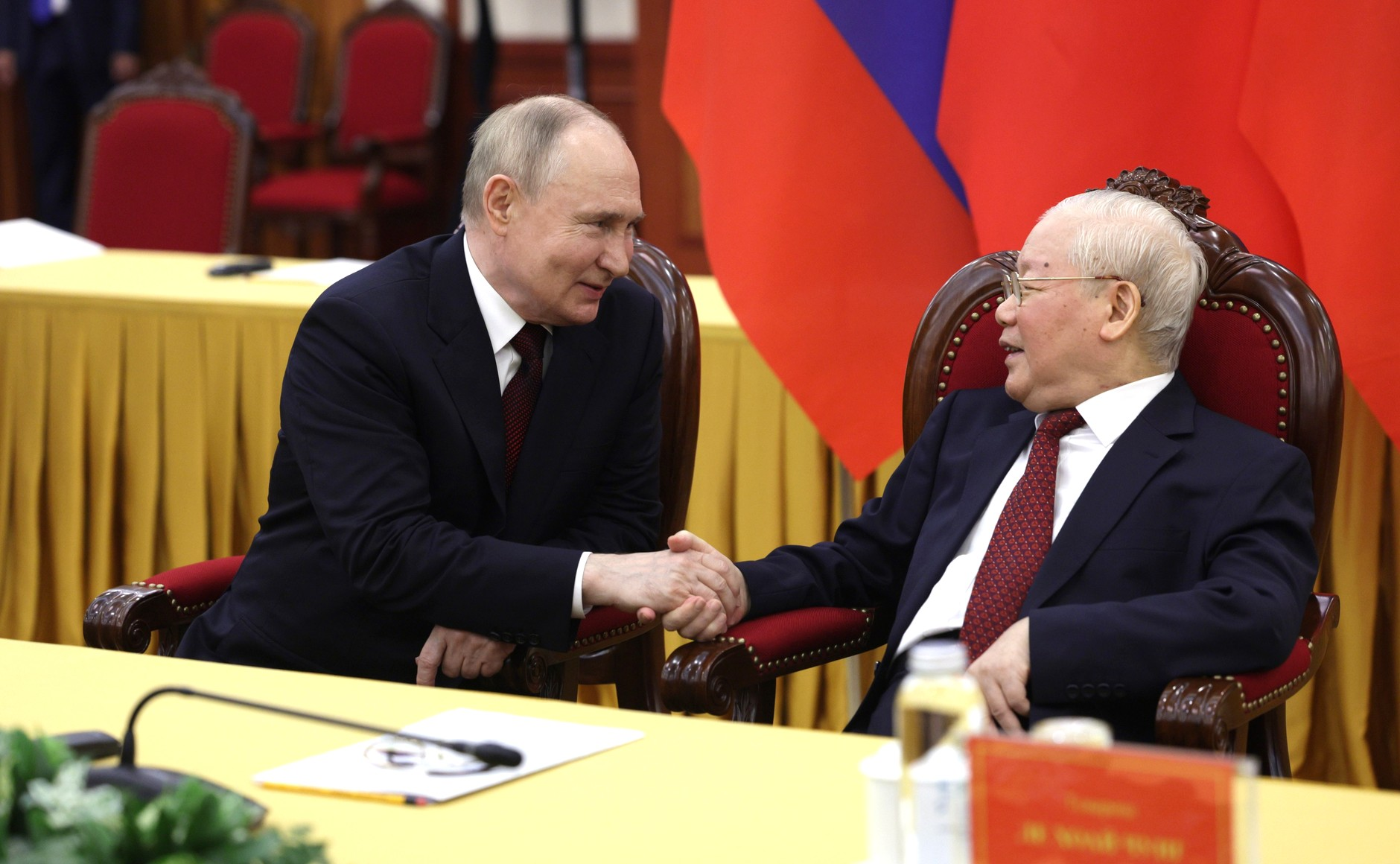
Trọng with Russian president Vladimir Putin in Hanoi, June 2024. It was his last public appearance.

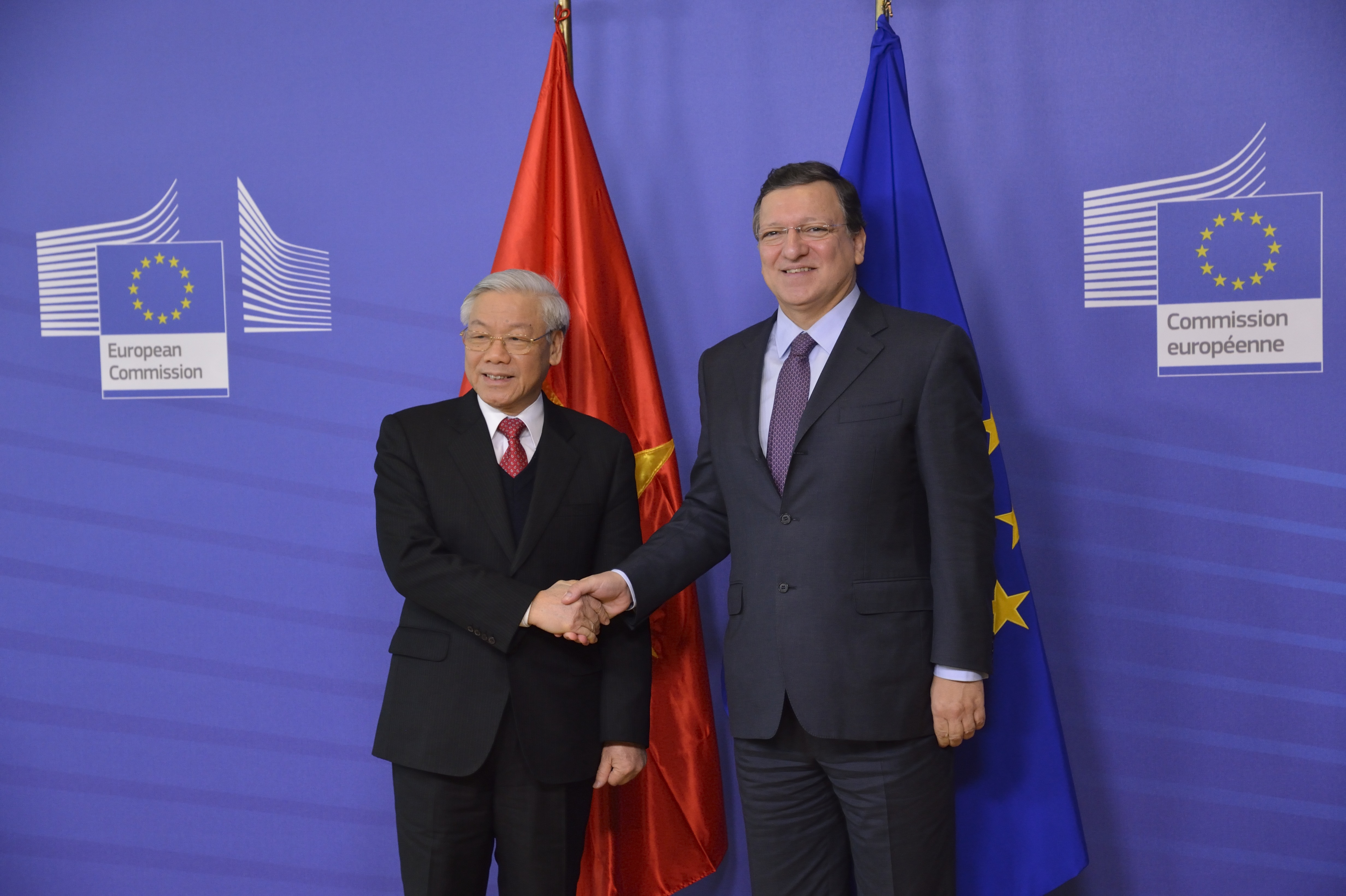
Trọng with President of the European Commission José Manuel Barroso in 2013

Vietnam's bamboo diplomacy has resulted in notable diplomatic successes that have increased the country's stature on the global stage. Vietnam has successfully hosted major international summits, such as the APEC Summit, the ASEAN Summit, and the World Economic Forum on ASEAN, showcasing its role as a responsible and active participant in global governance. The country has also demonstrated its commitment to peace and stability through its participation in UN peacekeeping missions and its role as a non-permanent member of the UN Security Council.

Economic diplomacy has been another key success of Vietnam's foreign policy. Thanks to the country's diplomatic efforts, Vietnam has signed numerous free trade agreements, including the Comprehensive and Progressive Agreement for Trans-Pacific Partnership (CPTPP) and the EU-Vietnam Free Trade Agreement (EVFTA). These agreements have contributed to Vietnam's economic growth by expanding trade partnerships and attracting foreign investment.

Moreover, Vietnam has built strategic partnerships with major global powers, including all five permanent members of the UN Security Council (China, France, Russia, the UK, and the US), further cementing its international influence. The country's ability to strengthen ties with these powers while maintaining its neutrality has become one of the cornerstones of bamboo diplomacy.

== Challenges ==
Despite the successes, Vietnam's bamboo diplomacy faces several challenges in an increasingly polarized and unpredictable global environment. Some of these pressing issues are navigating the ongoing Russia-Ukraine war as well as the Gaza war, which has put pressure on Vietnam to balance its historical ties with Russia against its growing relationships with Western countries like the United States and Israel. This balancing act requires Vietnam to maintain its diplomatic neutrality while facing criticism for not taking a firmer stance against Russia's and later, Israel's actions.

In addition, China's increasing assertiveness in the South China Sea remains a significant challenge for Vietnam. While Vietnam has worked to maintain a peaceful and cooperative relationship with China, its territorial claims in the South China Sea have led to tensions, forcing Vietnam to carefully navigate its diplomatic strategy to avoid direct conflict while defending its sovereignty.

Domestically, Vietnam must address internal issues such as labor productivity and economic reforms to maintain its competitiveness and continue attracting foreign investment. The country's ability to balance these internal challenges with its diplomatic efforts is crucial to sustaining its economic growth and international standing.
