= Historical revisionism =

Reinterpretation of a historical account

In historiography, historical revisionism is the reinterpretation of a historical account. It involves challenging the orthodox (established, accepted or traditional) scholarly views or narratives regarding a historical event, timespan, or phenomenon by introducing contrary evidence or reinterpreting the motivations of the people involved. Revision of the historical record can reflect new discoveries of fact, evidence, and interpretation as they come to light. The process of historical revision is a common, necessary, and usually uncontroversial process which develops and refines the historical record to make it more complete and accurate. Debate forms an essential part of the practice of history: in the words of Simon Schama: "History is argument".

One form of historical revisionism involves denying the moral significance or accuracy of the historical record. This type of historical revisionism, called "historical negationism", is contentious if it includes denying the veracity of genuine documents, or deliberately manipulating statistical data to reach predetermined conclusions. The destruction or alteration of cultural-heritage sites is also considered a form of illegitimate historical revisionism when it serves to deny the cultural or historical claims of ethnic groups. Negationists may use the term "revisionism" to portray their pseudoscholarship as legitimate, especially in the context of genocide denial.

== Background ==
Historical revisionism is the means by which the historical record, the history of a society, as understood in its collective memory, continually accounts for new facts and interpretations of the events.

Revisionist historians contest the mainstream or traditional view of historical events and raise views at odds with traditionalists. In the field of historiography, the historian who works within the existing establishment of society and has produced a body of history books from which he or she can claim authority, usually benefits from the status quo. As such, historical revisionism can produce significant controversy within society.

Revisionist history is often practiced by those who are in the minority, such as feminist historians, ethnic minority historians, those working outside of mainstream academia in smaller and less known universities, or the youngest scholars, essentially historians who have the most to gain and the least to lose in challenging the status quo. In the friction between the mainstream of accepted beliefs and the new perspectives of historical revisionism, received historical ideas are either changed, solidified, or clarified. If over a period of time, the revisionist ideas become the new establishment status quo a paradigm shift is said to have occurred.

Historians are influenced by the zeitgeist (spirit of the time), and the usually progressive changes to society, politics, and culture, such as occurred after the Second World War (1939–1945); in The Future of the Past (1989), the historian C. Vann Woodward said:

...these developments will and should raise new questions about the past, and affect our reading of large areas of history, and my belief is that future revisions may be extensive enough to justify calling the coming age of historiography an "Age of Reinterpretation". The first illustration happens to come mainly from American history, but this should not obscure the broader scope of the revolution, which has no national limitations.

The philosopher of science, Thomas Kuhn, said, in contrast to the quantifiable hard sciences, characterized by a single paradigm, the social sciences are characterized by several paradigms that derive from a "tradition of claims, counterclaims, and debates over [the] fundamentals" of research. The philosopher Karl Popper said that "each generation has its own troubles and problems, and, therefore, its own interests and its own point of view."

== Negationism and denial ==
Historians distinguish historical revisionism from historical negationism, which is a form of denialism.

In contrast, historical revisionism entails the refinement of existing knowledge about a historical event, not a denial of the event, itself; that such refinement of history emerges from the examination of new, empirical evidence, and a re-examination, and consequent re-interpretation of the existing documentary evidence. That legitimate historical revisionism acknowledges the existence of a "certain body of irrefutable evidence" and the existence of a "convergence of evidence", which suggest that an event – such as the Black Death, American slavery, and the Holocaust – did occur; whereas the denialism of history rejects the entire foundation of historical evidence. Historian Deborah Lipstadt states that Holocaust deniers, such as Harry Elmer Barnes, disingenuously self-identify as "historical revisionists" to obscure their denialism as academic revision of the historical record.

== Basis for historical revision ==
The process of historical revision involves updating the historical record to accommodate developments as they arise. The historical record may be revised to accommodate for a number of academic reasons, including the following:

=== Access to new data/records ===
The release, discovery, or publicization of documents previously unknown may lead scholars to hold new views of well established events. For example, archived or sealed government records (often related to national security) will become available under the thirty-year rule and similar laws. Such documents can provide new sources and therefore new analyses of past events that will alter the historical perspective.

With the release of the ULTRA archives in the 1970s under the British thirty-year rule, much of the Allied high command tactical decisionmaking process was re-evaluated, particularly the Battle of the Atlantic. Before the release of the ULTRA archives, there was much debate over whether Field Marshal Bernard Montgomery could have known that Arnhem was heavily garrisoned. With the release of the archives, which indicated that he could, the balance of the evidence swung in the direction of his detractors. The release of the ULTRA archives also forced a re-evaluation of the history of the electronic computer. (Note: In 1972, before the release of official documents about ULTRA, Herman Goldstine wrote in The Computer from Pascal to von Neumann page 321 that: "Britain had such vitality that it could immediately after the war embark on so many well-conceived and well-executed projects in the computer field." In 1976 after the archive were opened Brian Randell wrote in The COLOSSUS on page 87 that: "the COLOSSUS project was an important source of this vitality, one that has been largely unappreciated, as has the significance of its places in the chronology of the invention of the digital computer.")

=== New sources in other languages ===
As more sources in other languages become available historians may review their theories in light of the new sources. The revision of the meaning of the Dark Ages is an example.

=== Developments in other fields of science ===
DNA analysis has had an impact in various areas of history either confirming established historical theories or presenting new evidence that undermines the current established historical explanation. Professor Andrew Sherratt, a British prehistorian, was responsible for introducing the work of anthropological writings on the consumption of legal and illegal drugs and how to use the papers to explain certain aspects of prehistoric societies. Carbon dating, the examination of ice cores and tree rings, palynology, scanning electron microscope analysis of early metal samples, and measuring oxygen isotopes in bones, have all provided new data in the last few decades with which to argue new hypotheses. Extracting ancient DNA allows historians to debate the meaning and importance of race and indeed current identities.

=== Nationalism ===
Government bodies may engage in historical revisionism for political gain. For example, in schoolbooks' history on Europe, it is possible to read about an event from completely different perspectives. In the Battle of Waterloo, most British, French, Dutch and German schoolbooks slant the battle to emphasise the importance of the contribution of their nations. Sometimes, the name of an event is used to convey political or a national perspective. For example, the same conflict between two English-speaking countries is known by two different names: the "American War of Independence" and the "American Revolutionary War". As perceptions of nationalism change, so do the areas of history that are driven by such ideas. Wars are contests between enemies, and postwar histories select the facts and interpretations to suit their internal needs, The Korean War, for example, has sharply different interpretations in textbooks in the countries involved.

=== Culture ===
For example, as regionalism has regained some of its old prominence in British politics, some historians have suggested that the older studies of the English Civil War were centred on England and that to understand the war, events that had previously been dismissed as on the periphery should be given greater prominence. To emphasise this, revisionist historians have suggested that the English Civil War becomes just one of a number of interlocking conflicts known as Wars of the Three Kingdoms. Furthermore, as cultures develop, it may become strategically advantageous for some revision-minded groups to revise their public historical narrative in such a way so as to either discover, or in rarer cases manufacture, a precedent which contemporary members of the given subcultures can use as a basis or rationale for reform or change. Sociological studies show that citizen journalists and amateur investigators often re-examine official historical records to challenge state secrecy and institutional control over information. Researchers note that this type of public inquiry helps democratic societies question accepted narratives and bring overlooked evidence to light. By directly analyzing public records rather than accepting official consensus, everyday researchers contribute to the ongoing process of revising and refining historical accounts.

=== Ideology ===
For example, in the 1940s, it became fashionable to see the English Civil War from a Marxist school of thought. In the words of Christopher Hill, "the Civil War was a class war." After World War II, the influence of Marxist interpretation waned in British academia and by the 1970s this view came under attack by a new school of revisionists and it has been largely overturned as a major mainstream explanation of the mid-17th-century conflict in England, Scotland, and Ireland.

=== Historical causation ===
Issues of causation in history are often revised with new research: for example, by the mid-20th century the status quo was to see the French Revolution as the result of the triumphant rise of a new middle class. Research in the 1960s prompted by revisionist historians like Alfred Cobban and François Furet revealed the social situation was much more complex, and the question of what caused the revolution is now closely debated.

== Specific issues ==
=== Dark Ages ===
As non-Latin texts, such as Welsh, Gaelic and the Norse sagas have been analysed and added to the canon of knowledge about the period, and as much more archaeological evidence has come to light, the period known as the Dark Ages has narrowed to the point that many historians no longer believe that such a term is useful. Moreover, the term dark implies less of a void of culture and law but more a lack of many source texts in Mainland Europe. Many modern scholars who study the era tend to avoid the term altogether for its negative connotations and find it misleading and inaccurate for any part of the Middle Ages.

=== Feudalism ===
The concept of feudalism has been questioned. Revisionist scholars led by historian Elizabeth A. R. Brown have rejected the term.

=== New World discovery and European colonization of the Americas ===
In recounting the European colonization of the Americas, some history books of the past paid little attention to the indigenous peoples of the Americas, usually mentioning them only in passing and making no attempt to understand the events from their point of view. That was reflected in the description of Christopher Columbus having discovered America. Those events' portrayal has since been revised to avoid the word "discovery."

In his 1990 book, The Conquest of Paradise, Kirkpatrick Sale argued that Christopher Columbus was an imperialist bent on conquest from his first voyage. In a New York Times book review, historian and member of the Christopher Columbus Quincentenary Jubilee Committee William Hardy McNeill wrote about Sale:

"He has set out to destroy the heroic image that earlier writers have transmitted to us. Mr. Sale makes Columbus out to be cruel, greedy and incompetent (even as a sailor), and a man who was perversely intent on abusing the natural paradise on which he intruded."

McNeill declares Sale's work to be "unhistorical, in the sense that [it] selects from the often-cloudy record of Columbus's actual motives and deeds what suits the researcher's 20th-century purposes." McNeill states that detractors and advocates of Columbus present a "sort of history [that] caricatures the complexity of human reality by turning Columbus into either a bloody ogre or a plaster saint, as the case may be."

=== New Qing history ===
Historians in China and from abroad long wrote that the Manchus who conquered China and established the Qing dynasty (1636–1912) adopted the customs and institutions of the Han Chinese dynasties that preceded them and were "sinicized", that is, absorbed into Chinese culture. In 1990 American historians explored Manchu language sources and newly accessible imperial archives, and discovered that the emperors retained their Manchu culture and that they regarded China proper as only one part of their larger empire. These scholars differ among themselves but agree on a major revision of the history of the Qing dynasty.

=== French attack formations in the Napoleonic wars ===
The military historian James R. Arnold argues that the writings of Sir Charles Oman and Sir John Fortescue dominated English-language Napoleonic history. In particular, they said that the French infantry used heavy columns to attack lines of infantry. However, by 1998, two books on Napoleonic battle tactics caused a paradigm shift, as both claimed that the French fought in line at Maida and both fully explored French tactical variety. The Battle of Maida 1806: Fifteen Minutes of Glory, published in 2002, argued that "General Compère's brigade formed into line to attack Kempt's Light Battalion," and the Battle of Maida took place in less than 15 minutes. Arnold considered the book to have ended the debate on column versus line.

=== Argentine Civil Wars ===
After the proclamation of the Argentine Republic in late 1861, its first de facto President, Bartolomé Mitre, wrote the first Argentine historiographical works: Historia de Belgrano y de la Independencia Argentina and Historia de San Martín y de la emancipación sudamericana. Although these were criticised by renowned intellectuals such as Dalmacio Vélez Sarsfield and Juan Bautista Alberdi and even by some colleagues like Adolfo Saldías, both stated a liberal-conservative bias on Argentine history through the National Academy of History established in 1893, despite the existence of caudillos and gauchos.

During the Radical Civic Union government of Hipólito Yrigoyen, historians followed the revisionist view of anti-mitrist politicians such as Carlos D'Amico, Ernesto Quesada and David Peña and their theories reached the academy thanks to Dardo Corvalán Mendilharsu. Argentine historical revisionism could reach its peak during the peronist government. In 2011, the Manuel Dorrego National Institute of Argentine and Iberoamerican Historical Revisionism was established by the Secretary of Culture, but this one suffered a rupture between 21st century socialists and nationalists. Three weeks after the Inauguration of Mauricio Macri, the institute was closed.

=== Within the United States of America ===
The historian and American Historical Association member James M. McPherson has said:

The fourteen-thousand members of this association [i.e., the American Historical Association], however, know that revision is the lifeblood of historical scholarship. History is a continuing dialogue, between the present and the past. Interpretations of the past are subject to change in response to new evidence, new questions asked of the evidence, new perspectives gained by the passage of time. There is no single, eternal, and immutable "truth" about past events and their meaning. The unending quest of historians for understanding the past – that is, revisionism – is what makes history vital and meaningful ... Supreme Court decisions often reflect a "revisionist" interpretation of history as well as of the Constitution.

On resistance to the works of revised history that present a culturally-comprehensive historical narrative of the US, the perspectives of black people, women, and the labour movement, the historian David Williams said:

These, and other, scholarly voices, called for a more comprehensive treatment of American history, stressing that the mass of Americans, not simply the power élites, made history. Yet, it was mainly white males of the power élite who had the means to attend college, become professional historians, and shape a view of history that served their own class, race, and gender interests at the expense of those not so fortunate – and, quite literally, to paper over aspects of history they found uncomfortable. "One is astonished in the study of history", wrote Du Bois in 1935, "at the recurrence of the idea that evil must be forgotten, distorted, skimmed over.... The difficulty, of course, with this philosophy is that history loses its value, as an incentive and [as] an example; it paints perfect men and noble nations, but it does not tell the truth".

After the Second World War, the study and production of history in the US was expanded by the G.I. Bill, which funding allowed "a new and more broadly-based generation of scholars" with perspectives and interpretations drawn from the feminist movement, the Civil Rights Movement, and the American Indian Movement. That expansion and deepening of the pool of historians voided the existence of a definitive and universally-accepted history, therefore, is presented by the revisionist historian to the national public with a history that has been corrected and augmented with new facts, evidence, and interpretations of the historical record. In The Cycles of American History (1986), in contrasting and comparing the US and the Soviet Union during the Cold War (1945–1991), the historian Arthur M. Schlesinger Jr. said:

... but others, especially in the United States.... represent what American historians call revisionism – that is readiness to challenge official explanations. No one should be surprised by this phenomenon. Every war in American history has been followed, in due course, by skeptical reassessments of supposedly sacred assumptions... for [historical] revisionism is an essential part of the process, by which history, through the posing of new problems and the investigation of new possibilities, enlarges its perspectives and enriches its insights.

The historian Forrest McDonald is often critical of the turn that revisionism has taken but admits that the turmoil of the 1960s America has changed the way history was written:

The result, as far as the study of history was concerned, was an awakened interest in subjects that historians had previously slighted. Indian history, black history, women's history, family history, and a host of specializations arose. These expanded horizons enriched our understanding of the American past, but they also resulted in works of special pleading, trivialization, and downright falsification.

In 1986, the historian John Hope Franklin described four stages in the historiography of the African experience of life in the US, which were based upon different models of historical consensus.

=== World War I ===
==== German guilt ====
In reaction to the orthodox interpretation enshrined in the Versailles Treaty, which declared that Germany was guilty of starting World War I, the self-described "revisionist" historians of the 1920s rejected the orthodox view and presented a complex causation in which several other countries were equally guilty. Intense debate continues among scholars.

==== Poor British and French military leadership ====
The military leadership of the British Army during World War I was frequently condemned as poor by historians and politicians for decades after the war ended. Common charges were that the generals commanding the army were blind to the realities of trench warfare, ignorant of the conditions of their men and unable to learn from their mistakes, thus causing enormous numbers of casualties ("lions led by donkeys"). However, during the 1960s, historians such as John Terraine began to challenge that interpretation. In recent years, as new documents have come forth and the passage of time has allowed for more objective analysis, historians such as Gary D. Sheffield and Richard Holmes observe that the military leadership of the British Army on the Western Front had to cope with many problems that they could not control, such as a lack of adequate military communications, which had not occurred. Furthermore, military leadership improved throughout the war, culminating in the Hundred Days Offensive advance to victory in 1918. Some historians, even revisionists, still criticise the British High Command severely but are less inclined to portray the war in a simplistic manner with brave troops being led by foolish officers.

There has been a similar movement regarding the French Army during the war with contributions by historians such as Anthony Clayton. Revisionists are far more likely to view commanders such as French General Ferdinand Foch, British General Douglas Haig and other figures, such as American John Pershing, in a sympathetic light.

=== Reconstruction in the United States ===
Revisionist historians of the Reconstruction era of the United States rejected the dominant Dunning School that stated that Black Americans were used by carpetbaggers, and instead stressed economic greed on the part of northern businessmen. Indeed, in recent years a "neoabolitionist" revisionism has become standard; it uses the moral standards of racial equality of the 19th century abolitionists to criticize racial policies. "Foner's book represents the mature and settled Revisionist perspective", historian Michael Perman has concluded regarding Eric Foner's Reconstruction: America's Unfinished Revolution, 1863–1877 (1988).

=== American business and "robber barons" ===
The role of American business and the alleged "robber barons" began to be revised in the 1930s. Termed "business revisionism" by Gabriel Kolko, historians such as Allan Nevins, and then Alfred D. Chandler emphasized the positive contributions of individuals who were previously pictured as villains. Peter Novick writes, "The argument that whatever the moral delinquencies of the robber barons, these were far outweighed by their decisive contributions to American military [and industrial] prowess, was frequently invoked by Allan Nevins."

=== Excess mortality in the Soviet Union under Stalin ===
Prior to the collapse of the Soviet Union and the archival revelations, Western historians estimated that the numbers killed by Stalin's regime were 20 million or higher. After the Soviet Union dissolved, evidence from the Soviet archives also became available and provided information that led to a significant revision in death toll estimates for the Stalin regime, with estimates in the range from 3 million to 9 million. In post-1991 Russia the KGB archives remained briefly open during 1990's, which helped creation of organisations such as Memorial, which engaged in research of the archives and search of secret mass burial grounds. After Putin came to power however, access to archives was restricted again and research in this area once again became politically incorrect, culminating with forcibly shutting down the organization in 2021.

=== Soviet Union and Russia ===
Soviet Union frequently resorted to changing its official history to suit changes in state policy, especially after splits in the Bolshevik leadership or change of political alliances. The book History of the Communist Party of the Soviet Union (Bolsheviks) was subject to numerous such changes to reflect removal of Bolshevik leaders previously trusted by Stalin but did not support him unanimously. Great Soviet Encyclopedia was also redacted frequently, with subscribers of the paper book receiving letter to cut out pages e.g. about Lavrentiy Beria or Nikolai Bukharin and replace them with unrelated articles. Historic photos were also frequently edited to remove people who later lost trust of the Party.

The process of rewriting history of USSR and post-1991 Russia was once again restarted in 2010's after Russia's first attack on Ukraine and intensified after 2022 full-scale invasion in Ukraine. History school books received significant changes which reflected the changes in the official history narratives: for example, while 2010 books openly mentioned decrease of life expectancy in Soviet Union caused shortages and insufficient spending on public healthcare, new 2023 books vaguely states that life expectancy has generally increased and instead focused on unspecified "achievements in the sphere of education and science". In chapters on Stalin, he's once again presented as a great tragedy to ordinary Russians and any mentions of repressions have disappeared. Similar changes were introduced in chapters discussing Soviet economy, space program, Brezhnev, collapse of USSR, perestroika and glasnost, where the phrase "freedom of speech" started to be used in scare quotes and presented as something harmful. Soviet intervention in Afghanistan in 1979 which was presented as Soviet contribution into the fight against radical Islamism, completely contradicting both Soviet and post-Soviet narratives.

Also, since 2014, Russian law enforcement started to prosecute public statements which do not comply with the current version of Russian history. Article 354.1 of Criminal Code of Russia which makes "rehabilitation of Nazism" a crime has been applied both to actual statements praising Nazism, but also to statements which recalled Nazi-Soviet cooperation 1939–1941 or Soviet war crimes conducted in other countries. In some cases article 20.3 of Code of the Russian Federation on Administrative Offenses is also being applied in these cases.

=== Guilt for causing World War II ===
The orthodox interpretation blamed Nazi Germany and Imperial Japan for causing the war. Revisionist historians of World War II, notably Charles A. Beard, said the United States was partly to blame because it pressed the Japanese too hard in 1940 and 1941 and rejected compromises. Other notable contributions to this discourse include Charles Tansill, Back Door To War (1952); Frederic Sanborn, Design For War (1951); and David Hoggan, The Forced War (1989). The British historian A. J. P. Taylor controversially argued that Hitler was an ineffective and inexperienced diplomat and did not deliberately set out to cause a world war.

Patrick Buchanan, an American paleoconservative pundit, argued that the Anglo–French guarantee in 1939 encouraged Poland not to seek a compromise over Danzig. He further argued that Britain and France were in no position to come to Poland's aid, and Hitler was offering the Poles an alliance in return. Buchanan argued the guarantee led the Polish government to transform a minor border dispute into a major world conflict, and handed Eastern Europe, including Poland, to Stalin. Buchanan also argued the guarantee ensured the country would be eventually invaded by the Soviet Union, as Stalin knew the British were in no position to declare war on the Soviet Union in 1939, due to their military weakness.

=== Atomic bombings of Hiroshima and Nagasaki ===
The atomic bombings of Hiroshima and Nagasaki have generated controversy and debate. Historians who accepted President Harry Truman's reasoning in justifying dropping atomic bombs to force Japanese surrender end of World War II are known as "orthodox," while "revisionists" generally deny that the bombs were necessary. Some also claim that Truman knew they were not necessary but wanted to pressure the Soviet Union. These historians see Truman's decision as a major factor in starting the Cold War. This perspective asserts that Truman ignored or downplayed predictions of casualties.

=== Cold War ===
Historians debate the causes and responsibility for the Cold War. The "orthodox" view puts the major blame on the Soviet Union, while a "revisionist" view puts more responsibility on the United States.

==== Vietnam War ====
America in Vietnam (1978), by Guenter Lewy, is an example of historical revisionism that differs much from the popular view of the U.S. in the Vietnam War (1955–75) for which the author was criticized and supported for belonging to the revisionist school on the history of the Vietnam War. Lewy's reinterpretation was the first book of a body of work by historians of the revisionist school about the geopolitical role and the U.S. military behavior in Vietnam.

In the introduction, Lewy said:

It is the reasoned conclusion of this study ... that the sense of guilt created by the Vietnam war in the minds of many Americans is not warranted and that the charges of officially, condoned illegal and grossly immoral conduct are without substance. Indeed, detailed examination of battlefield practices reveals that the loss of civilian life in Vietnam was less great than in World War II [1939–45] and Korea [1950–53] and that concern with minimizing the ravages of the war was strong. To measure and compare the devastation and loss of human life caused by different war will be objectionable to those who repudiate all resort to military force as an instrument of foreign policy and may be construed as callousness. Yet as long as wars do take place at all it remains a moral duty to seek to reduce the agony caused by war, and the fulfillment of this obligation should not be disdained.

— America in Vietnam (1979), p. vii.

Other reinterpretations of the historical record of the U.S. war in Vietnam, which offer alternative explanations for American behavior, include Why We Are in Vietnam (1982), by Norman Podhoretz, Triumph Forsaken: The Vietnam War, 1954–1965 (2006), by Mark Moyar, and Vietnam: The Necessary War (1999), by Michael Lind.

=== Chronological revisionism ===
It is generally accepted that the foundations of modern chronology were laid by the humanist Joseph Scaliger. Isaac Newton in his work The Chronology of Ancient Kingdoms made one of the first attempts to revise the "Scaligerian chronology". In the twentieth century the "revised chronology" of Immanuel Velikovsky can be singled out in this direction, perhaps it initiated a wave of new broad interest in the revision of chronology.

In general, revisionist chronological theories suggest halving the duration of the Christian era, or consider certain historical periods to be erroneously dated, such as Heribert Illig's Phantom time hypothesis or the materials of the "New Chronology", a proposed revision of eras by academician Anatoly Fomenko, albeit one widely rejected by mainstream scholars as pseudoscience.

== See also ==
- Denial
- Dialectic
  - Dialectical research
- Mea culpa
- Official history
- Pseudohistory
- Denial of genocides against Indigenous Peoples
- Denial of Congo Free State Genocide
- Holocaust denial
- Holodomor denial
- Nakba denial
- Historical negationism
- Cambodian genocide denial
- Post-publication peer review
- Denial of the October 7 attacks
- Gaza genocide denial

=== Cases of revisionism ===
- The 1619 Project, a revisionist look at American history with a focus on slavery and its legacy
- Afrocentrism, historical scholarship with a focus on African peoples
- Christ myth theory, a theory that Jesus never existed
- Donation of Constantine, exposure of a forgery
- Historical revision of the Inquisition
- New Historians, a group of Israeli historians with alternative views about Israel's history
- Revisionism (Spain)
- Revisionist school of Islamic studies
