= America in Vietnam =

1978 book by historian Guenter Lewy

- Author: Guenter Lewy
- Language: English
- Subject: Vietnam War
- Genre: Non-fiction
- Publisher: Oxford University Press
- Publication date: 1978

America in Vietnam is a book by Guenter Lewy about America's role in the Vietnam War. The book is highly influential although it has remained controversial even decades after its publication. Lewy contends that the US actions in Vietnam had been neither illegal nor immoral and that tales of American atrocities were greatly exaggerated in what he understands as a "veritable industry" of war crimes allegations.

The text returned to the limelight during the 2004 US presidential election, when it was cited by several groups supporting the reelection of George W. Bush, in contending that Democratic presidential contender John Kerry had betrayed his country for his participation in anti-war activities upon his return from service in Vietnam.

== Overview ==
Published in 1978, America in Vietnam argues against traditional or "orthodox" interpretations of the war as unnecessary, unjust, or unwinnable. The book has proven highly controversial. Historians of the "orthodox" school have singled it out for harsh criticism, while the "revisionist school" of Vietnam historiography holds it to be a watershed in the literature on the war. An infamous text among critics of the Vietnam War, the text has found ardent support among the revisionist minority of academics, such as Norman Podhoretz, Mark Moyar, and Michael Lind. America in Vietnam is frequently characterized as a "revisionist" history of the Vietnam War. Lewy argues:

It is the reasoned conclusion of this study ... that the sense of guilt created by the Vietnam war in the minds of many Americans is not warranted and that the charges of officially, condoned illegal and grossly immoral conduct are without substance. Indeed, detailed examination of battlefield practices reveals that the loss civilian life in Vietnam was less great than in World War II and Korea and that concern with minimizing the ravages of the war was strong. To measure and compare the devastation and loss of human life caused by different war will be objectionable to those who repudiate all resort to military force as an instrument of foreign policy and may be construed as callousness. Yet as long as wars do take place at all it remains a moral duty to seek to reduce the agony caused by war, and the fulfillment of this obligation should not be disdained. I hope that this book may help demonstrate that moral convictions are not the exclusive possession of persons in conscience opposed to war, and that those who in certain circumstances accept the necessity and ethical justification of armed conflict also do care about human suffering.

The text was praised by US Senator Jim Webb, a Vietnam veteran then of the House Committee on Veteran's Affairs staff, and by several periodicals, including The Economist, which described it as "in many way the best history of the war yet to appear".

Lewy contends that the Vietnam War was legal and not immoral. In recalling the 1971 congressional testimony of some US veterans who were critical of the war, one of whom compared US action in Vietnam to genocide, Lewy suggests that some "witnesses sounded as if they had memorized North Vietnamese propaganda." The book is broadly critical of domestic opponents of American participation in the Vietnam War. In using the phrases "peace activists" or "peace demonstrations", Lewy often puts quotation marks around the word "peace", implying alternative motivations for the activism. The author suggests there may be a connection between cases of sabotage in the Navy and the anti-war movement:

Between 1965 and 1970, the Navy experienced a growing number of cases of sabotage and arson on its ships, but no evidence could be found that antiwar activists had directly participated in a sabotage attempt on a Navy vessel. Cases of fragging and avoidance of combat may well have been instigated at times by antiwar militants, though no hard evidence of organized subversion was ever discovered.

=== Noam Chomsky ===
Lewy criticized Noam Chomsky in the book for his role in proliferating charges of American war crimes through the aegis of the Committee of Concerned Asia Scholars, which Lewy characterizes as part of a "veritable industry" of war crimes allegations. Chomsky replied to the criticism with an article entitled "On the Aggression of South Vietnamese Peasants against the United States", in which he suggests that "Lewy is not writing just military history but a moral tract." He said:

In discussing the treatment of prisoners, Lewy shows his reasonableness by acknowledging "several cases of US maltreatment and torture." These are treated with antiseptic brevity, and Lewy takes pains to put them into a context of the "frustration resulting from fighting an often unseen enemy, the resentments created by casualties," etc. In dealing with Communist inhumaneness, however, he gives a plenitude of detail, with an unconcealed moral indignation totally absent from his grudging admission of US-Saigon torture, and factors that might explain such acts by the enemy are treated with sarcasm. He even matter-of-factly explains Saigon torture: "The police were not highly professional, prison guards were underpaid, and South Vietnamese have a low regard for human life."

=== "Revisionism" ===
America in Vietnam has frequently been assailed as a "revisionist" text. The book has been referred to as "a classic revisionist interpretation of the war", "the first and most impressive of the revisionist accounts" of the Vietnam war, and "one of the earliest and most sophisticated of revisionist works".

In the text itself, Lewy asserts that he is attempting to "clear away the cobwebs of mythology that inhibit the correct understanding of what went on -- and what went wrong -- in Vietnam."

=== Adherents ===
Among adherents of the text, Mark Moyar wrote in his 2006 Triumph Forsaken that "Lewy's superb book was the best history of the Vietnam War when it was first published, and ... remains one of the best." Moyar has himself contended that the orthodox histories of the Vietnam War incorrectly assert that it was unjust, unnecessary, and unwinnable. The political group Swift Boat Veterans for Truth utilized some of Lewy's work in their 2004 publication Unfit for Command, and Norman Podhoretz has often cited America in Vietnam and written extensively in its defense.

In one text, Podhoretz took aim at those who were attacking Lewy's conception of immorality as illegality in the context of war. "The task Lewy sets for himself turns out to be surprisingly simple, for the laws of war are so vaguely stated and so radically incomplete that a brief for the defense is readily put together", asserted Michael Walzer; of America in Vietnam, Theodore Draper added, "It is a continuing shame ... that the shamefulness of this war should be incidentally taken up in a book designed to cover up the shame by taking refuge in narrow and dubious legalisms." The wide-held belief that the Vietnam War represented "a dramatic collapse of both reason and morality" or that it was marked by "immoral conduct" was answered by Lewy and defended by Podhoretz:

"The American way of war," as it came to be called in the polemics of the period, was based on the motto "Expend Shells Not Men." Was it immoral of American commanders to follow this rule? The antiwar movement thought so, and Lewy's critics still do.

Podhoretz suggests that the struggle against communism is linked to the struggle against Nazism, because each represents totalitarianism. The domino theory was, in Podhoretz's eyes, vindicated by the U.S. withdrawal from Vietnam, rather than being discredited. Of Podhoretz's Why We Were in Vietnam, one critic asserted that "Time and again the footnote for a crucial argument directs the reader to Guenter Lewy's America in Vietnam, a book whose historical objectivity, to put it mildly, is not accepted by all sides."

=== "Is American Guilt Justified?" ===
One way that Guenter Lewy answered his critics was in an essay entitled "Is American Guilt Justified?" In the essay he suggests that many Americans feels a sense of guilt for having undertaken the Vietnam War, but that "the American sense of guilt is not warranted by the facts about the war which we know today.":

Some of my critics have painted me as a kind of moral leper, comparing me to those who deny that the Jewish Holocaust happened, that six million Jews were murdered during the Holocaust. Others say my work is a revisionist job, useful, perhaps, in stimulating debate, but otherwise too extreme to be considered reliable. Of course, I disagree with those appraisals.

Lewy describes his conception of legality and morality in the context of war, suggesting that what is legal must necessarily be moral as well: "Because I show that American military tactics are legal, I clearly also undermine [my critics'] assertion that the American conduct in Vietnam was immoral." He suggests also that "immoral conduct must involve immoral intentions", which he believes differentiates the "free-fire zones" in Vietnam from the "terror bombing of civilian populations during World War II".

Restating some of his arguments from America in Vietnam, Lewy asserts that the war in Vietnam does not constitute genocide for a number of reasons, including lack of genocidal intent and "results":

According to statistics developed by the United Nations, the population of South and North Vietnam, during the course of the war, increased at a rate roughly double that of the United States in a comparable period. That alone makes the charge of genocide--i.e., intentional destruction of a whole people--rather grotesque.

==== Winter Soldier Investigation ====
America in Vietnam, which appeared seven years after the Winter Soldier Investigation, became controversial in the context of the 2004 US presidential election. Presidential hopeful John Kerry had been involved with the Winter Soldier Investigation; in the context of the campaign, Lewy's suggestion that the Winter Soldier Investigation was dishonest and politically motivated was frequently cited to impugn John Kerry's reputation.

Vietnam Veterans Against the War, the group of which Kerry had been a part, alleged that American troops had committed atrocities in Vietnam. Lewy suggests that the group used "fake witnesses" in the Winter Soldier hearing in Detroit, and that its allegations were formally investigated:

The results of the investigation, carried out by the Naval Investigative Service, are interesting and revealing. Many of the veterans, though assured that they would not be questioned about the atrocities they might have committed personally, refused to be interviewed. One of the active members of the VVAW told investigators that the leadership had directed the entire membership not to cooperate with military authorities. A black marine who agreed to be interviewed was unable to provide details of the outrages he had described at the hearing, but he called the Vietnam war "one huge atrocity" and "a racist plot." He admitted that the question of atrocities had not occurred to him while he was in Vietnam, and that he had been assisted in the preparation of his testimony by a member of the Nation of Islam. But the most damaging finding consisted of the sworn statements of several veterans, corroborated by witnesses, that they had in fact not attended the hearing in Detroit. One of them had never been to Detroit in all his life. He did not know, he stated, who might have used his name.

Government officials today have no record of any such Naval Investigative Service report, although they suggest that it could have been lost or destroyed. Lewy later said that he could not recall if he had actually seen the alleged report or simply been told of its contents.
