= Monocle (satirical magazine) =

American satirical magazine

- Editor: C.D.B. Bryan (1961–1965)
- Categories: Satirical magazine
- Frequency: leisurely monthly
- Founder: Victor Navasky
- Founded: 1956
- Final issue: 1965
- Country: USA
- Based in: New Haven, New York City
- Language: English

Monocle was an American satirical magazine, published irregularly from the late 1950s until the mid-1960s. Co-founder Victor Navasky served as its first editor. From 1961 to 1965, it was edited by C. D. B. Bryan. Calvin Trillin, Dan Wakefield, Neil Postman, Richard Lingeman, Dan Greenburg, and humorist Marvin Kitman also contributed.

Monocle was founded by a group of Yale Law School students, including Navasky, as a "leisurely quarterly" (issued, in fact, twice a year). After graduation, they moved to New York City, where the magazine, in its editors' words, initially "operated more or less like the UN police force — we came out whenever there was an emergency". Later, it became a "leisurely monthly", with the intent of appearing about ten times a year.

Navasky recounts in detail the history of his founding and direction of Monocle in his 2005 memoir, A Matter of Opinion.

== The Monocle Peep Show ==
An anthology of material from the magazine, titled The Monocle Peep Show, was published in 1965. The anthology's chapter headings give a sense of both the magazine's subject matter and its politically irreverent tone. The book is divided into "Black and White Journalism" (on race in America), "Yellow Journalism" (on East Asia, including the Vietnam War), "Red Journalism" (on communism and the Cold War), "Off-color Journalism" (two pieces, one about a not-so-ex-Nazi rocket scientist and the other about someone campaigning for the papacy), and "Red, White & Blue Journalism", on American electoral politics. The "Black and White Journalism" chapter includes, among other things, a piece by African American comedian Godfrey Cambridge called "My Taxi Problem and Ours" — the title alludes to Norman Podhoretz's then-recent essay "My Negro Problem—And Ours" — a superhero comic called "Captain Melanin", and a piece called "We're Not Prejudiced But..." containing a series of one-liners such as "Do Negro Catholic couples have an innate sense of rhythm?" and "Did Gov. George Wallace come within a backlash of winning the Wisconsin primary?"

== Notes and references ==
- The Monocle Peep Show, Bantam Books (1965 paperback)
