= Bibliography of the Vietnam War =

This is a bibliography of works on the Vietnam War.

The bibliography aims to include primary, secondary and tertiary sources. Additionally, the scope of the bibliography expands to the causes of the Vietnam War and the immediate aftermath, such as evacuation and expulsion and war crimes trials. Works on the causes or the aftermath of the Vietnam War should only be included if they describe the respective events in the specific context of and relation to the conflict itself.

There are thousands of books written about the Vietnam War; therefore, this is not an all-inclusive list. This bibliography also does not aim to include fictional works (see List of Vietnam War films). It does not aim to include self-published works, unless there is a very good reason to do so.

== Bibliography ==
- Allen, George W. (2001). None So Blind: A Personal Account of the Intelligence Failure in Vietnam. Chicago: Ivan R. Dee.
- Appy, Christian G. (2006). Vietnam: The Definitive Oral History, Told from All Sides. London: Ebury Press. ISBN 978-0-09-191011-2.
- Asselin, Pierre (2024). Vietnam's American War: A New History. Cambridge University Press. ISBN 9781009229302.
- Baker, Kevin. "Stabbed in the Back! The past and future of a right-wing myth", Harper's Magazine (June 2006) "Stabbed in the back! The past and future of a right-wing myth (Harper's Magazine)". Archived from the original on 19 October 2012.
- Beattie, Keith (1998). The Scar That Binds: American Culture and the Vietnam War. New York University Press. ISBN 9780814786109.
- Berman, Larry (1989). Lyndon Johnson's War: The Road to Stalemate in Vietnam. New York: W. W. Norton & Company. ISBN 978-0-393-02636-8.
- Blaufarb, Douglas S. (1977). The Counterinsurgency Era: U.S. Doctrine and Performance, 1950 to the Present. New York: Free Press. ISBN 978-0-02-903700-3.
- Blaufarb Douglas S. The Counterinsurgency Era (1977). A history of the Kennedy Administration's involvement in South Vietnam.
- Brigham, Robert K. Battlefield Vietnam: A Brief History. A PBS interactive website.
- Brocheux, Pierre (2007). Ho Chi Minh: a biography. Cambridge University Press. p. 198. ISBN 978-0-521-85062-9.
- Buckley, Kevin (19 June 1972). "Pacification's Deadly Price". Newsweek.
- Carney, Timothy (1989). "The Unexpected Victory". In Karl D. Jackson (ed.). Cambodia, 1975–1978: Rendezvous with Death. Princeton, NJ: Princeton University Press. pp. 13–35. ISBN 978-0-691-07807-6.
- Church, Peter, ed. (2006). A Short History of South-East Asia. Wiley. ISBN 978-0-470-82181-7.
- Cooper, Chester L. (1970). The Lost Crusade: America in Vietnam. Dodd, Mead. ISBN 978-0-396-06241-7. a Washington insider's memoir of events.
- Courtwright, David T. (2005). Sky as Frontier: Adventure, Aviation, and Empire. College Station: Texas A&M University Press. ISBN 978-1-58544-384-0.
- Crump, Laurien (2015). The Warsaw Pact Reconsidered: International Relations in Eastern Europe, 1955–1969. Oxon: Routledge. ISBN 978-1-315-73254-1.
- Dennis, Peter; et al. (2008). The Oxford Companion to Australian Military History (2nd ed.). Melbourne: Oxford University Press Australia & New Zealand. ISBN 978-0-19-551784-2.
- DoD (6 November 1998). "Name of Technical Sergeant Richard B. Fitzgibbon to be added to the Vietnam Veterans Memorial". Department of Defense (DoD). Archived from the original on 20 October 2013.
- Dror, Olga (2018). Making Two Vietnams: War and Youth Identities, 1965–1975. Cambridge University Press. ISBN 9781108556163.
- Duiker, William J. (1981). The Communist Road to Power in Vietnam. Westview Press. ISBN 978-0-89158-794-1.
- Duncanson, Dennis J. (1968). Government and Revolution in Vietnam. Oxford University Press. OCLC 411221.
- Elliott, David (2003). The Vietnamese War: Revolution and Social Change in the Mekong Delta, 1930–1975. Armonk, NY: M.E. Sharpe.
- Etcheson, Craig (2005). After the Killing Fields: Lessons from the Cambodian Genocide. New York: Praeger. ISBN 978-0-275-98513-4.
- Kaiser, David E. (2000). American Tragedy: Kennedy, Johnson, and the Origins of the Vietnam War. Belknap Press of Harvard University Press. ISBN 978-0674006720.
- Fall, Bernard B. (1967). The Two Viet-Nams: A Political and Military Analysis (2nd ed.). New York: Praeger. ISBN 978-0-9991417-9-3.
- Fincher, Ernest Barksdale (1980). The Vietnam War.
- Ford, Harold P. (1998). CIA and the Vietnam Policymakers: Three Episodes, 1962–1968. OCLC 39333058.
- Gerdes, Louise I., ed. (2005). Examining Issues Through Political Cartoons: The Vietnam War. Greenhaven Press. ISBN 978-0-7377-2531-5.
- Gettleman, Marvin E.; Franklin, Jane; Young, Marilyn (1995). Vietnam and America: A Documented History.
- Greiner, Bernd (2010). War Without Fronts: The USA in Vietnam. London: Vintage Books. ISBN 978-0-09-953259-0.
- Hallin, Daniel C. (1986). The "Uncensored War": The Media and Vietnam. New York: Oxford University Press.
- Healy, Gene (2009). The Cult of the Presidency: America's Dangerous Devotion to Executive Power. Cato Institute. ISBN 978-1-933995-19-9.
- Herring, George C. (2001). America's Longest War: The United States and Vietnam, 1950–1975 (4th ed.). New York: McGraw-Hill. ISBN 978-0-07-253618-8.
- Hitchens, Christopher. The Vietnam Syndrome.
- Isaacs, Arnold (1983). Without Honor: Defeat in Vietnam and Cambodia. Baltimore: Johns Hopkins University Press.
- Kelly, Michael P. (2002). Where We Were in Vietnam. Oregon: Hellgate Press. ISBN 978-1-55571-625-7.
- Khong, Yuen Foong (1992). Analogies at War: Korea, Munich, Dien Bien Phu, and the Vietnam Decisions of 1965. Princeton University Press. ISBN 978-0-691-07846-5.
- Kiernan, Ben (2008). The Pol Pot Regime: Race, Power, and Genocide in Cambodia Under the Khmer Rouge (3rd ed.). New Haven, CN: Yale University Press. ISBN 978-0-300-14434-5.
- ———; Owen, Taylor (14 June 2024). "Bombs over Cambodia" (PDF). The Walrus (October 2006): 62–69.
- Kolko, Gabriel (1985). Anatomy of a War: Vietnam, the United States, and the Modern Historical Experience. New York: Pantheon Books. ISBN 978-0-394-74761-3.
- Kort, Michael G. (2017). The Vietnam War Reexamined. Cambridge University Press. ISBN 9781107110199.
- Kutler, Stanley I., ed. (1996). Encyclopedia of the Vietnam War. New York: Charles Scribner's Sons. ISBN 978-0-13-276932-7.
- Lawrence, A.T. (2009). Crucible Vietnam: Memoir of an Infantry Lieutenant. Jefferson, NC: McFarland. ISBN 978-0-7864-4517-2.
- Lawrence, Mark Atwood (2008). The Vietnam War: A Concise International History. Oxford University Press. ISBN 978-0-19-531465-6.
- Lewy, Guenter (1978). America in Vietnam. New York: Oxford University Press. ISBN 978-0-19-502732-7.
- Logevall, Fredrik (2001). The Origins of the Vietnam War. Harlow: Longman. ISBN 978-0-582-31918-9.
- ——— (2010). "The Indochina wars and the Cold War, 1945–1975". In Melvyn P. Leffler; Odd Arne Westad (eds.). The Cambridge History of the Cold War, Volume II: Crises and Détente. Cambridge: Cambridge University Press. pp. 281–304. ISBN 978-0-521-83720-0.
- McGibbon, Ian; ed (2000). The Oxford Companion to New Zealand Military History. Auckland: Oxford University Press. ISBN 978-0-19-558376-2.
- McMahon, Robert J. (1995). Major Problems in the History of the Vietnam War: Documents and Essays.
- McNeill, Ian (1993). To Long Tan: The Australian Army and the Vietnam War 1950–1966. St Leonards: Allen & Unwin. ISBN 978-1-86373-282-6.
- Menand, Louis, "How to Lose a War: Getting out of Vietnam was harder than getting in. Is there a lesson here?" (review of Elisa Tamarkin, Done in a Day: Telex from the Fall of Saigon, Chicago), The New Yorker, 20 April 2026, pp. 56–61.
- Miller, Edward (2013). Misalliance: Ngo Dinh Diem, the United States, and the Fate of South Vietnam. Harvard University Press. ISBN 9780674072985.
- Milne, David (2008). America's Rasputin: Walt Rostow and the Vietnam War. New York: Hill & Wang. ISBN 978-0-374-10386-6.
- Moïse, Edwin E. (2019). Tonkin Gulf and the Escalation of the Vietnam War (revised ed.). Annapolis: Naval Institute Press. ISBN 978-1-68247-424-2.
- ——— (2002). Historical Dictionary of the Vietnam War. Lanham, MD: Scarecrow Press. ISBN 978-0-8108-4183-3.
- Moss, George D. (2002). Vietnam (4th ed.). textbook.
- Moyar, Mark (2006). Triumph Forsaken: The Vietnam War, 1954–1965. New York: Cambridge University Press. ISBN 978-0-521-86911-9.
- Neale, Jonathan (2001). The American War: Vietnam, 1960–1975. London: Bookmarks. ISBN 978-1-898876-67-0.
- Neel, Spurgeon (1991). Medical Support of the U.S. Army in Vietnam 1965–1970. Department of the Army. official medical history
- Nelson, Deborah (2008). The War Behind Me: Vietnam Veterans Confront the Truth about U.S. War Crimes. Philadelphia, PA: Basic Books. ISBN 978-0-465-00527-7.
- Newman, John M. (1992). JFK and Vietnam: Deception, Intrigue, and the Struggle for Power. Warner Books. ISBN 978-0446516785.
- Nguyen, Duy Lap (2020). The Unimagined Community: Imperialism and Culture in South Vietnam. Manchester University Press. ISBN 978-1-5261-4396-9.
- Nguyen, Phi-Van (2024). A Displaced Nation: The 1954 Evacuation and Its Political Impact on the Vietnam Wars. Cornell University Press. ISBN 9781501778612.
- Oberdorfer, Don (2001) [1971]. Tet! The Turning Point in the Vietnam War. Baltimore, MD: Johns Hopkins University Press. ISBN 978-0-8018-6703-3.
- Obermeyer, Ziad; Murray, Christopher J.L.; Gakidou, Emmanuela (2008). "Fifty years of violent war deaths from Vietnam to Bosnia: analysis of data from the world health survey programme". BMJ. 336 (7659): 1482–1486. doi:10.1136/bmj.a137. PMC 2440905. PMID 18566045.
- Palmer, Bruce Jr. (1984). The Twenty-Five Year War. Narrative military history by a senior U.S. general.
- Palmer, Dave R. (1978). Summons of Trumpet: U.S.–Vietnam in Perspective. Novato, CA: Presidio Press. ISBN 978-0-89141-550-3.
- Race, Jeffrey (2010). War Comes to Long An: Revolutionary Conflict in a Vietnamese Province. Berkeley, CA: University of California Press.
- Robbins, Mary Susannah (2007). Against the Vietnam War: Writings by Activists. Lanham, MD: Rowman & Littlefield Publishers. ISBN 978-0-7425-5914-1.
- Roberts III, Mervyn Edwin (2018). The Psychological War for Vietnam, 1960–1968.
- Schandler, Herbert Y. (2009). America in Vietnam: The War That Couldn't Be Won. Lanham, MD: Rowman & Littlefield. ISBN 978-0-7425-6697-2.
- Schell, Jonathan. The Time of Illusion (1976).
- Schulzinger, Robert D. A Time for War: The United States and Vietnam, 1941–1975 (1997).
- Sheehan, Neil (1989). A Bright Shining Lie: John Paul Vann and America in Vietnam. New York: Vintage. ISBN 978-0-679-72414-8.
- Sorley, Lewis, A Better War: The Unexamined Victories and Final Tragedy of America's Last Years in Vietnam (1999), based upon still classified tape-recorded meetings of top level US commanders in Vietnam, ISBN 0-15-601309-6
- Spector, Ronald. After Tet: The Bloodiest Year in Vietnam (1992), very broad coverage of 1968.
- Stanton, Shelby L. (2003). Vietnam order of battle. Stackpole Books. ISBN 978-0-8117-0071-9.
- Stuart-Fox, Martin (1997). A History of Laos. Cambridge: Cambridge University Press. ISBN 978-0-521-59235-2.
- Summers, Harry G. On Strategy: A Critical Analysis of the Vietnam War, Presidio press (1982), ISBN 0-89141-563-7 (225 pages)
- Thayer, Thomas C. (1985). War Without Fronts: The American Experience in Vietnam. Boulder, CO: Westview Press. ISBN 978-0-8133-7132-0.
- Tucker, Spencer. ed. Encyclopedia of the Vietnam War (1998) 3 vol. reference set; also one-volume abridgement (2001).
- ——— (1999). Vietnam. London: UCL Press. ISBN 978-1-85728-921-3.
- Tran, Nu-Anh (2022). Disunion: Anticommunist Nationalism and the Making of the Republic of Vietnam. University of Hawaiʻi Press. ISBN 9780824887865.
- Tucker, Spencer (2011) [1998]. The Encyclopedia of the Vietnam War: A Political, Social, and Military History. ABC-CLIO. ISBN 978-1-85109-960-3.
- Turner, Robert F. (1975). Vietnamese Communism: Its Origins and Development. Stanford, CA: Hoover Institution Press. ISBN 978-0-8179-6431-3.
- Turse, Nick (2013). Kill Anything That Moves: The Real American War in Vietnam. New York: Metropolitan Books. ISBN 978-0-8050-8691-1.
- Veith, George J. (2012). Black April: The Fall of South Vietnam, 1973-75. New York: Encounter Books.
- Young, Marilyn B. (1991). The Vietnam Wars, 1945–1990. New York: HarperPerennial. ISBN 978-0-06-092107-1.
- Miller, Edward, ed. (2024). The Cambridge History of the Vietnam War, Volume I: Origins. Cambridge University Press. ISBN 9781316225240.
- Preston, Andrew, ed. (2024). The Cambridge History of the Vietnam War, Volume II: Escalation and Stalemate. Cambridge University Press. ISBN 9781316225264.
- Asselin, Pierre, ed. (2024). The Cambridge History of the Vietnam War, Volume III: Endings and Aftermaths. Cambridge University Press. ISBN 9781316225288.
