= Rachel Abrams =

American writer, editor, and artist

- Abrams in 1981
- Born: Rachel Decter; 2 January 1951
- Died: 7 June 2013 (aged 62); Great Falls, Virginia, U.S.
- Spouse: Elliott Abrams (m. 1980)
- Parents: Moshe Decter (father); Midge Decter (mother)

Rachel Abrams (née Decter; January 2, 1951 – June 7, 2013) was an American writer, editor, sculptor, and artist. She was the daughter of Moshe Decter and Midge Decter and wife of Elliott Abrams.

== Career ==
She was a visual artist and sculptor, and her writing appeared in several publications including The Wall Street Journal, The Weekly Standard and Commentary, which was edited first by Abrams' stepfather, Norman Podhoretz, and later her half brother (both were children of Midge Decter), John Podhoretz.

Abrams was a board member of the Emergency Committee for Israel. A critic of liberal thinkers, she kept a politically oriented blog called Bad Rachel. In the 1970s, she spent three years working on Kibbutz Machanayim in the Galilee.Of the Palestinians who kidnapped Gilad Shalit, Abrams wrote:

... the slaughtering, death-worshiping, innocent-butchering, child-sacrificing savages who dip their hands in blood and use women — those who aren't strapping bombs to their own devils' spawn and sending them out to meet their seventy-two virgins by taking the lives of the school-bus-riding, heart-drawing, Transformer-doodling, homework-losing children of Others — and their offspring — those who haven't already been pimped out by their mothers to the murder god — as shields, hiding behind their burkas and cradles like the unmanned animals they are, and throw them not into your prisons, where they can bide until they're traded by the thousands for another child of Israel, but into the sea, to float there, food for sharks, stargazers, and whatever other oceanic carnivores God has put there for the purpose.

In 1987, Abrams stated that she "would like to take a machine gun and mow Anthony Lewis down" after Lewis, a journalist, called her husband a "coward" and criticized him for whitewashing human rights abuses.

== Death ==
Rachel Abrams died on June 7, 2013, at the age of 62. She had been battling stomach cancer for three years. She was survived by her husband, Elliott Abrams, and their three children.
