= ECIL =

ECIL may refer to:

- Electronics Corporation of India Limited
- Emergency Committee for Israel's Leadership
