= John Podhoretz =

American writer (born 1961)

- Born: John Mordecai Podhoretz; 1961 (age 64–65); New York City, U.S.
- Education: University of Chicago (BA)
- Occupations: Author, columnist, pundit, film critic
- Spouses: Elisabeth Marie Hickey (m. 1997; div. 1997) Ayala Rae Cohen (m. 2002)
- Children: 3
- Parents: Norman Podhoretz (father); Midge Decter (mother)
- Relatives: Ruthie Blum (sister); Rachel Abrams (half-sister)

John Mordecai Podhoretz (/pɒdˈhɒrɛts/; born 1961) is an American journalist and conservative political commentator. The son of writers Norman Podhoretz and Midge Decter, he has been the editor of the magazine Commentary since 2009, a post his father held for over 30 years. Before that, Podhoretz ran the editorial page of the New York Post, was a deputy editor of The Weekly Standard, and contributed to numerous other publications. He served as a speechwriter for President Ronald Reagan, worked in the George H. W. Bush administration, and has authored several books on politics.

== Early life and education ==
Podhoretz was born in 1961, to a Jewish family in Manhattan, New York City, the son of conservative journalists Norman Podhoretz and Midge Decter. He has two older half-siblings from his mother's first marriage. He grew up on Manhattan's Upper West Side. He attended Columbia Grammar and Preparatory School and received a bachelor's degree from the University of Chicago in 1982. In 1987, he became a five-time champion on the game show Jeopardy!.

== Career ==
Podhoretz was a speechwriter for former U.S. Presidents Ronald Reagan and George H. W. Bush. He was special assistant to White House Drug Czar William Bennett. He co-founded the White House Writers Group, a public-relations firm in Washington, D.C. Podhoretz was a consultant for the popular television series The West Wing, including the season five episode "Gaza", first broadcast on May 12, 2004.

Podhoretz has contributed to a number of conservative publications, including National Review and the Weekly Standard, where he was a movie critic and the magazine's deputy editor. He was also a consulting editor at ReganBooks, a former imprint of HarperCollins. In 1997, Podhoretz began leading the editorial section of New York Post. He kept a regular column there afterward. He has appeared on television, including Fox News, CNN's Reliable Sources, MS NOW, and The McLaughlin Group (in the chair usually occupied by conservative Tony Blankley). He also worked at Time, The Washington Times, Insight on the News, and U.S. News & World Report. Podhoretz was a contributor to The Corner, a group blog run by National Review.

At The Weekly Standard, one staff member said Podhoretz's "arrogance and egotism had a psychological effect people can't quite believe". A Washington Times colleague said Podhoretz was "permanently frozen in juvenilia". Glenn Garvin, the Central American bureau chief of the Miami Herald, once said that at the Times, Podhoretz "constantly complained that his brilliance wasn't appreciated".

On January 1, 2009, Podhoretz became editor of Commentary, succeeding Neal Kozodoy.

=== Political commentary ===
==== George W. Bush ====
Podhoretz was a staunch supporter of President George W. Bush. His 2004 book Bush Country: How George W. Bush Became the First Great Leader of the 21st Century---While Driving Liberals Insane called Bush "the first great leader of the 21st century". When some conservatives denounced Bush's immigration plan, Podhoretz wrote that Bush's "efforts on behalf of conservative causes—from faith-based policies to stem-cell research to a strict-constructionist judiciary to entitlement reform and massive tax cuts—have all fallen down the memory hole".

==== Israel ====
Podhoretz is emphatic in his defense of Israel in its conflicts with its Arab neighbors. When pundit Pat Buchanan called Israel's actions in the 2006 Lebanon War "un-Christian", Podhoretz wrote: "You want to know what anti-Semitism is? When Pat Buchanan calls Israel's military action 'un-Christian.' That's anti-Semitism."

==== Iraq War ====
Podhoretz has supported the Iraq War from its inception until its conclusion. In a July 25, 2006, New York Post column about the Israel-Lebanon conflict, he advocated a more Machiavellian policy in Iraq, writing: "What if the tactical mistake we made in Iraq was that we didn't kill enough Sunnis in the early going to intimidate them and make them so afraid of us they would go along with anything? Wasn't the survival of Sunni men between the ages of 15 and 35 the reason there was an insurgency and the basic cause of the sectarian violence now?" In a December 2006 column, he wrote, "The most common cliché about the war in Iraq is now this: We didn't have a plan, and now everything is in chaos... This is entirely wrong. We did have a plan—the problem is that the plan didn't work... We thought a political process inside Iraq would make a military push toward victory against a tripartite foe—Saddamist remnants, foreign terrorists and anti-American Shiites—unnecessary... The only plan that will work is a plan to face the tripartite enemy—the Saddamists, the foreign terrorists and the Shiite sectarians—and bring them to heel. Kill as many bad guys as we can, with as many troops as we can muster."

==== Immigration ====
In disagreement with several writers at National Review and conservatives in general, Podhoretz has aggressively favored a more open immigration policy for the United States. He wrote: "I said merely what I feel deeply—which is that, as a Jew, I have great difficulty supporting a blanket policy of immigration restriction because of what happened to the Jewish people after 1924 and the unwillingness of the United States to take Jews in." Podhoretz was generally supportive of President Bush's proposals for a guest worker program and a path to citizenship for certain illegal immigrants in the U.S.

In November 2007 comments on Commentary's blog "Contentions", Podhoretz attacked his former National Review Online colleague Mark Krikorian for what Podhoretz called a "vision of a walled-off America primarily under threat from border-crossing immigrants." Podhoretz attempted to connect Krikorian's stance on immigration to an isolationist foreign policy. In response, Krikorian called Podhoretz a "pedantic bore" who had no "actual arguments" against Krikorian's position.

==== Jill Carroll incident ====
On March 30, 2006, Podhoretz was criticized by various bloggers for posting the following comment on National Review Online approximately three hours after hostage Jill Carroll's release from her captors: "It's wonderful that she's free, but after watching someone who was a hostage for three months say on television she was well-treated because she wasn't beaten or killed—while being dressed in the garb of a modest Muslim woman rather than the non-Muslim woman she actually is—I expect there will be some Stockholm syndrome talk in the coming days."

Within days of Carroll's release, a video of Carroll slamming the "occupation" of Iraq and praising the insurgents as "good people fighting an honorable fight" appeared on an Islamist website. Carroll subsequently released a statement through The Christian Science Monitor's website saying that she participated in the video only because she feared for her life and because her captors said they would let her go if she did so to their satisfaction. Carroll called her captors "criminals, at best" and said she remained "deeply angry" at them.

On April 1, 2006, Podhoretz wrote the following on National Review Online: "For writing these predictive words, which were entirely accurate, I've been pilloried all over the blogosphere. Weird, especially in light of Jill Carroll's statement today, which was an effort to address and quiet precisely the kind of talk I predicted would take place."

==== Conflicts with John Derbyshire ====
In response to assertions by National Review writer John Derbyshire that the victims of the Virginia Tech massacre should have defended themselves more forcefully, Podhoretz wrote: "The notion that a human being or group of human beings holding no weapon whatever should somehow 'fight back' against someone calmly executing other people right in front of their eyes is ludicrous beyond belief, irrational beyond bounds, and tasteless beyond the limits of reason. 'Why didn't anyone rush the guy?' Derb asks. Gee, I don't know. Because he was executing people? Because if you rush a guy with a gun, he shoots you in the head the way he executed the teachers in each classroom?" Podhoretz also ridiculed Derbyshire's claim that he was touching a "third rail" by raising a subject nobody else wanted to discuss.

Podhoretz has frequently clashed with Derbyshire on immigration policy and other issues.

==== Other commentary ====
Podhoretz often writes about popular culture, and was called the "resident pop culture expert" at National Review Online by Jonah Goldberg. Dennis Miller has called Podhoretz his "favorite movie reviewer". Podhoretz has written, "it doesn't make sense to judge pop culture by its politics." His 1999 New York Post column "A Conversation in Hell", which featured a conversation between Satan and Joseph P. Kennedy Sr., was killed because of its controversial nature. Jonathan Chait has criticized Podhoretz's use of social media, saying he "spews forth abuse upon various adversaries, especially by lobbing spurious charges of antisemitism."

== Personal life ==
In May 1997, Podhoretz married Republican political aide Elisabeth Marie Hickey; the couple met only three months before their marriage, and divorced three months after their wedding. In 2002, he married Ayala Rae Cohen, a former co-producer for Saturday Night Live, who works for International Creative Management (ICM Partners). They have three children. Podhoretz's half-sister, Rachel Abrams, was married to the diplomat, lawyer, political scientist, and Iran-Contra convict Elliott Abrams.

== Books ==
External videos
- Booknotes interview with Podhoretz on Hell of a Ride, December 19, 1993, C-SPAN
- Presentation by Podhoretz on Bush Country, February 24, 2004, C-SPAN

- (1993) Hell of a Ride: Backstage at the White House Follies 1989–1993, New York: Simon & Schuster, ISBN 0-671-79648-8
- (1993) A Passion for Truth: The Selected Writings of Eric Breindel, New York: HarperCollins Publishers, editor ISBN 0-671-79648-8
- (2004) Bush Country: How Dubya Became a Great President While Driving Liberals Insane, New York: St. Martin's Press, ISBN 0-312-32473-1
- (2007) Can She Be Stopped?: Hillary Clinton Will Be the Next President of the United States Unless..., New York: Crown Forum, ISBN 0-307-33730-8
