= We Real Cool: Black Men and Masculinity =

2004 book by bell hooks

- Cover of the first edition
- Author: bell hooks
- Language: English
- Subject: Masculinity
- Publication date: 2004
- Publication place: United States
- Media type: Print
- ISBN: 0415969271

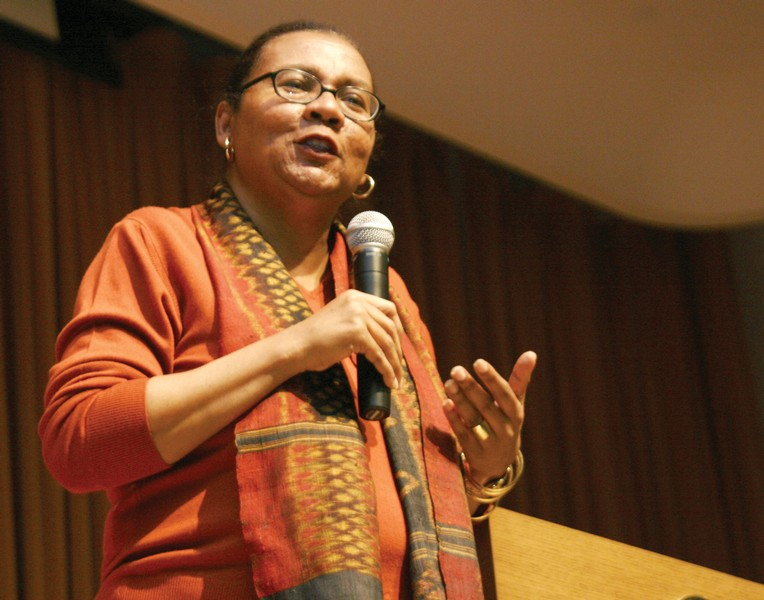
bell hooks in 2009

We Real Cool: Black Men and Masculinity is a 2004 book about masculinity by feminist author bell hooks. It collects ten essays on black men. The title alludes to Gwendolyn Brooks' 1959 poem "We Real Cool". The essays are intended to provide cultural criticism and solutions to the problems she identifies.

Hooks suggests that black men are forced to repress themselves in white America. She suggests the ways in which racist and sexist attitudes developed in American culture have criminalized and dehumanized black men, and the ways in which these myths have harmed the black community. Hooks states that she believes that hip-hop as a whole strongly reflects imperialist white supremacist capitalist patriarchy.

== Summary ==
"Preface about black men: don't believe the hype" addresses the public perception of black masculinity and its stereotypes. hooks opens by critiquing Ellis Cose's The Envy of the World: On Being a Black Man in America. She argues Cose limits his cultural analysis of race in America by refraining from discussing contemporary political issues, neglecting Malcolm X and W. E. B. Du Bois's theories of civil rights, and offering few means of subverting racial stereotypes and social issues. Black men suffer, in hooks' view, from what she terms imperialist white supremacist capitalist patriarchy. She writes: "Allegiance to sexist thinking about the nature of leadership creates a blind spot that effectively prevents masses of black people from making use of theories and practices of liberation when they are offered by women." hooks uses examples of her family life, specifically her father and brother, to document "patriarchal domination" of black male thought, and argues for radicalized intersectionality. "Anyone who claims to be concerned with the fate of black men in the United States," hooks writes, "who does not speak about the need for them to radicalize their consciousness to challenge patriarchy ... colludes with the existing system in keeping black men in their place, psychologically locked down, locked out."

"Plantation patriarchy" centers on African masculinity that predated the beginning of the Atlantic slave trade. Rather than subjugating indigenous people along racial lines, hooks claims African explorers of the Americas inherited patriarchal practices against women. She discusses gender relations under slavery and, while affirming Frederick Douglass's and Martin Delany's support of the equality of the sexes, argues black men in general held patriarchal attitudes toward their spouses: "[Freed male slaves] wanted black women to conform to the gender norms set by white society. They wanted to be recognized as ‘men,' as patriarchs, by other men, including white men. Yet they could not assume this position if black women were not willing to conform to prevailing sexist gender norms". hooks continues by arguing these problematic notions became the norm in black men from the early 20th century to the present day. To argue this point, hooks cites the discrepancies between Amy Jacques Garvey's activism and her husband Marcus's, and the scholarship of others who researched black gender roles in the United States. Some of it hooks found insightful, such as E. Franklin Frazier's The Negro Family in the United States, while others she found distasteful, such as Norman Podhoretz's My Negro Problem—And Ours. hooks criticizes the latter along with Daniel Patrick Moynihan's The Negro Family for positing black men were sexually more potent than white men, and/or emasculated by women for by their breadwinner status.

"Gangsta culture: a piece of the action" discusses economic barriers black men face in greater depth, focusing mainly on the 1960s. hooks argues that patriarchal notions of manhood have equated financial excess as the masculine ideal. As a result of this and a disdain for hierarchical power structures within the working economy black men turn to alternative professions: professional sports, music (jazz, blues, and hip-hop mostly) and crime. hooks cites Muhammad Ali as an influential figure in "assert[ing] a black male identity distinct from the stereotype" of silent, emotionless, and materialistic male leaders." At the same time hooks argues white supremacists have portrayed Ali as a "silent symbol of brute strength without an intelligent voice ... the eunuch who comes when his master speaks." To remedy this hooks calls for black communities to affirm the legacies of Ali, Malcolm X, and King Jr. to challenge equating wealth with masculine success and unemployment as failure, and to lessen the influence of film and television that, hooks argues, trains black youth to join violent street gangs.

The following chapter, titled "schooling black males" discusses a similar phenomenon with education. Black boys are discouraged from reading by the scarcity of books in many black families and communities, unspoken racial hierarchies in many public schooling, and traditional mass media. hooks uses the fictional character of Steve Urkel as an example of the emasculation that black boys face in the public sphere for showing a desire to become educated. To combat this phenomenon hooks argues in favor of mass literacy campaigns, homeschooling, private schooling and progressive education as tools to encourage education among black men and to subvert patriarchal notions of black masculinity.

"Don't make me hurt you: black male violence" evaluates the measure: black men are encouraged to commit acts of violence. hooks argues that depictions of African-Americans in films like The Shawshank Redemption and The Green Mile, as well as media portrayal of the O. J. Simpson murder trial racialize black men as examples of hyper-masculine violence, and again draws comparisons to the Civil Rights Movement. She argues opponents of civil rights would greatly benefit from armed resistance, as it would erode the platform of the movement and encourage white allies to erode from their ranks. At the same time hooks concedes that violence played a pivotal role in the advocacy of Stokely Carmichael and other black advocates. The problems with black violence, as she sees it, are that it echoes patriarchal, sexist messages of masculinity, it is often experienced within the family and between members of the same race, and that it is often the expression of a more insidious rage. "To end our cultural fascination with violence, and our imposition onto men in general and black men in particular ... we must choose a partnership model that posits interbeing as the principle around which to organize family and community."

Chapter 5 is titled "it's a dick thing: beyond sexual acting out". It discusses the inability of black men to claim a healthy sexuality throughout time. In slave society, black men were distorted as violent rapists, lynched and often castrated for supposed deviant sexual acts. As a consequence of this, black men were claimed to have an unmatched sexual prowess envied by whites. hooks argues these myths originate from whites' projection of torture, enslavement and rape of black men and women under slave society. To rebel against this, free black men and women attempted to reclaim erotic sexual love, but as hooks argues, succumbed to patriarchal notions of sexuality: namely, that sexual prowess equates to true manhood and that women were always penetrated during intercourse. Many black men who did not seek to challenge the stereotype of intense sexual prowess embraced it by romanticizing prostitution and pimping. hooks discusses misogyny in rap music, films like Sweet Sweetback's Baadasssss Song and the rape of young black boys as other examples of patriarchal black sexuality. Rape at the hands of adult male perpetrators or an adult female prostitute, scars children and objectifies black men. To combat this, hooks calls for a "new kind of sex" that "refuses to ground sexual acts in narratives of domination and submission" as well as promoting sexual healing therapy among the black community.

== Themes ==
This novel deals with themes surrounding the many societal challenges and pressures black men face in a patriarchal society. The book negotiates the nature of racial injustice, gender roles, and feminism throughout its chapters.

=== Masculinity ===
Layered throughout the novel is the idea of how a traditional "cool" black man is supposed to act. Typically, being "cool" refers to a black man's ability to withstand many trials and tribulations. They are expected to face all their challenges head on, as opposed to adopting a "poor me" mentality.

=== Patriarchy ===
The book discusses the typical societal view of how “traditional” black men and black women are supposed to act. This is evident in how the novel discusses how black men and women are expected to conform to “societal norms” if they are to be accepted and recognized in society.

== Reception ==
We Real Cool was received with mixed reviews upon initial release. Sarah Gold of Publishers Weekly commented that hooks was "a writer of extraordinary skill"., but one who "pads out her insights with lengthy quotations from many sources, which thin but don't fully dilute her revolutionary message of love." Vernon Ford of Booklist echoed concerns that hooks relied too heavily on feminist ideology. Nevertheless, his review was generally positive: " [Hook's] recollections of her own family experiences and growing up black in America reflect extraordinary insight into both our cultural frailties and our potential. Readers interested in black cultural issues from a feminist perspective will enjoy this book."

== See also ==
- Hegemonic masculinity
