= Victor Navasky =

American journalist (1932–2023)

- Born: Victor Saul Navasky; July 5, 1932; Manhattan, New York, U.S.
- Died: January 23, 2023 (aged 90); Manhattan, New York, U.S.
- Education: Swarthmore College (1954); Yale Law School (1959)
- Occupations: Journalist, editor, author
- Known for: Editor of The Nation; Author of Naming Names
- Spouse: Anne Strongin (m. 1966)
- Children: 3

Signature
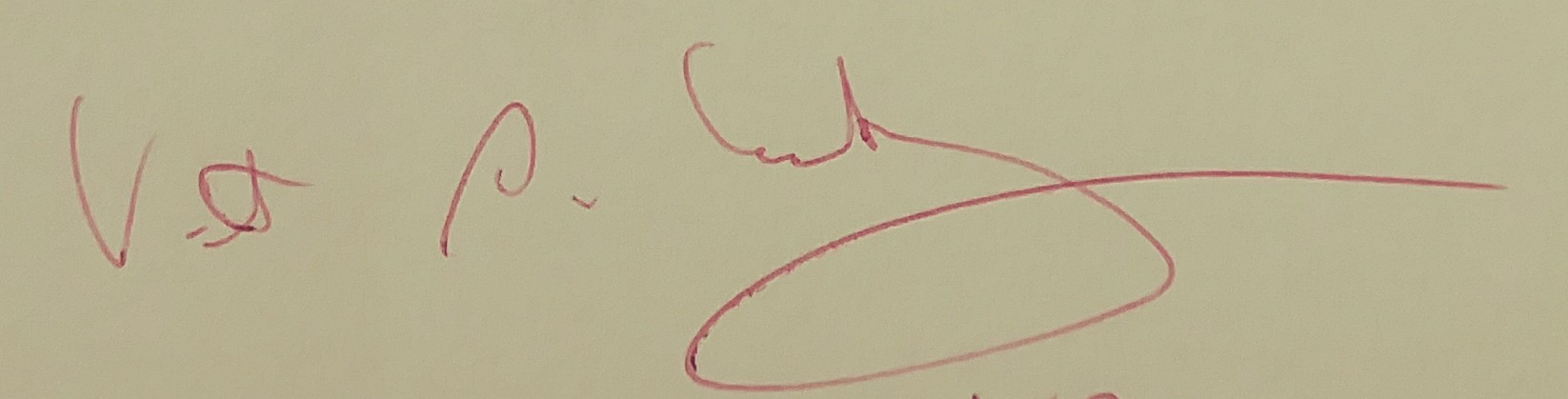

Victor Saul Navasky (July 5, 1932 – January 23, 2023) was an American journalist, editor, and author. From 1978 to 1995, he edited the progressive weekly magazine The Nation. From 1995 to 2005, he was the magazine's publisher and editorial director, before stepping down to become publisher emeritus. He then went on to direct the George T. Delacorte Center for Magazine Journalism at the Columbia University Graduate School of Journalism, and to chair the Columbia Journalism Review.

Navasky also authored several critically praised books, including Naming Names (1980), which is considered a definitive take on the Hollywood blacklist. Its paperback reprint won him a 1982 National Book Award for Nonfiction. (Note: From 1980 to 1983 in the National Book Awards for history, there were several nonfiction subcategories, including "General Nonfiction", that offered separate hardcover and paperback awards. Most of the paperback winners were reprints of prior hardbacks, as was the case with Naming Names.)

== Early life and education ==
Victor Saul Navasky was born in July 1932 on the Upper West Side of Manhattan, the son of Esther (Goldberg) and Macy Navasky. Macy ran a small clothing-manufacturing business in the Garment District. Victor attended grade school in Greenwich Village. In 1946, when he was in the eighth grade, he helped raise money for the Irgun Zvai Leumi — by passing a contribution basket at performances of Ben Hecht’s play, A Flag is Born. For high school, he attended the Little Red School House, which was founded on the progressive education principles of John Dewey.

Navasky was a graduate of Swarthmore College (1954) where he edited the student newspaper. He was elected to Phi Beta Kappa and received high honors in the social sciences. He then served in the United States Army from 1954 to 1956. He was stationed at Fort Richardson in Alaska and was briefly a military journalist. Following his discharge, he enrolled in Yale Law School on the G.I. Bill and received his LL.B. in 1959.

While at Yale Law, Navasky co-founded with Richard Lingeman a magazine of political satire called Monocle, which ran until 1965. Navasky recruited numerous contributors and illustrators for the magazine who went on to noteworthy careers. Nora Ephron, a Monocle contributor, remembered Navasky as a man "who knew important people, and he knew people he made you think were important simply because he knew them." Eventually, Navasky realized his greatest passion was for journalism, and he chose it as his profession ahead of law.

== Career ==
In 1970, Navasky was hired by The New York Times. He worked as a manuscript editor and staff writer for The New York Times Magazine and was a frequent book reviewer. He also wrote a New York Times Book Review monthly column, "In Cold Print", about the publishing business. After leaving The Times in 1974, he was awarded a Guggenheim fellowship. Starting in 1975, he was a visiting professor at Wesleyan University, a visiting scholar at the Russell Sage Foundation, and then a Ferris Visiting Professor of Journalism at Princeton University from 1976 to 1977.

In 1978, Navasky was named editor of America's oldest weekly magazine, The Nation. He held the position for many years and was immortalized in Calvin Trillin's "Uncivil Liberties" column as "the wily and parsimonious Victor S. Navasky" or "The W. & P." for short.

In one of his most controversial editorial stances, Navasky was a longtime defender of alleged Soviet spy Alger Hiss. Beginning with a critical review of Allen Weinstein's book Perjury: The Hiss-Chambers Case in an April 1978 issue of The Nation, Navasky maintained that Hiss's guilt had not been proven beyond a reasonable doubt. Kai Bird wrote, "Navasky quite simply thought Chambers made an unreliable witness. Navasky was not a Hiss believer but an agnostic. As late as 2007, he wrote in The Nation, 'This is a case that will not die. It will not go away. The Cold War is over but this, among other Cold War ghosts, lingers on.' For Victor, it was important and interesting to ask why."

Throughout his journalistic career, Navasky worked on various academic pursuits. He researched and wrote several non-fiction books of biography and history. In 1971, he published Kennedy Justice, described as "a scholarly account of the Justice Department under Attorney General Robert F. Kennedy". Columnist George F. Will wrote in the National Review, "This is probably the best book ever written on a Kennedy brother, and it may be the best book ever written on an executive department of the Federal Government." Kennedy Justice was a finalist for a National Book Award.

Navasky then embarked on an eight-year effort to study the Hollywood blacklist. In the course of his research, he pored through House Un-American Activities Committee testimony and interviewed over 150 actors, writers, directors, and producers. He paid particular attention to the role of informers, a topic he had become interested in while learning about a pivotal informer in Attorney General Kennedy's case against Jimmy Hoffa. The resulting book, Naming Names, was a huge critical success. Daniel Aaron praised Navasky's achievement in The New York Review of Books: "One can only applaud the adroitness with which he has put together a lucid and persuasive narrative from such a mare's nest of fact and supposition". The 1980 hardback was a finalist for a National Book Award in the General Nonfiction category, and the paperback reprint won the award in 1982.

In 1994, while on a year's leave of absence from The Nation, Navasky served as a fellow at the Institute of Politics at Harvard Kennedy School, and a senior fellow at the Freedom Forum Media Studies Center at Columbia University. Upon returning to The Nation in 1995, he led a group of investors (including Paul Newman and E.L. Doctorow) in a $1 million purchase of The Nation from Arthur L. Carter. Navasky then became the magazine's publisher and editorial director for the next ten years. To fulfill his expanded leadership duties at the magazine, Navasky sought to better educate himself in business fundamentals. To that end, he enrolled in the Owner/President Management (OPM) program at Harvard Business School, where he was remembered as an unlikely political progressive among mostly conservative classmates.

After winding down his responsibilities at The Nation, Navasky accepted a post as director of the George T. Delacorte Center for Magazine Journalism at Columbia University. He was also a member of the board of Independent Diplomat, and a regular commentator on the public radio program Marketplace. He served on the boards of the Authors Guild, International PEN, and the Committee to Protect Journalists.

In 2005, he was named chairman of the Columbia Journalism Review (CJR), which engendered controversy when Navasky's name was not listed on the magazine's masthead. This omission, critics on the political right claimed, hid the fact that—despite CJR's purported lack of political bias—a "major left-wing polemicist is calling the shots at CJR without any mention on the masthead."

In 2005, Navasky received the George Polk Book Award given annually by Long Island University to honor contributions to journalistic integrity and investigative reporting. In that same year, he published his memoir, A Matter of Opinion. In the book, he summarized his political views as follows:

I was, I guess, what would be called a left-liberal, although I never thought of myself as all that left. I believed in civil rights and civil liberties, I favored racial integration, I thought responsibility for the international tensions of the Cold War was equally distributed between the United States and the U.S.S.R.

In 2013, Navasky published his final book, The Art of Controversy: Political Cartoons and Their Enduring Power, which looked at the impact over the centuries of provocative political cartoons. In 2017, he was awarded the I.F. Stone Medal for Journalistic Independence by Harvard's Nieman Foundation. In 2020, Navasky was appointed to the board of Defending Rights & Dissent.

== Personal life and death ==
Navasky married Anne Strongin in 1966. They had three children.

Victor Navasky died in a Manhattan hospital on January 23, 2023. The cause of death was pneumonia. He was 90.

== Books ==
- The Monocle Peep Show. Bantam Books. 1965. LCCN 65008883. OCLC 6344674. Co-edited with Richard R. Lingeman.
- Kennedy Justice. Atheneum. 1971. LCCN 77145633. OCLC 462212821.
- Naming Names. Viking Press. 1980. ISBN 978-0670503933.
- The Experts Speak: The Definitive Compendium of Authoritative Misinformation. Pantheon Books. 1984. ISBN 978-0394713342. Co-authored with Christopher Cerf.
- The Best of The Nation: Selections from the Independent Magazine of Politics and Culture. Thunder's Mouth Press/Nation Books. 2000. ISBN 978-1560252672. Co-edited with Katrina vanden Heuvel.
- A Matter of Opinion. Farrar, Straus and Giroux. 2005. ISBN 978-0374299972.
- Mission Accomplished! (or How We Won the War in Iraq). Simon & Schuster. 2008. ISBN 978-1416569930. Co-authored with Christopher Cerf.
- The Art of Making Magazines: On Being an Editor and Other Views from the Industry. Columbia University Press. 2012. ISBN 978-0231131360. Co-edited with Evan Cornog.
- The Art of Controversy: Political Cartoons and Their Enduring Power. Knopf. 2013. ISBN 978-0307957207.

== Magazines ==
Navasky had a major influence on the following magazines:

- Monocle (co-founder, editor)
- The Nation (editor, later publisher)
- Columbia Journalism Review (chairman)
