= Committee for the Free World =

American think tank

The Committee for the Free World was a neoconservative anti-Communist think tank in the United States.

== Overview ==
It was founded in February 1981 with US$125,000 from the Scaife Foundations, the John M. Olin Foundation, and the Smith Richardson Foundation. Later, donors included Sears and Mobil Oil (now known as ExxonMobil).

Midge Decter served as the executive director of the committee. Other members included Jeane Kirkpatrick, Leszek Kołakowski, Irving Kristol, Melvin J. Lasky, Seymour M. Lipset, Donald Rumsfeld, Tom Stoppard, and George Will. Eugene V. Rostow, then serving as Director of the Arms Control and Disarmament Agency under President Ronald Reagan, was a speaker at a CFW event on Poland in 1982.

Given the number of members who were formerly involved with the Congress for Cultural Freedom, a CIA front organization, John S. Friedman has argued in The Nation that there are strong reasons to believe that the CFW continued the work of the CCF and still had ties to the CIA.

It was headquartered in New York City. It published a monthly newsletter, Contentions. It also helped conservative newspapers on college campuses develop and the National Association of Scholars. In 1989, both Decter and Democratic Senator Daniel P. Moynihan denied donating US$1 million to Indian Prime Minister Rajiv Gandhi through the organization.

It was discontinued shortly after the collapse of the Berlin Wall signaled the collapse of the Soviet Union.
