= Peg Mullen =

Antiwar activist

Margaret Ellen Mullen (née Goodyear; June 11, 1917 – October 2, 2009) was an American antiwar activist who was motivated to protest after her son was killed in Vietnam by shrapnel fired from friendly artillery in 1970. She became an active opponent of U.S. involvement in the Vietnam War and protested against the Gulf War and Iraq War. Her life story was made into the Emmy Award-winning 1979 film Friendly Fire starring Carol Burnett, which was based on a 1976 book of the same name by C. D. B. Bryan.

== Early life ==
Born in 1917 in Pocahontas, Iowa to Clair and Josephine (née Wolfe) Goodyear, Mullen attended Sacred Heart High School, moving to Des Moines after graduation. She was employed as a secretary in the United States Department of Labor from 1937 to 1944.

She married Oscar Eugene "Gene" Mullen in 1941 and lived on a family farm near La Porte City, Iowa, supplementing her income with jobs at J. C. Penney and Santa Claus Industries. The couple had five children: Michael, Daniel (who died two days after being born prematurely), Patricia, Mary Margaret, and John Kevin. Peg Mullen was an active Democrat who was a delegate to the Democratic National Conventions held in 1964, 1968 and 1972. In 1972 she was a McGovern delegate. That same year she was nominated for Iowa Mother of the Year.

== Son's death in Vietnam ==
Her son Michael was drafted in 1968, and she would later write of her fears of being "in a quiet corner of an airport and say[ing] goodbye to a son in uniform, knowing in your heart that you'll never see him again." He was killed on February 18, 1970, from shrapnel fired by U.S. artillery. She refused to believe the United States Army's description of the incident as an accident and remained skeptical even after evidence was provided to support the official story. Norman Schwarzkopf Jr. met with the Mullens in an unsuccessful attempt to address their questions, later writing in his autobiography It Doesn't Take a Hero of the double tragedy of "the needless death of a young man, and the bitterness that was consuming his parents."

With the death benefit she received from the military, Mullen purchased two half-page ads in The Des Moines Register, with the first ad featuring 714 crosses and the second with 719 to represent the number of Iowa residents killed during the war. Mullen refused a military funeral for her son, would not accept his medals, and rejected the standard grave marker offered for free by the military. Instead, she bought a tombstone that used the word "killed" (instead of "died") to describe the circumstances of his death. A letter of condolence from President of the United States Richard M. Nixon was sent back with her note reading "Send it to the next damn fool."

== Friendly Fire ==
Journalist C. D. B. Bryan turned the Mullen family's intense pain in the wake of Michael's death into a series of articles published in three installments in The New Yorker during March 1976 and then released in book form that year as Friendly Fire. Bryan wrote of the unspoken sounds of pain, "the slam of a hand hitting the table in rage, the breath caught because an onrushing memory was causing too much pain."

The book was turned into the 1979 television film Friendly Fire, starring Carol Burnett. Though best known for her screwball comedy, Burnett pursued the role after reading the script and said how in looking "back at the war now, I see how much of a waste it was", with this film being "the first time that the war has been looked at from the viewpoint of the folks at home." The production won the Emmy Award for best drama special.

== Personal ==
Mullen wrote the 1995 autobiography Unfriendly Fire: A Mother's Memoir, which added dozens of letters from her son and laid out her continuing doubts about the circumstances of her son's death.

She continued her anti-war activism in protesting the Gulf War, and tried to meet with Cindy Sheehan, a mother whose son was killed during the Iraq War, at Sheehan's protests outside George W. Bush's Prairie Chapel Ranch in Crawford, Texas.

== Death ==
Peg Mullen died on October 2, 2009, aged 92, in La Porte City. She was survived by two daughters, a son, six grandchildren and two great-grandchildren. Her resting place is located in Waterloo's Saint Mary's of Mount Carmel Cemetery.
