= Moshe Decter =

American activist for Jewish causes (1921–2007)

Moshe Decter (October 14, 1921 – June 28, 2007) was a New York writer, intellectual, and a prominent activist for Jewish causes and civil rights. His articles in The New Leader and Foreign Affairs first brought the persecution of Soviet Jews to the attention of journalism and policy elites as well as ordinary citizens in the 1950s and 1960s.

Decter also co-wrote with James Rorty a book entitled "McCarthy and the Communists" in 1954 - one of the first major attacks against Republican Wisconsin Senator Joseph McCarthy.

He established and directed the Jewish Minorities Research bureau, served as executive secretary of the Conference on the Status of Soviet Jews and was director of research of the American Jewish Congress. He worked for Nativ or officially for Lishkat Hakesher or The Liaison Bureau, an Israeli liaison organization that maintained contact with Jews living in the Eastern Bloc during the Cold War and encouraged aliyah, or immigration to Israel. After the collapse of the U.S.S.R., he worked as an editor of the Near East Report and served as an adviser to the Israeli Embassy in Washington.

He was the father of Joshua Decter from his second marriage to the late Paula Decter; and he was the father of Naomi Decter and the late Rachel Decter, from his first marriage in the 1950s to the late Midge Rosenthal (who retained the Decter surname after their divorce).
