= Guenter Lewy =

American historian and author (1923–2026)

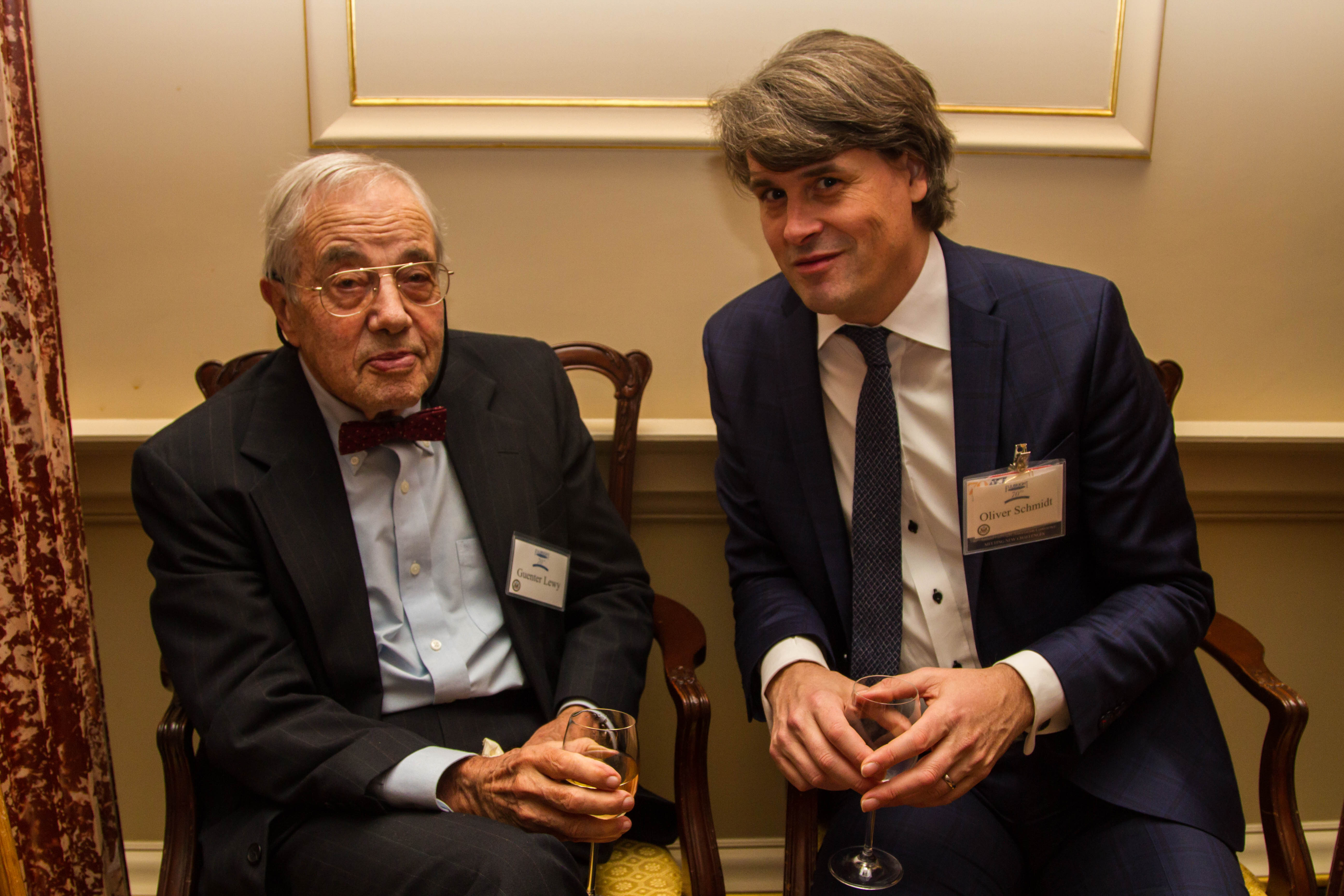
Guenter Lewy (left) with Oliver Schmidt in 2016

Guenter Lewy (22 August 1923 – 24 March 2026) was a German-born American author and political scientist who was a professor of political science at the University of Massachusetts Amherst. His works spanned several topics, but he was most often associated with his 1978 book on the Vietnam War, America in Vietnam, and several controversial works that deal with the applicability of the term genocide to various historical events, including the Romani genocide and the Armenian genocide.

In 1939, he migrated from Germany to Palestine. After World War II, he migrated to the United States to reunite with his parents. Lewy earned a BA at City College in New York City and a MA and PhD at Columbia University. He was on the faculties of Columbia University, Smith College, and the University of Massachusetts Amherst. He later lived in Washington, D.C., and was a frequent contributor to Commentary. Lewy died in Bethesda, Maryland on 24 March 2026, at the age of 102.

== Early life ==
Lewy was born in Breslau, Germany, (now Wrocław, Poland) on 22 August 1923. At the age of nine, he joined a German-Jewish scouts organization called Die Greifen (lit. "the griffins"), which he has suggested was important in shaping his desire for an academic career. Described by Lewy as a "quasi-Romantic" group, Die Greifen emphasized music, literature, and song, particularly Landsknechtlieder, encouraging the youths to avoid becoming "Spiessbürger" ("philistines"). By 1938, as persecution of Jews in Germany increased, Lewy began to lobby his family to leave Germany behind. After Kristallnacht, in November 1938, when his father was interned in Buchenwald for four months and he was beaten, his parents sent him to Mandatory Palestine. Later in the war, when Lewy was of fighting age, he joined the British Army and served in the Jewish Brigade.

== Areas of research ==
=== The Catholic Church and Nazi Germany ===
First published in 1964, Lewy's The Catholic Church and Nazi Germany has proven both controversial and influential. Rolf Hochhuth's play The Deputy had appeared only a year earlier, indicting the Vatican for failing to act to save the Jews during the Holocaust; amidst the Vatican's outrage with the play, Lewy's text continued in the same vein, "One is inclined to conclude that the Pope and his advisers—influenced by the long tradition of moderate anti-Semitism so widely accepted in Vatican circles—did not view the plight of the Jews with a real sense of urgency and moral outrage. For this assertion no documentation is possible, but it is a conclusion difficult to avoid."

The text received much praise, including that of Alfred Grosser, who characterized the text as a "terribly precise volume" which demonstrated that "all the documents show the Catholic Church cooperating with the Nazi regime". The Vatican opted to answer the critical allegations by releasing a series of documents aiming to refute the growing perception of the Vatican having been complicit in the Holocaust. One Jesuit priest answering Lewy's text on behalf of the Vatican suggested that Lewy's conclusions were based "not on the record but on a subjective conviction... This ready acceptance of a Nazi-inspired wartime legend is a measure of Lewy's inability to plumb the motives of Pius XII... There is no proof, in this book or anywhere else, that Pius XII thought Nazism was a 'bulwark' in defense of Christianity."

In the context of other historical works examining the legacy of the Vatican in the era of the Holocaust, Lewy's work has been described as "exceedingly harsh".

=== America in Vietnam ===
Lewy had suggested that his America in Vietnam, published in 1978, would "clear away the cobwebs of mythology that inhibit the correct understanding of what went on—and what went wrong—in Vietnam." The text, which argues against traditional or "orthodox" interpretations of the war as an unnecessary, unjust, and/or unwinnable war replete with disastrous mistakes and widespread American atrocities, has proven influential for many western scholars that share similar views of the conflict. It predated and influenced other reinterpretations including those of Norman Podhoretz, Mark Moyar, and Michael Lind. America in Vietnam thus attracted both criticism and support of Lewy for belonging to the "revisionist" school on Vietnam. Lewy argues,

It is the reasoned conclusion of this study... that the sense of guilt created by the Vietnam war in the minds of many Americans is not warranted and that the charges of officially, condoned illegal and grossly immoral conduct are without substance. Indeed, detailed examination of battlefield practices reveals that the loss civilian life in Vietnam was less great than in World War II and Korea and that concern with minimizing the ravages of the war was strong. To measure and compare the devastation and loss of human life caused by different war will be objectionable to those who repudiate or resort to military force as an instrument of foreign policy and may be construed as callousness. Yet as long as wars do take place at all it remains a moral duty to seek to reduce the agony caused by war, and the fulfillment of this obligation should not be disdained. I hope that this book may help demonstrate that moral convictions are not the exclusive possession of persons in conscience opposed to war, and that those who in certain circumstances accept the necessity and ethical justification of armed conflict also do care about human suffering.

Lewy criticizes what he terms the "war crime industry", and what he perceives to be the double standards of the Western media, which, he alleged, neglected to report equally on the crimes of Vietnamese communists, giving the figure of 36,725 political assassinations perpetrated by the VC/NVA between 1957 and 1972. About the crimes committed by American soldiers, Lewy asserts that "between January 1965 and March 1973, 201 Army personnel in Vietnam were convicted by court-martial of serious offenses against Vietnamese. During the period of March 1965 to August 1971, 77 Marines were convicted of serious crimes against Vietnamese."

In recalling the 1971 congressional testimony of some American veterans who were critical of the war, one of whom compared American action in Vietnam to genocide, Lewy suggests that some "witnesses sounded as if they had memorized North Vietnamese propaganda." The book is critical of domestic opponents of American participation in the Vietnam War. In using the phrases "peace activists" or "peace demonstrations", Lewy often puts quotation marks around the word "peace", implying alternative motivations for the activism. The author alleges a possible connection between cases of sabotage in the Navy and the anti-war movement: "Between 1965 and 1970, the Navy experienced a growing number of cases of sabotage and arson on its ships, but no evidence could be found that antiwar activists had directly participated in a sabotage attempt on a Navy vessel. Cases of fragging and avoidance of combat may well have been instigated at times by antiwar militants, though no hard evidence of organized subversion was ever discovered."

The text was praised by Vietnam veteran and United States Senator Jim Webb, Andrew J. Pierre of Foreign Affairs, and by several newspapers, including The Economist, which described it as "in many ways the best history of the war yet to appear". Critics included historians of the "orthodox" school as well as polemical critics such as linguist and Vietnam War opponent Noam Chomsky. Chomsky, after being singled out for criticism by Lewy in the book, wrote that "every state has its Guenter Lewys". According to Chomsky, Lewy's "concept of the writing of moral-historical tracts... is misrepresentation of documents, uncritical regurgitation of government claims, and dismissal of annoying facts that contradict them, and [his] concept of morality is such as to legitimate virtually any atrocity against civilians once the state has issued its commands."

==== Winter Soldier Investigation ====
America in Vietnam, which appeared seven years after the Winter Soldier Investigation, became controversial in the context of the 2004 United States presidential election. Presidential hopeful John Kerry had been involved with the Winter Soldier Investigation; in the context of the campaign, Lewy's suggestion that the Winter Soldier Investigation was dishonest and politically motivated was frequently cited to impugn John Kerry's reputation. Vietnam Veterans Against the War, the group of which Kerry had been a part, alleged that American war policy and conduct in Vietnam was resulting in war crimes being committed. Lewy suggests that the group used "fake witnesses" in the Winter Soldier hearing in Detroit, and that its allegations were formally investigated.

Government officials have said they have no record of any such Naval Investigative Service report, but that it is possible it could have been lost or destroyed. Lewy later said that he had actually seen the alleged report. "I don't think Lewy is interested in presenting any of [the Winter Soldier testimony] as truthful", University of Richmond history professor Ernest Bolt told the Chicago Tribune. "He has an angle on the war as a whole." Bolt said it is impossible to tell whether Lewy fairly characterized the naval investigative report because no other historian had seen it.

=== The Nazi Persecution of the Gypsies ===
Lewy argues in The Nazi Persecution of the Gypsies, published in 2000, that the Gypsies' overall plight does "not constitute genocide within the meaning of the genocide convention". Lewy concludes that in the case of the Nazi persecution of the Gypsies the "use of the term 'genocide' would seem to involve a dilution of the concept", but that the question is not to determine if the Holocaust is the Nazi's worst crime; to refuse the "genocide" label is not, Lewy argues, a way to minimize the sufferings of Gypsies, Poles, Russians and other non-Jewish victims of Nazism. The introduction is devoted to the long history of violence against Gypsies before the Nazis took power, with a special focus on the laws adopted in Bavaria and some other German Länder at the end of the 19th century and at the beginning of the 20th century, showing the continuity between the last year of the Weimar Republic and the first years of Nazi regime. In a section entitled "Roots of Hostility", Lewy argues that the main reason of the persecution against Gypsies before 1933 was prejudice. Though Gypsies are not a violent people, he adds that prejudice is not always the single reason; the misbehavior of a minority among nomadic Gypsies contributed also to hostility and prejudices.

The book was praised by Saul Friedländer, who called it "a work of great compassion and exemplary scholarship". According to Holocaust historian Raul Hilberg, "Lewy's account of Nazi measures against the powerless Gypsies is unsurpassed in the English language." Henriette Asséo, lecturer at the School for Advanced Studies in the Social Sciences, specialist of Gypsy history, wrote that Lewy's book "requires humility, giving a new, considerable documentation", adding, however, that the rejection of "genocide" label can be "discussed". Hans Mommsen agreed completely with Lewy, including with the rejection of "genocide" qualification. Peter Black states that "this book is a well-documented history of Nazi persecution of the German and Austrian Gypsies. Yet Lewy wastes considerable intellectual energy in demonstrating that the totality of the disaster that befell the Gypsies cannot be compared to the Jewish Holocaust. This leads him to a few questionable conclusions."

The book was criticized by Norman G. Finkelstein who wrote in the Süddeutsche Zeitung:

Lewy's argument goes like this: Gypsies were as ruthlessly slaughtered by the Einsatzgruppen as the Jews, but only because they were suspected of spying; Gypsies were deported to Auschwitz like the Jews, but only "to get rid of them, not to kill them;" Gypsies were gassed at Chelmno like the Jews, but only because they had contracted typhus; most of the few remaining Gypsies were sterilized like the Jews, not however to prevent their propagation but only to "prevent contamination of 'German blood.'"

The book has also been singled out for criticism, particularly by Romani scholars, who believe that it blames the Roma people for their own massacre. Lewy's work has been criticized for being "one-sided" and as a text which "overstates" the differences of the persecution of Jews and the persecution of Roma in the Nazi era, in a manner indicative of "the priorities of latter-day scholarship, about the way that the murder of the Jews has been promoted to obscure so much of the rest of the Nazi record of atrocity".

Journalist Alaric DeArment also highlighted that Lewy's analysis left out key documentary evidence that went against his thesis, including the latter portion of an October 13, 1942 letter from Otto Thierack to Martin Bormann and Bormann's October 18, 1942 response, as well as most of the recollections of SS officer Pery Broad about the experience of Roma at Auschwitz.

=== "Were American Indians the Victims of Genocide?" ===
In September 2004, Lewy published an essay in Commentary entitled "Were American Indians the Victims of Genocide?": "[E]ven if some episodes can be considered genocidal—that is, tending toward genocide—they certainly do not justify condemning an entire society." The paper is highly critical of Ward Churchill, particularly in regards to his attributing the word "genocide" to the destruction of American Indian civilization. Lewy dismissed as bogus Churchill's assertion that the United States Army intentionally spread smallpox among American Indians by distributing infected blankets in 1837.

=== Views on the Armenian genocide ===
==== The Armenian Massacres in Ottoman Turkey: A Disputed Genocide ====
Lewy's book The Armenian Massacres in Ottoman Turkey: A Disputed Genocide was published in 2006 by University of Utah Press after it was rejected by eleven publishers. In the book, Lewy argues that there is insufficient evidence of the Young Turk regime organizing the massacres of Armenians in the Ottoman Empire. In Lewy's view, they have not been proven to have been governmentally organized. About the number of Armenian victims, Lewy argues that it "can only be estimated, because no death statistics for this period exist"; calculating the total losses of Ottoman Armenians between 1914 and 1919, Lewy uses the figure of 1,750,000 individuals for the pre-war population in the whole Ottoman Empire, figure used by historians like Charles Dowsett and Malcolm E. Yapp, then estimate the number of survivors in 1919 to around 1,108,000, making an average of several estimations, including the tabulation of George Montgomery (American official in the Paris Peace Conference in charge of Near East) and the figure of the Armenian National Council of Constantinople; so, Lewy estimates the total losses for World War I to around 642,000.

Lewy's position that there is insufficient evidence to prove that the Armenians were victims of genocide is in contrast to the view of most historians and genocide scholars. The reception of the book was negative overall, with several scholars criticizing the book for factual errors and cherry-picking sources to fit Lewy's thesis. The sociologist Taner Akçam published a lengthy review of Lewy's work, criticizing his methodology and lack of familiarity with the workings of the Ottoman state. He also faulted him for basing his arguments on questionable premises and making select use of sources which conform to his own views and conclusions.

According to Joseph Albert Kechichian, writing in the International Journal of Middle East Studies:

Lewy has been amply rewarded by Turkish authorities in Ankara and abroad through the launching of a massive campaign to distribute his book free of charge to libraries and to select groups of diplomats. Equally noteworthy, Lewy has been decorated at a special ceremony in Ankara with, ironically, the İnsanlığa Karşı İşlenen Suçlar Yüksek Ödülü (High Award for Fighting in Opposition to Crimes Against Humanity) ... [by] a well-known organization whose mission includes the systematic denial of the Armenian genocide through propagandistic and partisan research and publications; the organization is sponsored and underwritten by the Turkish government.

Some scholars consider Lewy's book to represent Armenian genocide denial, indeed to be one of "the key texts of modern denial". Historian A. Dirk Moses states that Lewy attributes collective guilt to all Armenians for the military actions of some. "The collective guilt accusation is unacceptable in scholarship, let alone in normal discourse and is, I think, one of the key ingredients in genocidal thinking."

==== SPLC lawsuit ====
According to Mark Potok, editor of the Intelligence Report journal of Southern Poverty Law Center, the facts of the Armenian genocide are quite well known. The ruling party of the day massacred intellectuals, forced hundreds of thousands of Armenians into what amounted to death marches, and systematically despoiled the victims of their property. Professor Raphael Lemkin coined the word "genocide" in 1943 with the Armenian slaughter in mind. In 2005, the International Association of Genocide Scholars (IAGS) wrote the Turkish foreign minister to remind him that the massacre of Christian Armenians was indeed "a systematic genocide".

On 17 November 2008, Lewy filed a defamation suit against the Southern Poverty Law Center, Inc., and writer-editor David Holthouse in the United States District Court for the District of Columbia. On 28 September 2010 the case was settled when the SPLC agreed to publish a retraction and apologize to Lewy for suggesting that he was "a Turkish agent". In its statement, the SPLC stated that it had erred in assuming that "any scholar who challenges the Armenian genocide narrative necessarily has been financially compromised by the government of Turkey." The settlement with Lewy included an undisclosed monetary payment. Lewy's counsel in the case, David Salzman and Bruce Fein, lead the Turkish Coalition of America's Turkish American Legal Defense Fund.

=== Uniqueness of the Holocaust ===
Multiple historians have accused Lewy of having an agenda in his scholarship, to emphasize the uniqueness of the Holocaust and discredit other claims of genocide regardless of the evidence. David B. MacDonald states that Lewy "seems unwilling to allow any other genocide to compete with the Holocaust". In the Journal of Genocide Research, David Stannard called Lewy "one of the last of a disappearing breed: the extreme 'uniqueness' advocate determined to assert—in the face of contrary and increasingly overwhelming fact and logic—that, of all the mass killings that have ever occurred in the history of the world, only the Holocaust... rose to the level of true 'genocide.'"

Lewy responded, stating that he believed the Cambodian genocide and Rwandan genocide were genocides, and adding: "With Yehuda Bauer I would call the Holocaust unprecedented but not unique, because the term unique suggests that something like the Holocaust can never happen again."

== Published works ==
- Constitutionalism and Statecraft During the Golden Age of Spain: A Study of the Political Philosophy of Juan de Mariana. Geneva: Droz. 1960.
- Religion and Revolution. Oxford University Press. 1974. ISBN 978-0-19-501744-1.
- America in Vietnam. New York-Oxford: Oxford University Press. 1978. ISBN 978-0-19-502732-7.
- False Consciousness: An Essay on Mystification. Transaction Publishers. 1982. ISBN 978-0878554515.
- Peace and Revolution: The Moral Crisis of American Pacifism. Grand Rapids, Michigan: W.B. Eerdmans Pub. Co. 1988. ISBN 978-0-8028-3640-3.
- The Cause That Failed: Communism in American Political Life. New York-Oxford: Oxford University Press. 1990. ISBN 978-0-19-505748-5.
- Why America Needs Religion: Secular Modernity and Its Discontents. Grand Rapids, Michigan: Eerdmans. 1996. ISBN 978-0-8028-4162-9.
- The Catholic Church and Nazi Germany. Da Capo Press. 2000. ISBN 978-0-306-80931-6. (First edition, New York: McGraw-Hill, 1964.)
- The Nazi Persecution of the Gypsies. New York-Oxford: Oxford University Press. 2000. ISBN 978-0-19-514240-2.
- The Armenian Massacres in Ottoman Turkey: A Disputed Genocide. University of Utah Press. 2005. ISBN 978-0-87480-849-0.
- If God is Dead, Everything is Permitted?. Routledge. 2008. ISBN 978-1-41280-756-2.
- Assisted Death in Europe and America: Four Regimes and Their Lessons. Oxford University Press. 2011. ISBN 978-0-19-974641-5.
- Essays on Genocide and Humanitarian Intervention. Utah University Press. 2012. ISBN 978-1-60781-187-9.
- Outlawing Genocide Denial: The Dilemmas of Official Historical Truth. University of Utah Press. 2014. ISBN 978-1-60781-372-9.
- Harmful and Undesirable: Book Censorship in Nazi Germany. Oxford University Press. 2016. ISBN 978-0-19-027528-0.
- Perpetrators: The World of the Holocaust Killers. Oxford University Press. 2017. ISBN 978-0-19-066113-7.
- Jews and Germans: Promise, Tragedy, and the Search for Normalcy. University of Nebraska Press. 2020. ISBN 978-0-82-761503-8.
