= C. D. B. Bryan =

American author and journalist

- Born: Courtlandt Dixon Barnes Bryan; April 22, 1936; New York City, U.S.
- Died: December 15, 2009 (aged 73); Guilford, Connecticut, U.S.
- Education: Yale University, B.A., 1958; Berkshire School
- Occupations: Writer; editor; professor
- Employer(s): Monocle (Editor-in-Chief, 1961–65); The New Yorker; Lynn Nesbit at Janklow & Nesbit Literary Agency
- Known for: Friendly Fire (film) (1979); Friendly Fire (1976); P. S. Wilkinson (1965); So Much Unfairness of Things (1965)
- Parent(s): Joseph Bryan III; Katharine (Barnes) Bryan; John O'Hara (stepfather)
- Awards: Harper Prize (1965); Peabody Award (1980)

Courtlandt Dixon Barnes Bryan (April 22, 1936 – December 15, 2009), better known as C. D. B. Bryan, was an American author and journalist.

== Biography ==
He was born on April 22, 1936, in Manhattan, New York City. His parents were Joseph Bryan III and Katharine Barnes Bryan; after they divorced his mother married author John O'Hara.

Bryan attended Episcopal High School in Alexandria, Virginia from 1949 till 1952, and the Berkshire School in the class of 1954 and earned a Bachelor of Arts at Yale University in 1958, where he wrote for campus humor magazine The Yale Record. He was also a member of the fraternity St. Anthony Hall.

He served in the U.S. Army in South Korea (1958–1960), but not happily. He was mobilized again (1961–1962) for the Berlin Crisis of 1961. He was an intelligence officer.

Bryan sold his first short story to The New Yorker in 1961.

He was editor of the satirical Monocle (from 1961 until 1965), Colorado State University writer-in-residence (winter 1967), visiting lecturer University of Iowa writers workshop (1967–1969), special editorial consultant at Yale (1970), visiting professor at the University of Wyoming (1975), adjunct professor Columbia University (1976), fiction director at the New York City Writers Community from (1977), lecturer in English at University of Virginia (spring 1983), and Bard Center fellow at Bard College (spring 1984).

His first novel, P. S. Wilkinson, won the Harper Prize in 1965.

Bryan is best known for his non-fiction book Friendly Fire (1976). It began as an idea he sold to William Shawn for an article in The New Yorker, then grew into a series of articles, and then a book. It describes an Iowa farm family, Gene and Peg Mullen, and their reaction and change of heart after their son's accidental death by friendly fire in the Vietnam War. One of the real-life characters featured in the book was future Operation Desert Storm commander H. Norman Schwarzkopf.

It was made into an Emmy-winning 1979 television movie of the same name, for which Bryan shared a Peabody Award. It has also been cited in professional military studies.

Bryan died from cancer on December 15, 2009, at his home in Guilford, Connecticut.

== Works ==
Bryan contributed articles to many periodicals, including The New York Times, The New York Times Magazine, The New York Times Book Review, The New Yorker, The New Republic, Esquire, Harper's, Saturday Review, and The Weekly Standard. He additionally authored the narration for the 1963 Swedish film The Face of War.

Books (non-fiction)

- Friendly Fire. New York City: G. P. Putnam's Sons, 1976.

Adapted by Fay Kanin into the 1979 television movie of the same name. A Book-of-the-Month Club selected alternate.

- The National Air and Space Museum. New York City: Abrams Books, 1979.

A Book-of-the-Month Club selected alternate. Second edition included photographs by Jonathan Wallen, 1988.

- The National Geographic Society: 100 Years of Adventure and Discovery. New York City: Abrams Books, 1987.
- Close Encounters of the Fourth Kind: Alien Abduction, UFOs and the Conference at M.I.T.. New York City: Alfred A. Knopf, 1995. ISBN 0679429751.

Books (novels)

- P. S. Wilkinson. New York City: Harper & Row, 1965.

"Portions of this novel appeared originally in The New Yorker."

- The Great Dethriffe. New York City: Dutton, 1970.
- Beautiful Women; Ugly Scenes. New York City: Doubleday, 1983. ISBN 0440305365.

A Literary Guild alternate.

Book contributions

- "Introduction." In the Eye of Desert Storm: Photographers of the Gulf War. New York City: Harry N. Abrams, Inc. / Professional Photography Division of Eastman Kodak Company, 1991. ISBN 0810934604 / ISBN 978-0810934603.

Book reviews

- "By War Possessed." Review of Winners and Losers by Gloria Emerson. Saturday Review, February 5, 1977, pp. 22–23.
- "Combat Junky." Review of A Rumor of War by Philip Caputo. Saturday Review, June 11, 1977, pp. 36–37.

Short stories

- "So Much Unfairness of Things." The New Yorker, June 2, 1962, p. 31. Full text available.

A Literary Guild selection.
