= Friendly Fire (1979 film) =

1979 American television film

- Genre: Drama; War
- Based on: Friendly Fire by C. D. B. Bryan
- Written by: Fay Kanin
- Directed by: David Greene
- Starring: Carol Burnett; Ned Beatty; Sam Waterston
- Music by: Leonard Rosenman
- Country of origin: United States
- Original language: English

Production
- Executive producer: Martin Starger
- Producers: Philip Barry Jr. Fay Kanin
- Production location: Stockton, California
- Cinematography: Harry J. May
- Editor: Michael Economou
- Running time: 147 minutes
- Production companies: Marble Arch Productions; Martin Starger Productions

Original release
- Network: ABC
- Release: April 22, 1979

Friendly Fire is an American television movie first broadcast on the ABC network on April 22, 1979. Watched that night by an estimated 64 million people, Friendly Fire went on to win four Emmy awards, including Outstanding Drama Special. The film was directed by David Greene.

The movie tells the real-life story of Peg Mullen (played by Carol Burnett), a woman from rural Iowa who with her husband works against government obstacles to uncover the actual details and facts about the death of their son Michael, an Army infantry soldier killed by "friendly fire" in February 1970 during the Vietnam War. Her husband Gene, a World War II veteran, is played by Ned Beatty.

Sergeant Mullen was drafted in September 1968 after he graduated from college and sent to South Vietnam (Republic of Vietnam) assigned to the 198th Infantry Brigade, 23rd Infantry Division (Americal Division) in September 1969. He was listed as a non-battle casualty after being accidentally killed with another soldier from an exploding Army artillery shell burst fragment, while Mullen and most of his platoon were asleep at night on their hilltop position; the government did not report publicly the number of non-battle deaths or their names on its weekly casualty lists during the war.

Friendly Fire is adapted by Fay Kanin from C. D. B. Bryan's 1976 book of the same name. The book was adapted from a series of New Yorker magazine articles Bryan had written about the Mullens and their ordeal.

== Cast ==
- Carol Burnett as Peg Mullen
- Ned Beatty as Gene Mullen
- Sam Waterston as C. D. B. Bryan
- Dennis Erdman as Michael E. Mullen
- Timothy Hutton as John Mullen
- Fanny Spiess as Mary Mullen
- Sherry Hursey as Patricia Mullen
- Michael Flanagan as Father Shimon
- Hilly Hicks as Willis Huddleston
- William Jordan as Col. Byron Schindler
- Vernon Weddle as Col. Georgi
- Nicolas Coster as Carl
- Charles Cyphers as Tom Loomis
- Ford Rainey as Mr. Hamilton
- Jack Rader as Sgt. Fitzgerald
- Robert Wahler as Alan Hulting
- David Keith as Leroy Hamilton
- Bernard Behrens as Dietrich

== See also ==
- 6th Infantry Regiment (United States)
- Vietnam War casualties
