= Midge Decter =

American journalist and author (1927–2022)

- Born: Midge Rosenthal; July 25, 1927; Saint Paul, Minnesota, U.S.
- Died: May 9, 2022 (aged 94); New York City, New York, U.S.
- Occupations: Journalist, author, writer
- Spouses: Moshe Decter (m. 1948; div. 1954) Norman Podhoretz (m. 1956)
- Children: 4; including Rachel Abrams, Ruthie Blum and John Podhoretz

Midge Decter (née Rosenthal; July 25, 1927 – May 9, 2022) was an American journalist and author. Originally liberal, she was one of the pioneers of the neoconservative movement in the 1970s and 1980s. She was a critic of feminism and the women's liberation movement.

== Early life ==
Decter was born in Saint Paul, Minnesota, on July 25, 1927. She was the youngest of three daughters of Rose (née Calmenson) and Harry Rosenthal, a sporting goods merchant. Her family was middle-class and Jewish. She attended the University of Minnesota for one year, the Jewish Theological Seminary of America from 1946 to 1948, and New York University, but did not graduate from any of them. She initially identified as a liberal on the political spectrum.

== Career ==
Decter was assistant editor at Midstream, before working as secretary to the then-editor of Commentary, Robert Warshow. Later she was the executive editor of Harper's Magazine under Willie Morris. She then began working in publishing as an editor at Basic Books and Legacy Books. Her writing has been published in Commentary, First Things, The Atlantic, National Review, The New Republic, The Weekly Standard, and The American Spectator.

Together with Donald Rumsfeld, Decter was the co-chair of the Committee for the Free World, an anti-communist organization. She was one of the original champions of the neoconservative movement with her spouse, Norman Podhoretz. She was also a founder of the Independent Women's Forum, and was founding treasurer for the Northcote Parkinson Fund, founded and chaired by John Train. She was a member of the board of trustees for The Heritage Foundation. She was also a board member of the Center for Security Policy and the Clare Boothe Luce Fund. A member of the Philadelphia Society, she was, for a time, its president.

Decter was arguably the leading female anti-feminist in the United States prior to Phyllis Schlafly's rise to prominence. A critic of the women's liberation movement, she defended "traditional" gender roles and "family values." She was also a critic of the gay rights movement.

Following a tongue-in-cheek remark by Russell Kirk, the Society's founder, about the prevalence of Jewish intellectuals in the neoconservative movement, Decter labelled Kirk an anti-Semite. She was also a senior fellow at the Institute of Religion and Public Life. She was one of the signatories to Statement of Principles for the Project for the New American Century. Decter served on the national advisory board of Accuracy in Media.

In 2008, Midge Decter received the Truman-Reagan Medal of Freedom from the Victims of Communism Memorial Foundation.

== Public lectures ==
In 1995, Decter delivered the ninth Erasmus Lecture, titled A Jew in Anti-Christian America, sponsored by First Things magazine and the Institute on Religion and Public Life. In her address, Decter reflected on the cultural and moral landscape of late twentieth-century America, examining tensions between Jewish identity, secularism, and the country’s Christian heritage. The lecture was widely noted for its candid discussion of faith and public life from a Jewish perspective.

== Personal life ==
Decter married her first husband, Moshe Decter, in 1948. Together, they had two children: Naomi and Rachel, who predeceased Decter in 2013. They divorced in 1954. Two years later, she married Norman Podhoretz, a neoconservative, who went on to become editor of Commentary magazine. They remained married until her death. Together, they had two children: Ruthie Blum and John Podhoretz.

Decter lived most of her adult life in Manhattan. She died on May 9, 2022, at her home in Manhattan. She was 94 years old.

== Publications ==
External videos
- Booknotes interview with Decter on An Old Wife's Tale, October 7, 2001, C-SPAN
- Presentation by Decter on Always Right, November 1, 2002, C-SPAN
- Presentation by Decter on Rumsfeld, October 14, 2003, C-SPAN
- Washington Journal interview with Decter on Rumsfeld, April 23, 2004, C-SPAN

- Losing the First Battle, Winning the War
- The Liberated Woman and Other Americans (1970)
- The New Chastity and Other Arguments Against Women's Liberation (1972) ISBN 978-0-698-10450-1
- Liberal Parents, Radical Children (1975) ISBN 978-0-698-10675-8
- An Old Wife's Tale: My Seven Decades in Love and War (2001) ISBN 978-0-06-039428-8
- Always Right: Selected Writings of Midge Decter (2002) ISBN 978-0-89195-108-7
- Rumsfeld : A Personal Portrait (2003) ISBN 978-0-06-056091-1
