= So Much Unfairness of Things =

"So Much Unfairness of Things" is a short story written by C. D. B. Bryan.

Reprinted many times, the story was originally published in the June 2, 1962 issue of The New Yorker. During the story, an exam taken by the protagonist is explicitly dated as June 7, 1962.

== Plot summary ==
Phillip Sadler Wilkinson, a 14-year-old student at Virginia Preparatory School (V.P.S.) has twice failed the Latin exam. Phillip, or P.S. as he's known to his friends and other students, claims he's studied but has very bad studying habits and is easily distracted. VPS has a long tradition of students; all bound by an honor code which requires students to report misdeeds like cheating - their own and those of others. P.S. is desperate to pass the Latin exam, in order that he not displease his father, himself a VPS graduate, as were previous generations of Wilkinson men (along with members of his mother's family: the library is named for the Wilkinsons and the gymnasium for the Sadlers). During the exam, P.S. recognizes one of the questions is based on class work he has in his desk and copies it. P.S. is sure that no one saw him cheat, not even his friend, "Jumbo". After the exam, P.S. feels guilty but doesn't tell anyone. He smokes a cigarette in bathroom while contemplating what he has done. P.S. decides to live with his guilt. Nevertheless, P.S. soon learns that he was spotted cheating by Jumbo who, following the honor code, reports him, and P.S. is asked by the prefect Mabrey to come with him to the Honor Court where Dr. Fairfax and the headmaster are as well. At the school "honor court" P.S. is found guilty of cheating and is expelled from VPS. P.S.'s father picks P.S. from school. He is disappointed with his son's actions but is not angry as P.S. expects, but rather is trying to determine where he had gone wrong in raising P.S. The two leave school together. The story suggests that despite P.S.'s misdeeds and punishment, an emotional gulf between the two is now more likely to be bridged.
