= Ruthie Blum =

American-Israeli journalist

Ruthie Blum (Hebrew: רותי בלום) is an American-Israeli journalist, columnist, former features editor of the Jerusalem Post, and web editor at The Algemeiner Journal as of 2016..Blum was formerly an advisor in the office of Israeli Prime Minister Benjamin Netanyahu. She is the senior contributing editor at The Jewish News Syndicate as of 2025.

Blum is the daughter of Commentary editor Norman Podhoretz and Midge Decter. She graduated from the Bronx High School of Science in 1976 and immigrated to Israel in 1977.

She has been described by left-wing journalist Craig Unger as "doyenne of the right-wing Bohemian set in Jerusalem."

She was previously married to former Israel Broadcasting Authority News Editor-in-Chief Steve Leibowitz, during which time she lived in Har Adar, an Israeli settlement near Jerusalem. Blum has four children.

== Published works ==
- To Hell in a Handbasket: Carter, Obama, and the ‘Arab Spring’
