= Emergency Committee for Israel =

American political advocacy organization

The Emergency Committee for Israel is a right-wing nonprofit political advocacy organization in the United States.

== Founding and organization ==
The group's board members include Weekly Standard editor William Kristol, former Republican presidential candidate Gary Bauer, and former member, conservative writer Rachel Abrams, wife of Elliott Abrams. Noah Pollak is its executive director.

Kristol said the group, created in mid-2010, was inspired by the new "liberal" J Street group, "whose ability to amplify criticism of the Israeli government showed the power of a small new group—if on the other side of the debate." Pollak said, shortly after the group's creation, that it planned to be involved in a number of congressional races. "We want to be hard-hitting; we want to get into the debate and shake things up and make some points in a firm way", he said.

== Activities ==
As it started up, the organization ran ads opposing the elections of U.S. Senate candidate Joe Sestak and U.S. House of Representatives candidates Rush D. Holt, Jr., Mary Jo Kilroy, and John F. Tierney, portraying them as "openly hostile" to Israel.

In October 2011, the committee produced a video portraying Occupy Wall Street as antisemitic. The Washington Post columnist Richard Cohen referred to the video and said he found no evidence of antisemitism during his two visits to the demonstration site.

In February 2012, the committee produced a 30-minute documentary covering President Barack Obama's record on Israel. The documentary was viewed 200,000 times in its first week.

In June 2012, the committee ran an ad encouraging the US Government to immediately put an end to Iran's nuclear program. The ad ran in New York; Washington, DC; and additional markets.

In October 2012, the group released a robo-call which combined clips of Obama from 2009 and 2011 and a clip from a speech Benjamin Netanyahu gave in 2012, in a form that appeared as if the two were having a debate. Pollak said that month that his group would release further "secret Obama–Netanyahu debate recordings".

In January 2013, the grouped launched a site opposing the nomination of Chuck Hagel as Secretary of Defense.
