= My Negro Problem—And Ours =

1963 essay by Norman Podhoretz

- Created: 1963
- Author: Norman Podhoretz
- Media type: Essay
- Subject: African American–Jewish relations, Antisemitism, Racism

"My Negro Problem—And Ours" is a controversial essay by Norman Podhoretz, published in Commentary magazine in February 1963.

== About ==
The essay addresses Podhoretz's self-admitted racism, which he calls "the hatred I still feel for Negroes", based on his interactions with African-Americans while growing up as a white working-class Jewish boy in Brownsville, Brooklyn. In his integrated neighborhood, people were either African-American or white. The white people were mostly Italians who spoke Italian and whose grandparents had immigrated from Sicily, or Yiddish-speaking Ashkenazi Jews from Eastern European immigrant backgrounds. In the essay, Podhoretz related incidents of bullying from African-American children in the neighborhood. He expresses that as a child he felt "puzzled" by the idea that "all Jews were rich" and that "all Negroes were persecuted", because his observation was that "the only Jews I knew were poor" and that Black people "were doing the only persecuting I knew about - and doing it, moreover, to me." Podhoretz relates an incident where a non-Jewish Black friend hit him and refused to play with him because "I had killed Jesus"; after asking his mother for an explanation, she "cursed the goyim and the Schwartzes, the Schwartzes and the goyim" in Yiddish and told him to ignore "such foolishness". Despite expressing disgust for interracial marriage, Podhoretz writes that widespread interrmariage and the subsequent erasing of racial differences could be a solution to racism: "I believe that the wholesale merging of the two races is the most desirable alternative for everyone concerned."

== Reception ==
Receiving both praise for honesty and condemnation for racism, the essay has been called both notorious and brave.

In We Real Cool: Black Men and Masculinity (2004), bell hooks writes that the essay shows a "fascination with black masculinity", noting that Podhoretz wrote that he "envied Negroes for what seemed to me their superior masculinity" and "what seems to be their superior physical grace and beauty."

The Black Jewish writer Nylah Burton wrote in The Forward that the essay is "drivel" that "traffic[s] in hateful stereotypes" and refers to Podhoretz's views on Black masculinity as "creepy" and "fetishizing". Burton condemns Commentary for calling the essay "one of the Most Controversial and Powerful Essays Published in Commentary." : "How in 2018 can you brag about having published an article called 'My Negro Problem'? How can you call it the most powerful essay ever published? This fact alone should show us what this publication stands for: rampant anti-blackness, hidden under the thin veneer of 'intellectual rigor' ... Commentary in other words, still has a 'Negro Problem.'"

== See also ==
- African American–Jewish relations
- Racism in Jewish communities
