= Mark Moyar =

American academic (born 1971)

Mark A. Moyar
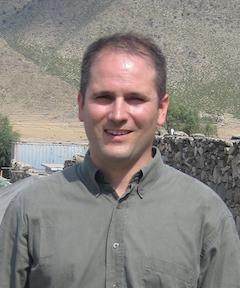
- Born: May 12, 1971 (age 55); Cleveland, Ohio, U.S.

Academic background
- Education: Harvard University (B.A.); Cambridge University (Ph.D.)
- Alma mater: Harvard University; University of Cambridge

Academic work
- Discipline: Military history
- Institutions: Hillsdale College; Center for Strategic and International Studies
- Website: www.markmoyar.com

Mark A. Moyar (born May 12, 1971) is the former Director of the Office for Civilian-Military Cooperation at the US Agency for International Development, a political appointment he received during the first Trump administration. He currently serves as the William P. Harris Chair of Military History at Hillsdale College. He served previously as the Director of the Project on Military and Diplomatic History at the Center for Strategic and International Studies, and has been a Senior Fellow at the Foreign Policy Research Institute and a member of the Hoover Institution Working Group on the Role of Military History in Contemporary Conflict.

== Early life ==
Moyar was born May 12, 1971, in Cleveland, Ohio to Bert and Marjorie Moyar. He graduated from Hawken School in Gates Mills, Ohio in 1989.

== Education ==
Moyar received a B.A. degree summa cum laude in history from Harvard University in 1993, and a Ph.D. in history from the University of Cambridge in 2003. While a student at Harvard, he wrote for the conservative student newspaper The Harvard Salient. He also played saxophone in the Harvard Jazz Band with legendary saxophonist Joshua Redman.

== Accomplishments ==
His articles on historical and current events have appeared in The New York Times, The Wall Street Journal, and The Washington Post. During his time as a Senior Fellow at the Joint Special Operations University (2013–2015), he published three lengthy studies on special operations—in Colombia, Afghanistan, and Mali: Village Stability Operations and the Afghan Local Police (2014), Countering Violent Extremism in Mali (2015), and Persistent Engagement in Colombia (2014)

Moyar is the author of the 2006 book Triumph Forsaken: The Vietnam War, 1954–1965. In it he argues that Ngo Dinh Diem was an effective leader. Moyar states that supporting the November 1963 coup was one of the worst American mistakes of the war. The other biggest mistakes according to Moyar were: the failure to cut the Ho Chi Minh trail, and the United States Congress' refusal to support the South Vietnamese government after the 1973 Paris Peace Accords were violated, and the refusal of emergency aid to South Vietnam near the end of the war.

Triumph Forsaken caused a great stir and many opinionated reviews, some negative, as well as some positive. In response to the reactions engendered by the book, Andrew Wiest and Michael J. Doidge edited Triumph Revisited: Historians Battle for the Vietnam War (2010), a collection of detailed reviews of the book by 15 different academic historians. The reviews are attached to responses by Moyar, who challenges the criticism of his work.

In 2022, Moyar published the second volume of his Vietnam War trilogy, Triumph Regained: The Vietnam War, 1965–1968. Continuing the revisionist thesis he began in Triumph Forsaken, Moyar argues that the United States and South Vietnam were militarily winning the war during this period, and that major political decisions in Washington, rather than battlefield failure, ultimately led to defeat.

Triumph Regained: The Vietnam War, 1965–1968 (2022) continued Moyar’s revisionist interpretation of the war. The book has been reviewed and discussed in military history and conservative-leaning publications, where it was praised for its extensive use of primary sources and its challenge to the conventional narrative that the war was unwinnable by the mid-1960s.

In 2025, Moyar was awarded the Freedom and Opportunity Academic Prize by the Heritage Foundation for his scholarship and teaching in military history.

== Scholarship ==
Moyar is best known for his revisionist scholarship on the Vietnam War. His book Triumph Forsaken: The Vietnam War, 1954–1965 (2006) challenged the prevailing academic consensus by arguing that the United States and South Vietnam were militarily winning the war until the 1963 assassination of President Ngo Dinh Diem. The book sparked significant scholarly debate and was the subject of multiple academic reviews. His later works include A Question of Command: Counterinsurgency Leadership from the Civil War to Iraq (2009), Oppose Any Foe: The Rise of America’s Special Operations Forces (2017), and Triumph Regained: The Vietnam War, 1965–1968 (2022).

== Press coverage ==
Moyar has been a frequent contributor to major national publications. He has written op-eds for The New York Times, including “An Officer and a Creative Man” (2009), “America’s Dangerous Love for Special Ops” (2017), and “Was Vietnam Winnable?” (2017). He has also published multiple pieces in The Wall Street Journal, such as “Vietnam’s Giap Reappraised” (2013), “JFK and the Seeds of Disaster in Vietnam” (2013), and “When America Abandoned an Ally” (2017).

Moyar’s books have received significant attention in academic and military journals. His most influential work, Triumph Forsaken: The Vietnam War, 1954–1965, was reviewed in The Journal of Military History. His scholarship has also been discussed in The Wall Street Journal in response to the Ken Burns documentary on Vietnam.

He has additionally written for The Atlantic.

== Books ==
- Phoenix and the Birds of Prey: The CIA's Secret Campaign to Destroy the Viet Cong (1997) ISBN 1-55750-593-4
  - Republished in 2007 as Phoenix and the Birds of Prey: Counterinsurgency and Counterterrorism in Vietnam with a foreword by Harry Summers and a new preface and chapter; ISBN 0-8032-1602-5
- Triumph Forsaken: The Vietnam War, 1954–1965 (2006) ISBN 0-521-86911-0
- A Question of Command: Counterinsurgency from the Civil War to Iraq (2009) ISBN 0-300-15276-0
- Strategic Failure: How President Obama's Drone Warfare, Defense Cuts, and Military Amateurism Have Imperiled America (2015) ISBN 1-4767-1324-3
- Aid for Elites: Building Partner Nations and Ending Poverty through Human Capital (2016) ISBN 978-1-107-12548-3
- Oppose Any Foe: The Rise of America’s Special Operations Forces (2017) ISBN 978-0465053933
- Triumph Regained: The Vietnam War, 1965-1968 (2022) ISBN 978-1641772976
- Masters of Corruption: How the Federal Bureaucracy Sabotaged the Trump Presidency (2024) ISBN 978-1641773850
