= Norman Podhoretz =

American writer (1930–2025)

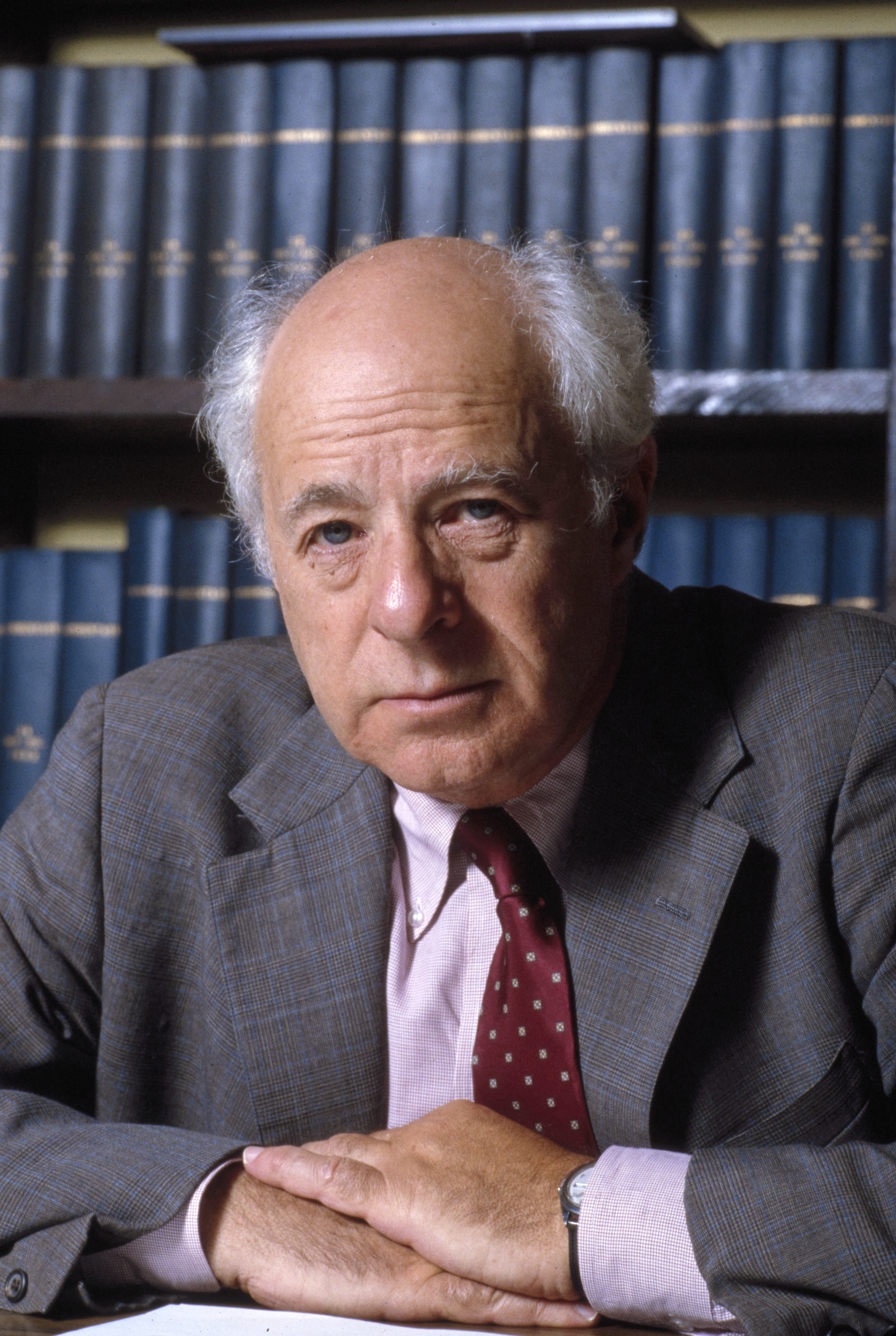
- Podhoretz in 1986
- Born: January 16, 1930; New York City, U.S.
- Died: December 16, 2025 (aged 95); New York City, U.S.
- Education: Columbia University (BA); Jewish Theological Seminary of America (BA); Clare College, Cambridge (BA, MA)
- Occupations: Author; political commentator
- Spouse: Midge Decter (m. 1956; died 2022)
- Children: John Podhoretz; Ruthie Blum
- Writing career
- Subjects: Neoconservatism; American conservatism; politics; anti-communism

Norman Harold Podhoretz (/pɒdˈhɔːrɪts/; January 16, 1930 – December 16, 2025) was an American magazine editor, writer, and conservative political commentator. He described his views as "paleo-neoconservative", but only "because [he'd] been one for so long". He was a writer for Commentary magazine, and served as the publication's editor-in-chief from 1960 to 1995.

Podhoretz was a member of the executive committee of the Writers and Artists for Peace in the Middle East, a pro-Israel group.

== Early life and education ==
The son of Julius and Helen (Woliner) Podhoretz, Jewish immigrants from the Central European region of Galicia (then part of Poland, now Ukraine), Norman Harold Podhoretz was born on January 16, 1930, in Brownsville, Brooklyn, where he was also raised. Podhoretz's family was leftist, with his elder sister joining a socialist youth movement. He skipped two grades and attended the prestigious Boys High School in the borough's Bedford-Stuyvesant neighborhood, ultimately graduating third in his class in 1946; his classmates included the prominent Assyriologist William W. Hallo and advertising executive Carl Spielvogel. Following his admission to Harvard University and New York University with partial tuition scholarships, Podhoretz ultimately elected to attend Columbia University when he was granted a full Pulitzer Scholarship.

In 1950, Podhoretz received his BA degree in English literature from Columbia, where he was mentored by Lionel Trilling. He concurrently earned a second bachelor's degree in Hebrew literature from the nearby Jewish Theological Seminary of America; although Podhoretz never intended to enter the rabbinate, his father (who only attended synagogue on the High Holidays) wanted to ensure that his son was nonetheless conversant in "the intellectual tradition of his people", as "a nonobservant New World Jew who ... treasured the Hebraic tradition".

After being awarded the Kellett Fellowship from Columbia and a Fulbright Scholarship, he later received a second B.A. in literature with first-class honors and an Oxbridge MA from Clare College, Cambridge, where he briefly pursued doctoral studies after rejecting a graduate fellowship from Harvard. He also served in the United States Army from 1953 to 1955 as a draftee assigned to the Army Security Agency.

== Career ==
Podhoretz served as Commentary magazine's editor-in-chief from 1960 (when he replaced Elliot E. Cohen) until his retirement in 1995. Podhoretz remained Commentary's editor-at-large until his death in late 2025. In 1963, he wrote the essay "My Negro Problem—And Ours", in which he described the oppression he felt from African-Americans as a child, and concluded by calling for a color-blind society and advocating "the wholesale merging of the two races [as] the most desirable alternative for everyone concerned".

From 1981 to 1987, Podhoretz was an adviser to the U.S. Information Agency. From 1995 to 2003, he was a senior fellow at the Hudson Institute. He was awarded the Presidential Medal of Freedom by George W. Bush in 2004. The award recognized Podhoretz's intellectual contributions as editor-in-chief of Commentary magazine and as a senior fellow at the Hudson Institute.

Podhoretz was one of the original signatories of the "Statement of Principles" of the Project for the New American Century founded in 1997. The aforementioned organization sent a letter to U.S. President Bill Clinton in 1998 advocating the removal by force of Saddam Hussein in Iraq.

Podhoretz received the Guardian of Zion Award from the Ingeborg Rennert Center for Jerusalem Studies at Bar-Ilan University on May 24, 2007.

He served as a senior foreign policy advisor to Rudy Giuliani in his 2008 presidential campaign. The same year, he publicly advocated an American attack on Iran.

Podhoretz's 2009 book Why Are Jews Liberals? questions why American Jews for decades have been dependable Democrats, often supporting the party by margins of better than two-to-one, even in years of Republican landslides.

== Personal life and death ==
Podhoretz attended a Conservative Jewish synagogue, noted for its emphasis on serious praying, active participation by its members and religious services.

Podhoretz was married to author Midge Decter from 1956 until her death in 2022, and together they had two children: syndicated columnist and Commentary editor-in-chief John Podhoretz and American-Israeli journalist Ruthie Blum. Norman Podhoretz said in early 2019, of his large family and its relation to his political views: "[I]f [Donald Trump] doesn't win in 2020, I would despair of the future. I have 13 grandchildren and 12 great grandchildren, and they are hostages to fortune. So I don't have the luxury of not caring what's going to happen after I'm gone." Podhoretz lived on the Upper East Side of Manhattan.

Podhoretz died from pneumonia in Manhattan on December 16, 2025, at the age of 95.

== Political views ==
Initially a staunch liberal, Podhoretz moved Commentary to the left editorially when he took over the magazine. However, he became increasingly critical of the New Left and gradually moved rightward as the 1960s wore on. By the 1970s, he was a leading member of the neoconservative movement.

=== Iraq War ===
In the lead-up to the 2003 U.S. invasion of Iraq, Podhoretz argued strongly for military intervention, claiming that Saddam Hussein posed a direct threat to the United States. After the 9/11 attack and more than a year before the start of the War in Iraq, Podhoretz wrote in February 2002 that "There is no doubt that Saddam already possesses large stores of chemical and biological weapons, and may ... be 'on the precipice of nuclear power.' ... Some urge that we ... concentrate on easier targets first. Others contend that the longer we wait, the more dangerous Saddam will grow. Yet whether or not Iraq becomes the second front in the war against terrorism, one thing is certain: there can be no victory in this war if it ends with Saddam Hussein still in power."

=== Iranian nuclear program ===
In 2007, Podhoretz argued that the United States should attack Iranian nuclear facilities. According to The Sunday Times, Podhoretz believed that "Iraq, Afghanistan and Iran are merely different fronts of the same long war." Podhoretz described diplomatic efforts with Iran as similar to appeasement of Nazi Germany prior to World War II. He also contended that the war on terror is a war against Islamofascism, and constitutes World War IV (World War III having been the Cold War), and advocated the bombing of Iran to preempt Iranian acquisition of nuclear weapons. His book on that subject, entitled World War IV: The Long Struggle Against Islamofascism, was published by Doubleday on September 11, 2007.

In a 2007 column, Podhoretz explicitly stated his view that Iran should be attacked: "In short, the plain and brutal truth is that if Iran is to be prevented from developing a nuclear arsenal, there is no alternative to the actual use of military force—any more than there was an alternative to force if Hitler was to be stopped in 1938."

=== Vietnam War ===
In an editorial to The Wall Street Journal on the sixth anniversary of the September 11 attacks, Podhoretz contended that the retreat from Iraq should not be similar to the retreat from South Vietnam. He argued that when the U.S. withdrew from Vietnam, it sacrificed its national honor.

In 1982, James Fallows wrote a review of Podhoretz's book, Why We Were in Vietnam, for The New York Times, in which he accused Podhoretz of "changing his views" and "self-righteousness" on the subject of Vietnam, noting that in 1971 Podhoretz wrote that he would "prefer just such an American defeat to a 'Vietnamization' of the war."

The longer passage from which the 1971 quote comes is as follows:

As one who has never believed that anything good would ever come for us or for the world from an unambiguous American defeat, I now find myself – and here is the main source of my own embarrassment in writing about Vietnam – unhappily moving to the side of those who would prefer just such an American defeat to a 'Vietnamization' of the war which calls for the indefinite and unlimited bombardment by American pilots in American planes of every country in that already devastated region.

=== Soviet Union ===
In the early 1980s, Podhoretz was extremely skeptical that fundamental reform was possible in the USSR, and sharply criticized those who argued that U.S. policy toward the Soviet Union should be one of détente. In his 1980 book The Present Danger, Podhoretz predicted that the United States was in danger of losing the Cold War and falling behind the Soviet Union as a global power. Later he would express anger with President Ronald Reagan for "not establishing sufficiently strong policies toward the Soviets."

=== George W. Bush administration ===
Podhoretz praised Bush, calling him "a man who knows evil when he sees it and who has demonstrated an unfailingly courageous willingness to endure vilification and contumely in setting his face against it." He called Bush the president who was "battered more mercilessly and with less justification than any other in living memory."

=== Sarah Palin ===
In a 2010 Wall Street Journal opinion piece titled "In Defense of Sarah Palin", Podhoretz wrote, "I hereby declare that I would rather be ruled by the Tea Party than by the Democratic Party, and I would rather have Sarah Palin sitting in the Oval Office than Barack Obama."

=== Donald Trump presidency ===
Podhoretz, who initially supported Marco Rubio in the 2016 Republican primaries, remarked about the primary campaign:

"I began to be bothered by the hatred that was building up against Trump from my soon to be new set of ex-friends. It really disgusted me. I just thought it had no objective correlative... They called them dishonorable, or opportunists, or cowards—and this was done by people like Bret Stephens, Bill Kristol, and various others. And I took offense at that. So that inclined me to what I then became: anti-anti-Trump. By the time he finally won the nomination, I was sliding into a pro-Trump position, which has grown stronger and more passionate as time has gone on.

Podhoretz said his views however, have caused him to lose ex-friends who were anti-Trump, saying: "Well some of them have gone so far as to make me wonder whether they've lost their minds altogether." Of Trump, he argues: "[T]he fact that Trump was elected is a kind of miracle. I now believe he's an unworthy vessel chosen by God to save us from the evil on the Left... His virtues are the virtues of the street kids of Brooklyn. You don't back away from a fight and you fight to win. That's one of the things that the Americans who love him, love him for—that he's willing to fight, not willing but eager to fight. And that's the main virtue and all the rest stem from, as [Thomas] Klingenstein says, his love of America. I mean, Trump loves America."

=== Abortion ===
In 1988, Podhoretz wrote, "I have recently found myself sliding toward the pro-life camp" because of the potential abuses of terminating less than perfect babies and using babies as a resource for harvesting organs. He went on to write, "I predict that the line between legalized abortion and legitimation of infanticide is going to disappear."

=== Gay-rights movement ===
In his 1996 Commentary magazine piece "How the Gay-Rights Movement Won", Podhoretz views homosexuality as a "self-evident" "perversion", asserting that it is politics and not science that keeps homosexuality off the American Psychiatric Association's list of mental disorders.

Podhoretz stated that "my heart goes out to all [gay men] ... because the life they live is not as good as the life available to men who make their beds with women." He went on to declare, "I for one will go on withholding my assent from this triumphant march" of the gay rights movement.

He concluded that what is at stake are "the fundamental realities of life against the terrible distortions that have been introduced ... by the gay-rights movement and its supporters".

Podhoretz's wife expressed an assenting perspective in her piece The Boys on the Beach which includes references to their family vacations on Fire Island, New York, an area with a large gay population.

John Podhoretz, Norman's son and successor as Commentary editor, announced in 2012 that he, himself, is no longer an opponent of gay marriage.

=== Immigration ===
Podhoretz said that he had formerly been unthinkingly pro-immigration "because I'm the child of immigrants. And I thought it was unseemly of me to oppose what not only had saved my life, but had given me the best life I think I could possibly have had." However, his views later changed: "In 1924, immigration virtually stopped and the rationale for the new policy was to give newcomers a chance to assimilate—which may or may not have been the main reason—but it probably worked. What has changed my mind about immigration now—even legal immigration—is that our culture has weakened to the point where it's no longer attractive enough for people to want to assimilate to, and we don't insist that they do assimilate. ... That was the culture of the prewar period. You certainly wanted your children to be Americans—real Americans."

== Books ==
External videos
- Booknotes interview with Podhoretz on Ex-Friends, March 28, 1999, C-SPAN
- Presentation by Podhoretz on Ex-Friends, February 22, 1999, C-SPAN
- Presentation by Podhoretz on My Love Affair with America, June 26, 2000, C-SPAN
- Presentation by Podhoretz on The Prophets, November 8, 2002, C-SPAN
- After Words interview with Podhoretz on World War IV, September 30, 2007, C-SPAN
- Presentation by Podhoretz on Why Are Jews Liberals?, September 10, 2009, C-SPAN
- Interview with Podhoretz on Why Are Jews Liberals?, November 15, 2009, C-SPAN
- Presentation by Podhoretz on Why Are Jews Liberals?, November 15, 2009, C-SPAN
- Interview with Norman Podhoretz conducted by John Podhoretz on Making It, April 5, 2017, C-SPAN

- 1963: Hannah Arendt on Eichmann: A Study in the Perversity of Brilliance. New York: American Jewish Committee
- 1963: My Negro Problem and Ours. New York: American Jewish Committee
- 1964: Doings and Undoings: The Fifties and After in American Writing. New York, Farrar, Straus (collection of essays)
- 1966: The Commentary Reader: Two Decades of Articles and Stories. New York, Atheneum editor (collection of essays).
- 1967: Making It. New York, Random House (autobiography) ISBN 0-394-43449-8
- 1967: Jewishness and the Younger Intellectuals: A Symposium Reprinted from Commentary, a Journal of Significant Thought and Opinion on Jewish Affairs and Contemporary Issues. New York: American Jewish Committee introduction)
- 1979: Breaking Ranks: A Political Memoir. New York: Harper & Row,
- 1980: The Present Danger: "Do We Have the Will to Reverse the Decline of American Power?". New York: Simon & Schuster, ISBN 0-671-41395-3
- 1981: The New Defenders of Capitalism. Washington, D.C. : Ethics and Public Policy Center
- 1982: Why We Were in Vietnam. New York : Simon & Schuster ISBN 0-671-44578-2
- 1982: Congressional Policy: A Guide to American Foreign Policy and National Defense. Washington, D.C. : National Center for Legislative Research
- 1983: The Present and Future Danger: Thoughts on Soviet/American Foreign Policy. Washington, D.C.: National Center for Legislative Research
- 1984: State of World Jewry Address, 1983. New York : 92nd Street Y
- 1986: Terrorism – Reagan's Response. Coral Gables, Florida : The North-South Center, University of Miami, Working Paper, Soviet and East European Studies Program (transcript of a debate with Charles W. Maynes, Jiri Valenta)
- 1986: The Bloody Crossroads: Where Literature and Politics Meet (collection of essays). New York : Simon & Schuster ISBN 0-671-61891-1
- 1989: Israel: A Lamentation From the Future. Dollard-des-Ormeaux, Quebec: Dawn Publishing Company
- 1999: Ex-Friends: Falling Out With Allen Ginsberg, Lionel & Diana Trilling, Lillian Hellman, Hannah Arendt, and Norman Mailer. New York, Free Press, (memoir) ISBN 1-893554-17-1
- 2000: My Love Affair With America: The Cautionary Tale of a Cheerful Conservative (autobiography). New York: Free Press ISBN 1-893554-41-4
- 2002: The Prophets: Who They Were, What They Are. New York: Free Press ISBN 0-7432-1927-9
- 2003: The Norman Podhoretz Reader: A Selection of His Writings from the 1950s through the 1990s, ed. Thomas L. Jeffers with a foreword by Paul Johnson. New York: Free Press ISBN 0-7432-3661-0
- 2005: The Bush Doctrine: What the President Said and What It Means.^{[unfit]} Washington, D.C.: The Heritage Foundation
- 2007: World War IV: The Long Struggle Against Islamofascism. New York: Doubleday, ISBN 0-385-52221-5
- 2009: Why Are Jews Liberals?. New York: Doubleday, ISBN 0-385-52919-8

== See also ==
- Life Against Death
- Neoconservatism
