= A Bright Shining Lie (film) =

- Promotional poster
- Genre: War drama
- Based on: A Bright Shining Lie by Neil Sheehan
- Written by: Terry George
- Directed by: Terry George
- Starring: Bill Paxton; Amy Madigan; Vivian Wu; Donal Logue; Eric Bogosian; Kurtwood Smith
- Music by: Gary Chang
- Country of origin: United States
- Original language: English

Production
- Executive producer: Lois Bonfiglio
- Producer: Greg Ricketson
- Production locations: Lopburi, Thailand; Cirebon, Central Java, Indonesia
- Cinematography: Jack Conroy
- Editor: Nicholas Beauman
- Running time: 118 minutes
- Production companies: HBO Pictures; Bleecker Street Films
- Budget: $14 million

Original release
- Network: HBO
- Release: May 30, 1998

A Bright Shining Lie is a 1998 American war drama television film written and directed by Terry George, based on Neil Sheehan's 1988 book about the true story of John Paul Vann's experience in the Vietnam War. It stars Bill Paxton, Amy Madigan, Vivian Wu, Donal Logue, Eric Bogosian and Kurtwood Smith. It aired on HBO on May 30, 1998.

== Cast ==
- Bill Paxton as Lieutenant Colonel John Paul Vann
- Karina Logue as Barmaid
- Amy Madigan as Mary Jane Vann
- Donal Logue as Steven Burnett
- Harve Presnell as General Paul Harkins
- Robert John Burke as Frank Drummond
- Bill Whelan as Ron Dray
- Lim Kay Tong as Colonel Cao Huynh Van
- Seng Kawee as VC Leader
- Vivian Wu as Lee
- Van Thoa Trinh as VC Commander
- Richard Libertini as Marriage Counselor
- James Bigwood as Office Manager
- Ed Lauter as General Weyand
- Kurtwood Smith as General Westmoreland
- Eric Bogosian as Doug Elders, a composite character not in the book melding elements of real-life people in the book, Daniel Ellsberg and Douglas Ramsey, who both worked with Vann; Ellsberg and reporter David Halberstam had asked that their names be removed from the production after reading an early draft of the screenplay
- James Rebhorn as Ambassador Bunker
- Les J.N. Mau as Colonel Dinh
- David Warshofsky as Terry Pike
- Thanh Nguyen as ARVN Translator
- Pichariva Narakbunchai as Annie
- Kris von Habsburg as a US Soldier
- Matthew Ascherl, Simon Gaut and Jamie Watts (American GI's), featured in opening scene(s) at airfield

== Award nominations ==
In 1998, the film was nominated for a Primetime Emmy Award for Outstanding Made for Television Movie. In 1999, Bill Paxton was nominated for a Golden Globe Award for his performance in the film.
