= John Paul Vann =

United States Army lieutenant colonel (1924–1972)

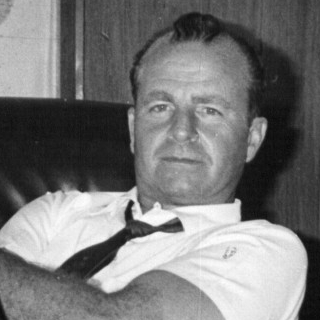
- Born: John Paul Tripp; July 2, 1924; Norfolk, Virginia, U.S.
- Died: June 9, 1972 (aged 47); Kon Tum, South Vietnam
- Burial place: Arlington National Cemetery
- Alma mater: Rutgers University (BS); Syracuse University (MBA)
- Military career
- Allegiance: United States
- Branch: United States Army Air Forces; United States Army
- Service years: 1943–1963
- Rank: Lieutenant Colonel
- Conflicts: World War II; Korean War; Vietnam War
- Awards: Army Distinguished Service Cross; Distinguished Flying Cross; Bronze Star Medal (2); Army Commendation Medal (2); Purple Heart

John Paul Vann (born John Paul Tripp; July 2, 1924 – June 9, 1972) was a lieutenant colonel in the United States Army, later retired, who became well known for his role in the Vietnam War. Although separated from the military before the Vietnam War reached its peak, he returned to service as a civilian under the auspices of the United States Agency for International Development and by the waning days of the war was the first American civilian to command troops in regular combat there. He received the Presidential Medal of Freedom and was the only civilian in Vietnam to receive the Distinguished Service Cross. He died on June 9, 1972, in a helicopter crash in Vietnam just after the Battle of Kontum.

== Early life ==
Born John Paul Tripp in Norfolk, Virginia, on July 2, 1924, out of wedlock, to John Spry and Myrtle Lee Tripp. Vann's mother married Aaron Frank Vann, and Vann took his stepfather's surname. Vann had three half-siblings and in 1942 Aaron Vann officially adopted him. Although the Vann children grew up in near poverty, Vann was able to attend boarding school at Ferrum College through the patronage of a wealthy member of his church. He graduated from its high school in 1941, and from its junior college program in 1943. With the onset of World War II, Vann sought to become an aviator/pilot.

== Military career ==
In 1943, at the age of 18, Vann enlisted in the United States Army Air Force. He underwent pilot training, transferred to navigation school, and was commissioned as a second lieutenant in 1945. However, the war ended before he could see action.

When the Army Air Force separated from the Army in 1947 to form its own branch, the United States Air Force, Vann chose to remain in the Army and transferred to the infantry. He was assigned to Korea, and then Japan, as a logistics officer. When the Korean War began in June 1950, Vann coordinated the transportation of his 25th Infantry Division to Korea. Vann joined his unit, which was placed on the critical Pusan Perimeter until the amphibious Inchon landing relieved the beleaguered forces.

In late 1950, in the wake of China's entrance into the war and the retreat of allied forces, then-Captain Vann was given his first command, a Ranger company, the Eighth Army Ranger Company. He led the unit on reconnaissance missions behind enemy lines for three months, before a serious illness in one of his children resulted in his transfer back to the United States. While assigned to Rutgers University's ROTC program as an assistant professor of military science and tactics, he received a Bachelor of Science degree with a concentration in economics and statistics in 1954.

In 1954, Vann joined the 16th Infantry Regiment in Schweinfurt, Germany, becoming the head of the regiment's heavy mortar company. A year later, he was promoted to major and transferred to Headquarters U.S. Army Europe at Heidelberg, where he returned to logistics work.

Vann returned to the U.S. to attend the Command and General Staff College (a prerequisite for further promotion) in 1957. During this period, he earned a Master of Business Administration degree from Syracuse University in 1959 and completed all course requirements for a PhD in public administration at the university's Maxwell School of Citizenship and Public Affairs. He was promoted to lieutenant colonel in 1961.

=== Vietnam War service ===
Vann was voluntarily assigned to South Vietnam in 1962 as an adviser to Colonel Huỳnh Văn Cao, commander of the ARVN IV Corps.

In the final check to board Flying Tiger Line Flight 739, Vann was detained since his passport was found to have expired. The plane took off and later crashed en route after leaving Guam with no survivors. Taking a later flight, he arrived on March 23, 1962.

In the thick of the anti-guerrilla war against the Viet Cong, Vann became concerned with the way in which the war was being prosecuted, in particular the disastrous Battle of Ap Bac. Directing the battle from a spotter plane overhead, he earned the Distinguished Flying Cross for his bravery in taking enemy fire. He attempted to draw public attention to the problems through reporters such as David Halberstam of the New York Times and Neil Sheehan of UPI, directing much of his ire towards MACV commander General Paul D. Harkins. Vann completed his Vietnam assignment in March 1963 and left the Army within a few months, having completed 20 years of service.

== Civilian career ==
Vann accepted a job in Denver, Colorado with defense contractor Martin Marietta. Although he succeeded there for nearly two years, he missed Vietnam and angled to return. Vann returned to Vietnam in March 1965 as an official of the Agency for International Development (AID).

After an assignment as province senior adviser, Vann was made Deputy for Civil Operations and Rural Development Support (CORDS) in the Third Corps Tactical Zone of Vietnam, which consisted of the twelve provinces north and west of Saigon—the part of South Vietnam most important to the US. CORDS was an integrated group that consisted of USAID, U.S. Information Service, Central Intelligence Agency and State Department along with U.S. Army personnel to provide needed manpower. Among other undertakings, CORDS was responsible for the Phoenix Program, which involved "neutralization" of the Viet Cong infrastructure.

Vann served as Deputy for Civil Operations and Rural Development Support CORDS III (i.e., commander of all civilian and military advisers in the Third Corps Tactical Zone) until November 1968 when he was assigned to the same position in IV Corps, which consisted of the provinces south of Saigon in the Mekong Delta.

Vann was highly respected by a large segment of officers and civilians who were involved in the broader political aspects of the war because he favored small units performing aggressive patrolling instead of grandiose engagements by large units. Unlike many US soldiers, he was respectful toward the ARVN soldiers notwithstanding their low morale and was committed to training and strengthening their morale and commitment. He encouraged his personnel to engage themselves in Vietnamese society as much as possible and he constantly briefed that the Vietnam War must be envisaged as a long war at a lower level of engagement rather than a short war at a big-unit, high level of engagement.

On one of his trips back to the U.S. in December 1967, Vann was asked by Walt Rostow, an advocate of more troops and Johnson administration National Security Advisor, whether the U.S. would be over the worst of the war in six months: "Oh hell no, Mr. Rostow", replied Vann, "I'm a born optimist. I think we can hold out longer than that." Vann's wit and iconoclasm did not endear him to many military and civilian careerists but he was a hero to many young civilian and military officers who understood the limits of conventional warfare in the irregular environment of Vietnam.

After his assignment to IV Corps, Vann was assigned as the senior American advisor in II Corps Military Region in the early 1970s when American involvement in the war was winding down and troops were being withdrawn. For that reason, his new job put him in charge of all United States personnel in his region, where he advised the ARVN (Army of the Republic of Vietnam) commander to the region and became the first American civilian to command U.S. regular troops in combat. His position was the equivalent in responsibilities of a major general in the US Army.

== Personal life ==
Vann married Mary Jane Allen of Rochester, New York in October 1945, at the age of 21. They had five children.

== Death ==
Three days after the Battle of Kontum, Vann was killed when his helicopter crashed into a grove of trees near a village cemetery. He was 47 years old. He was buried on June 16, 1972, in Section 11 of Arlington National Cemetery. His funeral was attended by General William Westmoreland, Major General Edward Lansdale, Lieutenant Colonel Lucien Conein, Senator Edward Kennedy, and Daniel Ellsberg.

== Legacy ==
On June 18, President Richard Nixon posthumously awarded Vann the Presidential Medal of Freedom, the nation's highest civilian citation, for his ten years of service in South Vietnam. For his actions from April 23–24, 1972, Vann, ineligible for the Medal of Honor as a civilian, was also awarded (posthumously) the Distinguished Service Cross, the only civilian so honored since World War II.

Neil Sheehan wrote a Pulitzer Prize-winning Vietnam history and biography of Vann, A Bright Shining Lie: John Paul Vann and America in Vietnam, in which Sheehan also examines two of Vann's alleged career-stunting incidents involving morals charges during his service in West Germany and at Fort Leavenworth, Kansas, and how these possibly affected Vann's future actions and resulting career path both in and after Vietnam. In 1998, HBO made the film A Bright Shining Lie, adapted from the book, with Bill Paxton playing the role of Vann.

== Quotes ==
- "It was a miserable damn performance." (speaking of the Battle of Ap Bac)
- "If it were not for the fact that Vietnam is but a pawn in the larger East-West confrontation, and that our presence here is essential to deny the resources of this area to Communist China, then it would be damned hard to justify our support of the existing government."
- "This is a political war and it calls for discrimination in killing. The best weapon for killing would be a knife, but I'm afraid we can't do it that way. The worst is an airplane. The next worst is artillery. Barring a knife, the best is a rifle — you know who you're killing."
- "We don't have twelve years' experience in Vietnam. We have one year's experience twelve times over."
- "In one fell swoop [President Thieu's Land to the Tiller Program] eliminated tenancy in Vietnam. All rents were suspended."
- "The basic fact of life is that the overwhelming majority of the population — somewhere around 95 percent — prefer the government of Vietnam to a Communist government or the government that's being offered by the other side."
- "These people may be the world's greatest lovers but they're not the world's greatest fighters. But they're good people and they can win a war if someone shows them how." (speaking about the South Vietnamese)
- "That’s the best damn bombing I’ve seen in my 11 years over here!" (speaking about the South Vietnam Air Force pilots in Kontum 1972)
- "I will turn this into a burning Hell" speaking to MACV Team 36 advisor CPT RE McCall in February 1972 regarding the planned NVA offensive in Pleiku Province."
- ”Next time I’ll make goddam sure they’re old enough”, after narrowly avoiding court martial for statutory rape, December 1959.

== Awards ==
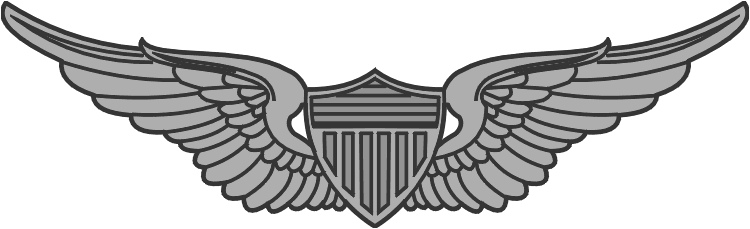
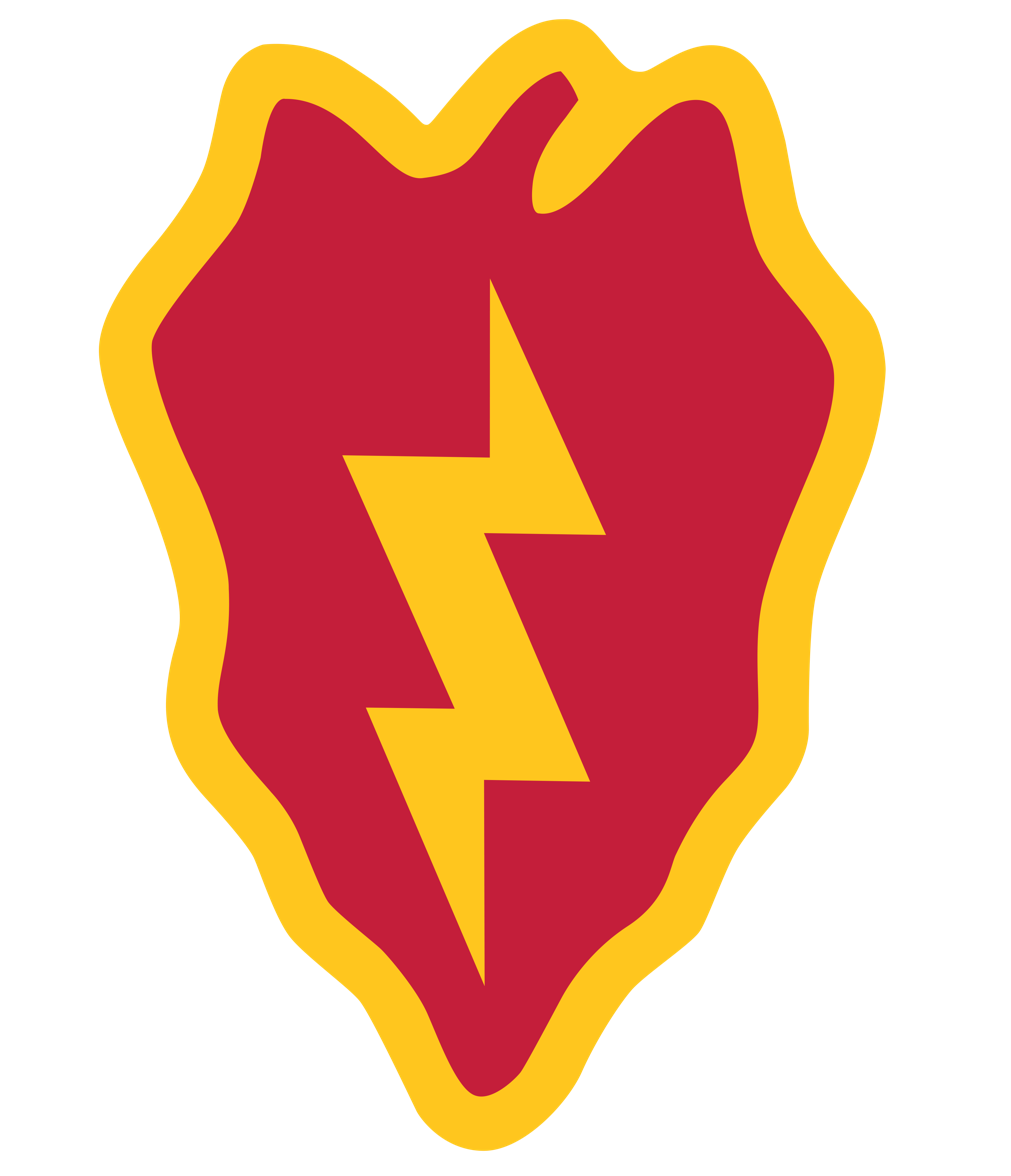
Combat Infantryman Badge
Basic Army Aviator Badge
Basic Parachutist Badge
25th Infantry Division Shoulder Sleeve Insignia

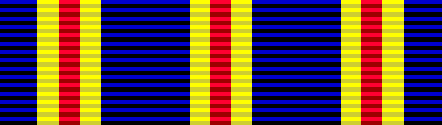
Army Distinguished Service Cross (posthumous)
Distinguished Flying Cross
Bronze Star Medal with one bronze oak leaf cluster
Army Commendation Medal with oak leaf cluster
Purple Heart
Presidential Medal of Freedom (posthumous)
Army Good Conduct Medal
American Campaign Medal
World War II Victory Medal
Army of Occupation Medal with "Japan" clasp
National Defense Service Medal with one bronze service star
Korean Service Medal with four service stars
Vietnam Service Medal with service star
Vietnam Civilian Service Award
Vietnam Gallantry Cross with palm
Korean Presidential Unit Citation
United Nations Korea Medal
Korean War Service Medal (posthumous)
Vietnam Campaign Medal

== Dates of rank ==
- Enlisted – 10 March 1943
- 2nd Lieutenant – 10 February 1945
- 1st Lieutenant – 17 April 1947
- Captain – 13 September 1950
- Major – 19 April 1955
- Lieutenant Colonel – 26 May 1961

== See also ==
- Robert Komer
- Neil Sheehan
- A Bright Shining Lie
- Tran Ngoc Chau

== Sources ==
- Sheehan, Neil (1988). A Bright Shining Lie: John Paul Vann and America in Vietnam. New York: Random House.
