= A Bright Shining Lie =

1988 nonfiction book by Neil Sheehan

- First edition
- Author: Neil Sheehan
- Language: English
- Subject: Vietnam War
- Publisher: Random House
- Publication date: 1988
- Media type: Print (hardcover and paperback)
- Pages: 880
- ISBN: 978-0394484471

A Bright Shining Lie: John Paul Vann and America in Vietnam (1988) is a book by Neil Sheehan, a former New York Times reporter, about U.S. Army lieutenant colonel John Paul Vann (killed in action) and the United States' involvement in the Vietnam War.

Sheehan was awarded the 1988 National Book Award for Nonfiction and the 1989 Pulitzer Prize for General Nonfiction for the book. It was adapted as a film of the same name released by HBO in 1998, starring Bill Paxton and Amy Madigan.

== Summary ==
John Paul Vann became an adviser to the Army of the Republic of Vietnam in 1962. He was an ardent critic of how the war was fought by the government of South Vietnam, which he viewed as corrupt and incompetent, and increasingly, on the part of the U.S. military. He was critical of the U.S. military command, especially under Paul Harkins and its inability to adapt to the fact that it was facing a popular guerrilla movement while backing a corrupt regime. He argued that many of the tactics employed (for example the Strategic Hamlet Program of relocation) further alienated the population and were counterproductive to U.S. objectives. He was often unable to influence the military command but used the Saigon press corps including Sheehan, David Halberstam and Malcolm Browne to disseminate his views.

The prologue recounts Vann's funeral on June 16, 1972, after his death in a helicopter crash in Vietnam. Sheehan, a friend, had attended the funeral. The subsequent account is divided into seven "books" detailing Vann's career in Vietnam and America's involvement in the conflict.

- Book I tells of Vann's assignment to Vietnam in 1962.
- Book II "The Antecedents to a Confrontation" tells of the origin of the Vietnam War.
- Book III gives a detailed account of the shambolic Battle of Ap Bac on January 2, 1963, in which the South Vietnamese army suffered a humiliating defeat at the hands of the Viet Cong.
- Book IV details Vann's criticism of the way the war was being fought, his conflict with the U.S. military command and his retirement from the Army in mid-1963.
- Book V tracks back to give Vann's personal history before his involvement in the war, explaining how his career path to becoming a general officer was likely truncated by serial adulteries and the statutory rape of an Army chaplain's 15-year-old daughter.
- Books VI and VII give an account of Vann's return to Vietnam in 1965 as an official of the Agency for International Development and his doomed attempt to implement a winning strategy for the U.S. Army and how he eventually compromised with the military system he once criticized.

Sheehan describes Vann as having led more American troops in direct combat than any other civilian in US history. Vann had retired from the Army by then.

== Reception and influence ==
According to The New York Times Book Review, "If there is one book that captures the Vietnam war in the sheer Homeric scale of its passion and folly, this book is it. Neil Sheehan orchestrates a great fugue evoking all the elements of the war". The New York Review of Books proclaimed it "an unforgettable narrative, a chronicle grand enough to suit the crash and clangors of whole armies. A Bright Shining Lie is a very great piece of work; its rewards are aesthetic and [...] almost spiritual".

The book received the Robert F. Kennedy Center for Justice and Human Rights 1989 Book Award given annually to a book that "most faithfully and forcefully reflects Robert Kennedy's purposes – his concern for the poor and the powerless, his struggle for honest and even-handed justice, his conviction that a decent society must assure all young people a fair chance, and his faith that a free democracy can act to remedy disparities of power and opportunity."

In September 1988, Sheehan was interviewed by Brian Lamb about A Bright Shining Lie. The discussion was aired on C-SPAN in five 30-minute segments and was the basis for the later C-SPAN show Booknotes.

== Bibliography ==
- Neil Sheehan (1988). A Bright Shining Lie: John Paul Vann and America in Vietnam. New York, Random House.
