= Paul D. Harkins =

United States Army general

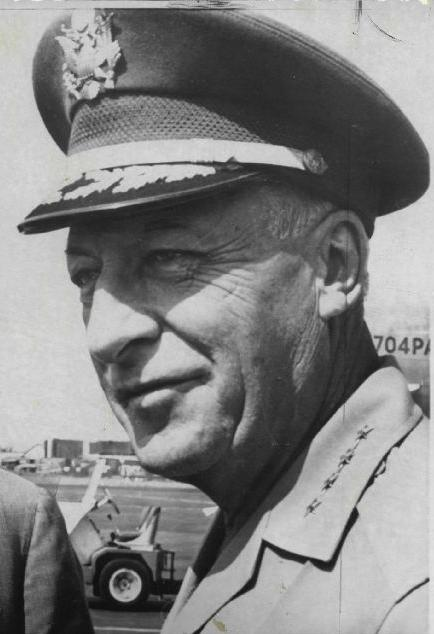
- Born: Paul Donal Harkins; 15 May 1904; Boston, Massachusetts, US
- Died: 21 August 1984 (aged 80); Dallas, Texas, US
- Burial place: West Point Cemetery
- Military career
- Allegiance: United States
- Branch: United States Army
- Service years: 1929–1964
- Rank: General
- Nickname: Ramrod
- Commands: F Troop, 3rd Cavalry Regiment; Commandant of Cadets, United States Military Academy; 45th Infantry Division; 24th Infantry Division; Allied Land Forces, South East Europe; Military Assistance Command, Vietnam
- Conflicts: World War II; Korean War; Vietnam War
- Awards: Army Distinguished Service Medal (3); Legion of Merit; Bronze Star (2)

Paul Donal Harkins (15 May 1904 – 21 August 1984) was a career officer in the United States Army and attained the rank of general. He is most notable for having served during World War II as deputy chief of staff for operations in George S. Patton Jr.'s commands, and as the first Military Assistance Command, Vietnam (MACV) commander, a post he held from 1962 to 1964.

== Early life ==
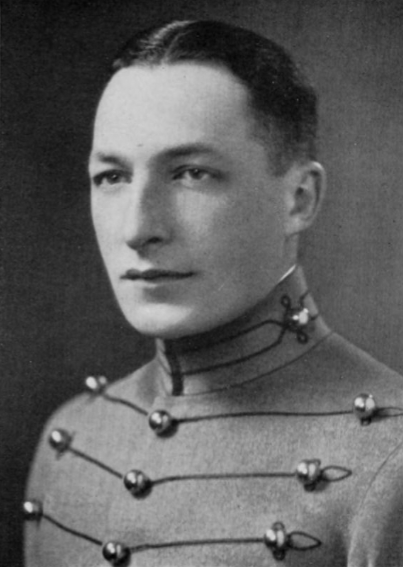
As a West Point cadet

Harkins was born in Boston, Massachusetts on 15 May 1904, the second of five children of newspaper editor Edward Francis Harkins and May E. Kelly. He decided early on a military career, and enlisted in the Massachusetts National Guard's 110th Cavalry Regiment in 1922, rising to the rank of sergeant and learning skills including horseback riding and polo. While in the National Guard, he took a competitive exam for an appointment to the United States Military Academy and received an appointment, becoming a cadet in 1925. While at West Point, Harkins continued to play polo, becoming captain of the team. He graduated in 1929 and was assigned to the cavalry branch.

== Career ==
=== Initial assignments ===
Assigned initially to the 7th Cavalry Regiment at Fort Bliss, Harkins continued to hone his horsemanship and play polo. In 1933, he completed the Cavalry School's equitation course at Fort Riley, after which he remained there for several years as an instructor. Beginning in 1939, he commanded F Troop, 3rd Cavalry Regiment at Fort Myer, serving under regimental commander George S. Patton Jr. In 1941, he graduated from the United States Army Command and General Staff College.

=== World War II ===
Third US Army staff, Harkins right rear

During the period immediately prior to U.S. entry into World War II, Harkins participated in large-scale exercises, including the Louisiana and Pine Camp maneuvers. He then served with the 1st Cavalry Brigade at Fort Bliss.

In January 1942, Harkins was assigned to the 2nd Armored Division at Fort Benning, serving again under Patton, who was the division commander. In August 1942, Harkins became deputy chief of staff of Patton's Western Task Force, which was preparing for the invasion of North Africa. He took part in the assault landing at Fedhala Beach on November 8.

Harkins followed Patton when Patton became commander of the Seventh Army. As deputy chief of staff, Harkins played a major role in planning the Allied invasion of Sicily and in July 1943 he took part in the initial landings and combat at Gela.

Harkins was then named deputy chief of staff for Third Army, serving under Patton and chief of staff General Hobart R. Gay. While in that capacity, Harkins earned the nickname "Ramrod" for his determination to fulfill Patton's desire to always keep Third Army moving during combat in France. When asked by a fellow officer who asked him "how the devil our G.I.s can remain so cheerful at the front under these frightful conditions?" Harkins is said to have replied, "Well the Old Man knows that as long as they are winning and moving forward they will remain happy and their morale will be high".

Harkins was present with Patton at the famous command and staff meeting called by General Dwight D. Eisenhower to discuss the Allied response to the German attack in the Ardennes which became known as the Battle of the Bulge, in which Patton promised that Third Army could be ready to disengage his troops from their current eastward attack and move north approximately 100 miles (160 km) to counter-attack in three days. This maneuver seemed impossible to those who were present, but was successfully executed once Patton received the go-ahead.

Harkins remained in Germany after the war and took part in the occupation of Bavaria, transferring to Fifteenth Army when Patton was assigned as commander of that unit. Harkins escorted Mrs. Patton back to the United States following Patton's death in December 1945.

=== West Point cheating scandal ===
From 1946 to 1951, Harkins served as deputy Commandant of Cadets at West Point and then as commandant. On 2 April 1951, he was informed by a first class cadet that a classmate had told him that a group of cadets, mainly among the football team, were involved in an academic cheating ring.

Harkins had made it plain that he felt that the nationally ranked football team was not in line with his vision of the USMA. In a controversial decision, he asked cadets to gather information about the cheating. A formal inquiry was held and ninety cadets were dismissed from the academy. Some had not participated in the cheating, but knew of it and had not reported it, which was considered a breach of the Cadet Honor Code ("A cadet will not lie, cheat, steal, or tolerate those who do").

The head coach for Army at that time, Earl "Red" Blaik, felt that Harkins was "a black and white man with no shades of gray" and accused him of bias. Blaik's son was one of the cadets who knew of the cheating, but had not acted.

=== Korean War ===
In 1951, Harkins was to head the Plans Division of the Army staff's directorate of Operations and Training (G3) and in 1952 he was promoted to brigadier general. In April 1953, he was assigned as chief of staff for Eighth Army in South Korea, serving under commander Maxwell D. Taylor and receiving a promotion to major general. In December 1953, Harkins took command of the 45th Infantry Division. When the 45th returned to the United States, Harkins took command of the 24th Infantry Division.

In 1954, Harkins was again assigned to the Army G-3 directorate, this time working in the International Affairs division as Director of Military Assistance Advisory Groups which included activities and missions in 42 countries. In July 1956, he was assigned as the Army's deputy chief of staff for operations and training, G-3.

=== Post-Korean War ===
Harkins was promoted to lieutenant general in 1957 and assigned as commander of NATO's Allied Land Forces, Southeastern Europe, with headquarters in İzmir, Turkey. In addition to efforts to modernize NATO's communications infrastructure, Harkins also endeavored to improve relations between Turkey and Greece.

In 1960, Harkins went to Hawaii for assignment as deputy commander of US Army, Pacific. In April 1961, he was selected to command a joint task force deployed initially to Okinawa and then the Philippines in anticipation of deployment into Laos. Events in Laos did not require Harkins' task force to be used and he resumed his duties at USARPAC.

=== Vietnam ===
In January 1962, Harkins was promoted to general as commander of Military Assistance Command—Vietnam, the successor unit to Military Assistance Advisory Group—Vietnam; this change came as part of the initial U.S. troop buildup which escalated into the Vietnam War. Harkins appeared. on the cover of Time magazine, (What it Takes to Win, 11 May 1962), where he was described as "look(ing) every inch the professional soldier". The article detailed the commitment of the United States to stay in South Vietnam, even if it took a decade, quoting then Attorney General Robert F. Kennedy from November 1962, "We are going to win in Vietnam. We will remain until we do".

==== Controversy ====
At the beginning of his command of MACV, Harkins and his staff had repeatedly expressed optimism about the course of the war. Members of the U.S. press nicknamed him "General Blimp" (after the cartoon character Colonel Blimp) because of their belief that he inflated the success of U.S. and South Vietnamese military activities. As violence continued to escalate, many reporters began to perceive that what they were seeing in the field and being told confidentially by officers such as Lieutenant Colonel John Paul Vann did not match the information released by Harkins and his staff and they concluded that Harkins was either misinformed by his staff or untruthful. The Battle of Ap Bac in particular seriously affected many of the reporters' view of Harkins' credibility. When details of the battle emerged that differed from the Army's official version, it became a very serious matter, and press reports of it embarrassed the Kennedy administration.

Harkins was described by Neil Sheehan as an "American General with a swagger stick and cigarette holder...who would not deign to soil his suntans and street shoes in a rice paddy to find out what was going on was prattling about having trapped the Viet Cong". ("Suntans" was the nickname for the Army's khaki-colored tropical uniform.) New York Times Vietnam correspondent David Halberstam became so angry with Harkins he refused to shake his hand at a Fourth of July celebration, hosted at the US Embassy, Saigon. When the hosts called for a toast to Harkins, Halberstam shouted "Paul D. Harkins should be court-martialed and shot!", in contrast to his compatriots, who complied with the toast.

Harkins told a Saigon social gathering that he was going to "get" USAID official Rufus Phillips after Phillips truthfully reported on Viet Cong advances to President Kennedy in September 1963.

Mark Moyar, an associate professor at the U.S. Marine Corps University has argued that Halberstam and Sheehan, along with other reporters, "horribly tarnished the reputations of some very fine Americans, including General Harkins". Moyar writes that others, such as John Mecklin (then on leave from Time as Public Affairs officer for the US embassy) observed Harkins living a "Spartan" life in Saigon and traveling "daily" by small plane around the country to gather and evaluate information from South Vietnamese and American troops. Moyar observes that, while Harkins was not a "creative or brilliant strategist", he was a "superb motivational and technical coach, which was what the situation most demanded".

Time magazine correspondent Lee Griggs and Mecklin parodied the general in song at one time for saying the war was "well in hand". Sung to the tune of the Christian hymn "Jesus Loves Me", the verse went:

We are winning, this I know, General Harkins tells me so.
In the mountains, things are rough,
In the Delta, mighty tough,
But the V.C. will soon go, General Harkins tells me so.

Griggs recalls the General overheard this and "did not smile".

As he described in a later interview with historian Michael MacLear, when General William Westmoreland replaced Harkins in 1964, Westmoreland recalled that he got varying readings on the situation from Harkins, whose favorite poet was Kipling; when veering from optimism to pessimism Harkins would "constantly" quote a version of line from a Kipling poem for him:

The end of the fight is a tombstone white
With the name of the late deceased.
And the epitaph drear, a fool lies here
Who tried to hustle the East.

Said Westmoreland: "I'm very fond of Kipling because he's a soldier's poet," but he confessed, "I didn't take it quite to heart." The reason given by MacLear being that neither Kipling nor even MacArthur – no one in the history of war – had ever known the mobility and firepower that Westmoreland had been promised by Secretary of Defense McNamara, and was shortly to command.

In April 1964 Johnson had rejected junta leader General Nguyễn Khánh's request to allow Harkins to stay on as MACV chief. The following month Johnson announced that Harkins would be returning to the United States before his tenure was up. Harkins left Saigon for Washington, D.C., on 20 June 1964. After receiving a medal from the president, he retired to obscurity. As had occurred with former MAAG chief Lionel C. McGarr, whom Washington officials had ignored when he returned to the United States in 1962, McNamara had no desire to consult with Harkins, whom he felt had failed.

When Harkins left in June 1964, there were between 11,200 and 16,000 U.S. troops in Vietnam. Johnson raised the levels to 500,000 men under Westmoreland by 1968.

== Retirement ==
Harkins retired after returning from Vietnam, and was an advisor for the American Security Council Foundation. He and his wife later resided in Dallas, Texas, where he studied art and became an accomplished painter.

Book cover When the Third Cracked Europe: The Story of Patton's Incredible Army

Harkins wrote a book on General George S. Patton Jr. and the Third Army, 1969's When the Third Cracked Europe: The Story of Patton's Incredible Army. Harkins was also a technical consultant for the 1970 film Patton, and was portrayed by actor Lee Patterson in the made-for-TV sequel The Last Days of Patton, broadcast the year after his death.

== Death and burial ==
Harkins died in Dallas on 21 August 1984. He is buried at the United States Military Academy Post Cemetery in West Point, Orange County, New York, in Section IX, Row A, Grave 053.

== Family ==
In 1933, Harkins married Elizabeth Mae Conner. They were the parents of a daughter, Virginia. Virginia Harkins married West Point graduate Leslie D. Carter Jr., the son of Major General Leslie D. Carter.

== Awards ==
Note – not a complete list

U.S. decorations and awards

Distinguished Service Medal with two bronze oak leaf clusters
Legion of Merit
Bronze Star Medal with V device and one bronze oak leaf cluster
Air Medal with three bronze oak leaf clusters
American Defense Service Medal
American Campaign Medal
European-African-Middle Eastern Campaign Medal with one silver and three bronze campaign stars
World War II Victory Medal
Army of Occupation Medal with 'Germany' clasp
National Defense Service Medal with bronze service star
Korean Service Medal with two bronze campaign stars
Vietnam Service Medal with bronze campaign star

Foreign decorations and awards

Order of the Patriotic War Second Class (Union of Soviet Socialist Republics)
Republic of Korea Presidential Unit Citation
United Nations Service Medal
Republic of Vietnam Campaign Medal with 1960–device
Korean War Service Medal

In addition, he received foreign decorations from Belgium, France, Luxembourg and South Korea.

Military offices
Preceded by Command created	Commander, Military Assistance Command, Vietnam; 1962–1964	Succeeded by William Westmoreland
