= Neil Sheehan =

American journalist (1936–2021)

- Born: Cornelius Mahoney Sheehan; October 27, 1936; Holyoke, Massachusetts, U.S.
- Died: January 7, 2021 (aged 84); Washington, D.C., U.S.
- Education: Harvard University
- Occupation: Journalist

Cornelius Mahoney Sheehan (October 27, 1936 – January 7, 2021) was an American journalist. As a reporter for The New York Times in 1971, Sheehan obtained the classified Pentagon Papers from Daniel Ellsberg. His series of articles revealed a secret United States Department of Defense history of the Vietnam War and led to a U.S. Supreme Court case, New York Times Co. v. United States, 403 U.S. 713 (1971), which invalidated the United States government's use of a restraining order to halt publication.

He received a Pulitzer Prize and a National Book Award for his 1988 book A Bright Shining Lie, about the life of Lieutenant Colonel John Paul Vann and the United States involvement in the Vietnam War.

== Early life ==
Sheehan was born in Holyoke, Massachusetts on October 27, 1936. His father, Cornelius Joseph Sheehan, worked as a dairy farmer; his mother, Mary (O'Shea), was a housewife. Both immigrated to the United States from Ireland. He was raised on a dairy farm near Holyoke. Sheehan graduated from Mount Hermon School (later Northfield Mount Hermon) and Harvard University with a B.A. in history (cum laude) in 1958. He served in the U.S. Army from 1959 to 1962, when he was assigned to Korea and then transferred to Tokyo; there, he did work moonlighting in the Tokyo bureau of United Press International (UPI).

== Career ==
Following his discharge, Sheehan spent two years covering the war in Vietnam as UPI's Saigon bureau chief. In 1963, during the Buddhist crisis, Sheehan and David Halberstam debunked the claim by the Ngô Đình Diệm regime that the Army of the Republic of Vietnam regular forces had perpetrated the Xá Lợi Pagoda raids, which U.S. authorities initially accepted. They showed instead that the raiders were Special Forces loyal to Diệm's brother, Nhu out to frame the army generals. In 1964, he joined The New York Times and worked the city desk for a while before returning to the Far East, first to Indonesia and then to spend another year in Vietnam. Sheehan was one of numerous U.S. and international journalists who received valuable information from Pham Xuan An, a 20-year veteran correspondent for Time Magazine and Reuters, later revealed to also be a spy for the National Liberation Front for South Vietnam.

In the fall of 1966, he became the Pentagon correspondent. Two years later, he began reporting on the White House. He was a correspondent on political, diplomatic, and military affairs. After being notified of their existence by Marcus Raskin and Ralph Stavins at the Institute for Policy Studies, Sheehan copied the Pentagon Papers for the Times on March 2, 1971, against leaker and Vietnam-era acquaintance Daniel Ellsberg's wishes. He made the copies with the help of his wife Susan in numerous copy shops in Boston, then they flew with the copies to a hotel room at The Jefferson in Washington for reading, before mailing them to his editor James L. Greenfield's apartment, then he worked with Greenfield and a large team of editors, writers and lawyers on organizing the copies for publication in the New York Hilton Midtown, as he would later reveal in 2015. The U.S. government tried to halt publication and the case, New York Times Co. v. United States (403 U.S. 713), saw the U.S. Supreme Court reject the government's position and establish a landmark First Amendment decision. The exposé would earn The New York Times the Pulitzer Prize for Public Service.

In 1970, Sheehan reviewed Conversations With Americans by Mark Lane in the New York Times Book Review. He called the work a collection of Vietnam War crime stories with some obvious flaws which the author had not verified. Sheehan called for more thorough and scholarly work to be done on the war crimes being committed in Vietnam.

Sheehan published an article in the New York Times Book Review on March 28, 1971, entitled "Should We have War Crime Trials?". He suggested that the conduct of the Vietnam War could be a crime against humanity and that senior U.S. political and military leaders could be subject to trial. In response, the Pentagon prepared a detailed rebuttal justifying its conduct of the war and exonerating senior commanders, however, the rebuttal was never released due to the belief that it would only exacerbate the issue.

Sheehan published his first book, The Arnheiter Affair, in 1972. Marcus Aurelius Arnheiter, the subject of the book, proceeded to bring an action for libel against Sheehan but was ultimately unsuccessful. Sheehan then secured an unpaid leave from the Times to work on a book about John Paul Vann, a dramatic figure among American leaders in the early stages of the war in Vietnam. Two years later, in November 1974, Sheehan was badly injured in a road accident on a snowy mountain road in western Maryland. Sheehan's wife, the veteran New Yorker staff writer Susan Sheehan, chronicled details of the accident and its emotional, legal, and financial impact in a 1978 article for the magazine. The time and effort spent fighting three libel suits in connection with his first book that endured until 1979, and Sheehan's lengthy recovery from his injuries, delayed work on his Vietnam book. After the Times ended his unpaid leave in 1976, he formally resigned from the newspaper to continue work on the book.

Although he received an advance of $67,500 (of which he was entitled to $45,000 prior to publication) from Random House in 1972, Sheehan – a "dreadfully slow" writer who "[chased after] the last fact" – mainly subsisted on lecture fees and fellowships from the John Simon Guggenheim Memorial Foundation (1973–1974), the Adlai Stevenson Institute of International Studies at the University of Chicago (1973–1975), the Lehrman Institute (1975–1976), the Rockefeller Foundation (1976–1977), and the Woodrow Wilson International Center for Scholars (1979–1980) for the remainder of the 1970s. According to William Prochnau, the latter fellowship marked a significant "turning point" for the book, as Sheehan "talked about Vietnam all day long every day" with Peter Braestrup after abandoning several hundred manuscript pages later characterized as a "false start" by Susan Sheehan. When Sheehan finished "three-fifths of the manuscript" in the summer of 1981, the initial advance was renegotiated and raised to $200,000 with a projected delivery date of 1983, while William Shawn of The New Yorker agreed to excerpt the finished manuscript and advance funds as needed.

Still beset by health problems (including a pinched nerve and osteoarthritis), he eventually completed the book, A Bright Shining Lie: John Paul Vann and America in Vietnam, in 1986. Edited by Robert Loomis and published in 1988, it was nominated for the Pulitzer Prizes in Biography and History and received the Pulitzer Prize for General Nonfiction. It also won the National Book Award for Nonfiction. In 1990, Sheehan received the Golden Plate Award of the American Academy of Achievement.

== Later life ==
External videos
- Q&A interview with Sheehan on A Fiery Peace in a Cold War, September 20, 2009, C-SPAN

Sheehan released the book, After the War Was Over: Hanoi and Saigon, in 1992. It was inspired by his visit to Vietnam three years earlier. He published his last book, A Fiery Peace in a Cold War, in 2009. It detailed the story of Bernard Schriever, who was the father of the U.S. intercontinental ballistic missile system.

== Personal life ==
Sheehan was introduced to his wife, Susan Margulies, by fellow reporter Gay Talese. She wrote for The New Yorker at the time, and subsequently won the Pulitzer Prize for General Nonfiction for Is There No Place on Earth for Me? in 1983. They married in 1965, and had two daughters (Catherine and Maria). He is also survived by his two grandsons, Nicholas and Andrew.

Sheehan died on January 7, 2021, at his home in Washington, D.C. He was 84, and suffered from complications of Parkinson's disease in the time leading up to his death.

== Books ==
- The Pentagon Papers as published by the New York Times (1971), ISBN 9780552649179
- The Arnheiter Affair (1972) – about Marcus Aurelius Arnheiter, a U.S. Navy officer relieved of command in 1966
- A Bright Shining Lie: John Paul Vann and America in Vietnam (1988), ISBN 9781407063904
- After the War Was Over: Hanoi and Saigon (1992), ISBN 9780679745075
- A Fiery Peace in a Cold War: Bernard Schriever and the Ultimate Weapon (2009), ISBN 9780679745495

== In popular culture ==
Sheehan was portrayed by Jonas Chernick in The Pentagon Papers (2003), and Justin Swain in The Post (2017). He appears as himself in Ken Burns' 2017 documentary series The Vietnam War.
