= Tia Sáng =

Tia Sáng ('The Spark') may refer to:

- Tia Sáng (1991 magazine), a Vietnamese science and technology magazine
- Tia Sáng (1938 newspaper), a Vietnamese Trotskyist newspaper founded by the October group
