= The Vietnam War (TV series) =

2017 documentary television series

- Genre: Documentary
- Written by: Geoffrey C. Ward
- Directed by: Ken Burns; Lynn Novick
- Narrated by: Peter Coyote
- Composers: Trent Reznor; Atticus Ross
- Country of origin: United States
- Original languages: English; Vietnamese
- No. of episodes: 10

Production
- Producers: Sarah Botstein; Lynn Novick; Ken Burns
- Cinematography: Buddy Squires
- Editors: Tricia Reidy; Paul Barnes; Erik Ewers; Craig Mellish
- Running time: 1035 mins (17¼ hours)
- Production companies: Florentine Films; WETA; National Endowment for the Humanities
- Budget: $30 million

Original release
- Network: PBS
- Release: September 17 – September 28, 2017

The Vietnam War is a 10-part American television documentary series about the Vietnam War produced and directed by Ken Burns and Lynn Novick, written by Geoffrey C. Ward, and narrated by Peter Coyote. The first episode premiered on PBS on September 17, 2017. This series is one of the few PBS series to carry a TV-MA rating.

== Production ==
Ken Burns about the series. Video from the LBJ Library

The series cost around $30 million and took more than 10 years to make. It was produced by Ken Burns and Lynn Novick, who had previously collaborated on The War (2007), Baseball: The Tenth Inning (2010), and Prohibition (2011). The production companies were WETA-TV in Washington, D.C., and Burns' Florentine Films. It was funded in part by the National Endowment for the Humanities.

The series features interviews with 79 witnesses, including many Americans who fought in the war or opposed it as Anti-war protesters, as well as Vietnamese combatants and civilians from both the North and the South. Burns deliberately avoided "historians or other expert talking heads" and "onscreen interviews with polarizing boldfaced names like John Kerry, John McCain, Henry Kissinger and Jane Fonda." Instead, interviews were intended to provide a ground-up view of the War from the perspective of everyday people who lived through it. The third episode features an interview with retired UPI reporter Joseph L. Galloway, who was awarded a Bronze Star with "V" device for assisting with the wounded in the Battle of Ia Drang. Others interviewed include Vincent Okamoto, Karl Marlantes, and Tim O'Brien, author of The Things They Carried, a popular collection of linked short stories about the war.

The researchers for the film also accessed more than 24,000 photographs and examined 1,500 hours of archival footage. Within the series' 17-and-a-quarter-hours, there are scenes covering 25 battles, ten of which are detailed scenes documenting and describing the action from a number of perspectives.

== Episodes ==
No.	Title	Original release date	Running time
1	"Déjà Vu" (1858–1961)	September 17, 2017	1 hour 22 minutes (PBS)/55 minutes (BBC)
2	"Riding the Tiger" (1961–1963)	September 18, 2017	1 hour 24 minutes (PBS)/55 minutes (BBC)
3	"The River Styx (PBS)/Hell Come To Earth (BBC)" (January 1964 – December 1965)	September 19, 2017	1 hour 54 minutes (PBS)/55 minutes (BBC)
4	"Resolve (PBS)/Doubt (BBC)" (January 1966 – June 1967)	September 20, 2017	1 hour 54 minutes (PBS)/55 minutes (BBC)
5	"This Is What We Do" (July 1967 – December 1967)	September 21, 2017	1 hour 25 minutes (PBS)/55 minutes (BBC)
6	"Things Fall Apart" (January 1968 – July 1968)	September 24, 2017	1 hour 24 minutes (PBS)/55 minutes (BBC)
7	"The Veneer of Civilization (PBS)/Chasing Ghosts (BBC)" (June 1968 – May 1969)	September 25, 2017	1 hour 47 minutes (PBS)/55 minutes (BBC)
8	"The History of the World (PBS)/A Sea of Fire (BBC)" (April 1969 – May 1970)	September 26, 2017	1 hour 49 minutes (PBS)/55 minutes (BBC)
9	"A Disrespectful Loyalty (PBS)/Fratricide (BBC)" (May 1970 – March 1973)	September 27, 2017	1 hour 49 minutes (PBS)/55 minutes (BBC)
10	"The Weight of Memory" (March 1973 – Onward)	September 28, 2017	1 hour 47 minutes (PBS)/55 minutes (BBC)

== Interviewees ==
- Everett Alvarez, U.S. Navy pilot and POW from 1964 to 1973
- Nguyen Nguyet Anh, PAVN truck driver
- Nancy Biberman, American anti-war activist
- Anne Harrison Bowman, American military family member
- Philip Brady, American military and NBC News correspondent
- Nguyen Thoi Bung, National Liberation Front officer
- Philip Caputo, U.S. Marine Corps second lieutenant and journalist
- Rion Causey, 101st Airborne Division medic
- Trần Ngọc Châu, ARVN colonel and province chief of Kien Hoa, among other high-ranking roles
- Le Van Cho, PAVN
- Max Cleland, First Cavalry officer
- Le Quan Cong, Veteran of anti-French guerilla campaigns and National Liberation Front
- Carol Crocker, Military family member
- Jean-Marie Crocker, Military family member
- Cao Xuan Dai, PAVN
- Bui Diem, South Vietnamese ambassador to the U.S., among other high-ranking roles
- Huy Duc, Journalist
- Bill Ehrhart, US Marine
- Duong Van Mai Elliott, Viet Cong researcher, author
- Ron Ferrizzi, 1st Cavalry Division Helicopter Crew Chief
- Joan A. Furey, Staff nurse at the 71st Evacuation Hospital in Pleiku
- Joseph Galloway, Reporter for UPI
- Robert Gard, Military aide to Robert McNamara, retired three-star U.S. Army general
- Leslie Gelb, U.S. Defense Department analyst
- James Gillam, Army sergeant
- Phil Gioia, Army officer
- Donald Gregg, CIA
- Roger Harris, US Marine in I Corps
- Matt Harrison, U.S. Military
- Victoria Harrison, Military family member
- Mike Heaney, Platoon leader in the 1st Cavalry (Airmobile) Division
- Stuart Herrington, Army intelligence officer
- Nguyen Thi Hoa, Nation Liberation Front
- Jan Howard, Country singer and military family member
- Le Cong Huan, Viet Minh and National Liberation Front officer
- Tran Ngoc "Harry" Hue, ARVN lieutenant colonel
- Samuel Hynes, WWII veteran, Swarthmore College and Northwestern University English professor during the war
- Le Minh Khue, Ho Chi Minh Trail repair worker, PAVN journalist
- Hal Kushner, Army flight surgeon, POW
- Ho Huu Lan, PAVN officer
- John Laurence, CBS News correspondent
- Pham Luc, Propaganda poster painter
- Karl Marlantes, 3rd Marine Division, author
- Craig McNamara, anti-war demonstrator, son of Secretary of Defense Robert McNamara
- Merrill McPeak, Fighter pilot, Air Force Chief of Staff
- John Musgrave, Third Marine Division
- John Negroponte, foreign service officer in Vietnam, aide to Henry Kissinger during peace talks
- Nguyen Ngoc, Viet Minh, military journalist, and political officer in the PAVN
- Dong Si Nguyen, PAVN commander charged with maintaining the Ho Chi Minh trail
- Bao Ninh, PAVN, author
- Tim O'Brien, infantryman, author
- Vincent Okamoto, 25th Infantry Division officer
- Eva Jefferson Paterson, anti-war activist
- Rufus Phillips, Army officer, CIA officer, USAID official and State Department consultant
- Juan Ramirez, Marine
- Robert Rheault, Special Forces Colonel and commander of the Fifth Special Forces Group
- James B. Scanlon, South Vietnamese Army advisor
- Neil Sheehan, reporter
- Wayne Smith, combat medic
- Frank Snepp, CIA analyst and interrogator
- Nguyen Thanh Son, 174th PAVN Regiment
- Lewis Sorley, Tank battalion executive officer
- Nguyen Tai, North Vietnamese spy, counterespionage officer in Saigon
- Lo Khac Tam, PAVN leader
- Pham Duy Tat, ARVN army general
- Tran Cong Thang, PAVN combat engineer
- Lam Quang Thi, ARVN lieutenant general
- Tran Ngoc Toan, South Vietnamese marines
- Jack Todd, Army deserter, author of "Desertion: In the Time of Vietnam"
- Nguyen Van Tong, National Liberation Front 9th Division officer
- Phan Quang Tue, Worker in the Office of the Chief Justice of the Supreme Court in Saigon
- Nguyen Thanh Tung, Viet Minh and National Liberation Front
- Nick Ut, Associated Press photographer
- Juan Valdez, US Marine
- Thomas J. Vallely, US Marine corporal, founder of the Vietnam Program at the Harvard Kennedy School
- George Wickes, Office of Strategic Services
- James Willbanks, ARVN advisor, career officer
- Samuel V. Wilson, General, headed of the USAID pacification program
- Bill Zimmerman, Anti-war activist

Photographs and additional details about the interviewees can be seen on the PBS website.

== Home media ==
The Vietnam War was released on Blu-ray and DVD on September 19, 2017. Extras include a 45-minute preview program, two segments on the lives of two of the series' participants, and deleted scenes. The series is also available for digital download, and can also be seen on Kanopy.

== Book ==
Accompanying the series is a 640-page companion book, The Vietnam War: An Intimate History by Ward and Burns. Containing an introduction by Burns and Novick, it was published by Burns’ long-time publisher, Alfred A. Knopf, and released on September 5, 2017.

== Reception ==
Review aggregator Rotten Tomatoes gave the series an approval rating of 96% based on 49 reviews and a weighted average score of 9.36/10. The site's critical consensus states, "The Vietnam War revisits a dark chapter in American history with patience, grace, and a refreshing – and sobering – perspective informed by those who fought." Metacritic, another aggregator, gave the series a normalized score of 90 out of 100 based on 19 reviews, indicating "universal acclaim".

Washington Post opinion writer George Will noted that the series is "an example of how to calmly assess episodes fraught with passion and sorrow." He continues: "The combat films are extraordinary; the recollections and reflections of combatants and others on both sides are even more so, featuring photos of them then and interviews with many of them now." Will concludes his column by declaring the series a "masterpiece".

James Poniewozik of The New York Times wrote, "Will break your heart and win your mind."

Ken Burns anticipated politically motivated criticisms of the film from both the left and the right: "After The Vietnam War I'll have to lie low. A lot of people will think I'm a Commie pinko, and a lot of people will think I'm a right-wing nutcase, and that's sort of the way it goes."

San Jose Mercury News writer Tatiana Sanchez reported that some American and South Vietnamese veterans were "angry, [and] disappointed" with the documentary. They characterized it as a "betrayal". She writes: "veterans of the South Vietnamese military say they were largely left out of the narrative, their voices drowned out by the film's focus on North Vietnam and its communist leader, Ho Chi Minh. And many American veterans say that the series had several glaring omissions and focused too much on leftist anti-war protesters and soldiers who came to oppose the war."

Historian Mark Moyar published a review in which he criticized the series. Moyar felt that Burns and Novick overemphasized American battlefield defeats during 1966–1967 while glossing over the many victories. He also felt that Burns did not properly explain why American generals ordered their forces to fight so fiercely for seemingly meaningless hills; Moyar feels that engaging the Viet Cong in sparsely populated areas was a superior option to letting them draw near populated cities, where American airpower and artillery would require more careful use. Moyar also contended that Burns and Novick should have more strongly emphasized the amount of foreign aid that the North Vietnamese received from the Chinese and that both Vietnams were not entirely self-sufficient. He also believed that Nixon, a mercurial president who expressed many contradictory opinions, could not be taken entirely seriously in the tape excerpts used in the documentary wherein he appears to express a desire to cut South Vietnam loose immediately after the 1972 elections and the Paris Peace Accords, while the documentary let the excerpts stand as seeming fact.

Scholar Thomas Bass criticizes the film for its "urge toward healing and reconciliation, rather than truth". Bass's main objection is that the film perpetuates the narrative of the two Vietnams that justified U.S. involvement, arguing that "Southern Vietnam was never an independent country" and that Edward Lansdale played a role in that U.S. creation. He notes the prominent feature of Duong Van Mai Elliott in promoting this view, and the absence of a Daniel Ellsberg interview. Bass contends that this, together with the film's reliance on architects of the war such as "former generals, CIA agents and government officials, who are not identified by rank or title, but merely by their names and anodyne descriptions" is deemed as evidence of the film's "conservative credentials". Newsweek echoed Bass's objection that the movie obscures facts about the root causes of the war and its framing by the United States.

University of Chicago historian Mark Philip Bradley gave the mini-series a mixed review, saying "it is mainly unsuccessful at evoking the complexities of Vietnam’s past... We never hear a discussion of how American empire and the broader political, economic, and cultural complexities of the making of twentieth-century American global hegemony were bound up in the U.S. intervention in Vietnam. Questions of race and racism are only lightly addressed." But Bradley argued that the series was successful in telling "powerful individual stories that bring us into the quotidian dimensions of the American war in Vietnam in far more compelling ways than I have seen many other documentaries or books on Vietnam do."

However, Mark Lawson of The Guardian contends that "Such is the breadth of analysis here that Burns suggests the roots of the conflict began even before the story he told in The Civil War: the opening episode (of 10) is date-stamped “1858-1961”. Viewers’ double-take at that number 18 is soothed by a typically erudite explanation of the way French colonial ambitions in south-east Asia established faultlines that shaped the US’s later intervention." Although he acknowledges that "The early programmes could have done more (especially for an international audience) to explain the toxin of anti-communism in the US at the time: there is no mention of the red-hunts of Senator McCarthy, which surely did as much to create the context for the US’s misjudgment as a mistaken solidarity with French aims."

Journalist Huy Duc argued that the Vietnamese communist government did not like this documentary film because it did not follow their propaganda. Dr. Nguyen Tien Hung, former Minister of Planning of South Vietnam from 1973 to 1975, questioned the leftist and anti-South Vietnam bias of the film when it presented the views of leftist reporters without the voices of American reporters who were "revisionists". Lan Cao, daughter of the late South Vietnamese General Cao Van Vien, argued that the film was wrong in claiming that Vietnamese refugees from communism who came to the United States were only the elite of Vietnam, that American soldiers were mostly conscripts, that American soldiers relied on race and circumstance, that the communists breached the U.S. Embassy during the Tet Offensive, and that South Vietnamese soldiers were unwilling and unable to fight. She argued that American General Barry R. McCaffrey, advisor to the South Vietnamese Airborne Corps, believed that "the sacrifice, valor and commitment of the South Vietnamese army was greatly diminished by American political and media consciousness." She also argued that the Viet Cong were not a disparate guerrilla but were supported by North Vietnam while North Vietnam received $3.2 billion in aid or even double that from the Soviet Union and China. Phan Quang Tue, a retired San Francisco Immigration Court employee, commented: “Looking through the films that have been made, I see that there is no film that can be more truthful, and I don’t think there will be another film in the future because by the time this film comes out, it will be 42 years after the war. Two or three generations have grown up, this film faithfully records history, not of the war but through the history of that war, the history of Vietnam, North and South. I think what needs to be done is to widely disseminate this film in Vietnam.”

== Music ==
=== Score ===
During production, Burns and Novick approached Trent Reznor and Atticus Ross of Nine Inch Nails, asking them to create a score for the series. According to Reznor, he felt honored that they would offer them the opportunity, but immediately asked "why us?", feeling as their music wouldn't immediately come to mind for a documentary on the Vietnam War. Burns explained that he wanted a more "modern take" rather than just songs from the era. He then showed Reznor and Ross video clips of the documentary, with some of the group's other songs being used as a temporary soundtrack, which Reznor described as "powerful" and "emotionally rich," convincing them to join the project.

=== Soundtrack album ===
The PBS website describes the series as featuring "more than 120 iconic popular songs that define the era", including songs by then contemporary artists. Of these, 38 songs were selected for the series' soundtrack album, which was released on September 15, 2017.

The Vietnam War: The Soundtrack (Disc One)
No.	Title	Artist(s)	Length
1.	"A Hard Rain's Gonna Fall"	Bob Dylan	6:52
2.	"Hello Vietnam"	Johnnie Wright	3:05
3.	"It's My Life"	The Animals	3:09
4.	"Eve of Destruction"	Barry McGuire	3:35
5.	"Turn! Turn! Turn! (To Everything There Is a Season)"	The Byrds	3:49
6.	"Masters of War"	The Staple Singers	4:38
7.	"Mustang Sally"	Wilson Pickett	3:01
8.	"Smokestack Lightning"	Howlin' Wolf	3:08
9.	"Backlash Blues"	Nina Simone	2:28
10.	"The Sound of Silence"	Simon & Garfunkel	3:05
11.	"One Too Many Mornings"	Bob Dylan	2:37
12.	"Ain't Too Proud to Beg"	The Temptations	2:36
13.	"Are You Experienced?"	Jimi Hendrix	4:15
14.	"I'm a Man"	Spencer Davis Group	2:56
15.	"Green Onions"	Booker T & The MG's	2:56
16.	"Strange Brew"	Cream	2:46
17.	"Waist Deep in the Big Muddy"	Pete Seeger	2:55
18.	"A Whiter Shade of Pale"	Procol Harum	4:08
19.	"The Lord Is in This Place"	Fairport Convention	1:58
20.	"For What It's Worth"	Buffalo Springfield	2:33
Total length:			66:30

The Vietnam War: The Soundtrack (Disc Two)
No.	Title	Artist(s)	Length
1.	"Don't Think Twice It's Alright"	Bob Dylan	3:37
2.	"Piece of My Heart"	Janis Joplin	4:13
3.	"Magic Carpet Ride"	Steppenwolf	4:31
4.	"Tell the Truth"	Otis Redding	3:11
5.	"The Letter"	The Box Tops	1:52
6.	"Bad Moon Rising"	Creedence Clearwater Revival	2:21
7.	"Soul Sacrifice"	Santana	6:37
8.	"Okie From Muskogee"	Merle Haggard	2:42
9.	"The Thrill Is Gone"	B.B. King	4:02
10.	"Psychedelic Shack"	The Temptations	3:50
11.	"Ohio"	Crosby, Stills, Nash & Young	3:03
12.	"Get Together"	The Youngbloods	4:39
13.	"Gimme Shelter"	The Rolling Stones	4:30
14.	"Tail Dragger"	Link Wray	4:49
15.	"America the Beautiful"	Ray Charles	3:35
16.	"What's Going On"	Marvin Gaye	3:52
17.	"Bridge Over Troubled Water"	Simon & Garfunkel	4:53
18.	"Let It Be"	The Beatles	3:50
Total length:			70:07

=== Episode overview ===
- Episode 1 includes Bob Dylan's "A Hard Rain's a-Gonna Fall", T-Bone Walker's "Mean Old World", and Rosemary Clooney's "Come On-A In My House". The Dylan song is reprised over the closing credits.
- Episode 2 includes Miles Davis' "So What", Bill Doggett's "Honky Tonk (Part 1)", Woody Guthrie's "Dirty Overalls", The Ventures' "Walk, Don't Run", and Ben E. King's "Stand By Me". Sam Cooke's recording of "Mean Old World" (the same song performed by T-Bone Walker in the first episode) plays over the end credits.
- Episode 3 includes Bob Dylan's "With God On Our Side", Buffy Saint-Marie's "Universal Soldier", Johnnie Wright's "Hello Vietnam", Phil Ochs' "I Ain't Marchin' Anymore", The Animals' "It's My Life", The Rolling Stones' "Play With Fire", Donovan's "The War Drags On", Johnny Cash's "Big River", Barry McGuire's "Eve of Destruction", Burl Ives' "Little Drummer Boy", and over the closing credits, "Turn! Turn! Turn!" by The Byrds.
- Episode 4 includes The Staple Singers' "Masters of War", Wilson Pickett's "Mustang Sally", Nina Simone's “Backlash Blues”, Doug Wamble's "A Hard Rain's A-Gonna Fall", Howlin' Wolf's "Smokestack Lightning", Pete Seeger's "The Willing Conscript", Simon & Garfunkel's "The Sound of Silence", Donovan's "Sunshine Superman", Bob Dylan's "One Too Many Mornings", Simon & Garfunkel's "I Am a Rock", The Temptations' "Ain't Too Proud To Beg", Wayne Shorter "Footprints", Bob Dylan's "Talkin' World War III Blues", The Ventures' "Wild Child", Genesis's "Ravine" and Nine Inch Nails' "The Wretched". Simon & Garfunkel's "The Sound of Silence" played over the closing credits.
- Episode 5 includes Jimi Hendrix's "Are You Experienced?", The Spencer Davis Group's "I'm a Man", Cream's "Strange Brew", Pete Seeger's "Waist Deep In The Big Muddy", and, over the closing credits, the Rolling Stones' "Paint It Black".
- Episode 6 includes Janis Joplin & The Kozmic Blues Band's "Summertime" (live at Woodstock 1969), Jimi Hendrix's "Voodoo Chile", Vanilla Fudge's "You Keep Me Hangin' On", The Beatles' "Tomorrow Never Knows", Jefferson Airplane's "White Rabbit", Eddie Harris's "Live Right Now" and, over the closing credits, Procol Harum's "A Whiter Shade of Pale".
- Episode 7 includes Simon & Garfunkel's "Blues Run the Game", The Beatles' "Revolution 1", Khanh Ly's "Uot Mi", Simon & Garfunkel's "Anji", The Rolling Stones' "Street Fighting Man", Buffalo Springfield's "For What It's Worth", Simon & Garfunkel's "Bookends Theme", Bob Dylan's "Don't Think Twice, It's All Right", Big Brother & the Holding Company's "Piece of My Heart", The Velvet Underground's "The Gift-Instrumental", Steppenwolf's "Magic Carpet Ride", The Sandals' "Lonely Road", and, over the closing credits, Otis Redding's "Tell the Truth".
- Episode 8 includes Led Zeppelin's "Dazed and Confused", The Beatles' "While My Guitar Gently Weeps", The Box Tops' "The Letter", Three Dog Night's "Circle for a Landing", Creedence Clearwater Revival's "Bad Moon Rising", Country Joe McDonald's "I Feel Like I'm Fixing to Die Rag", Santana's "Soul Sacrifice", the Zombies' "Time of the Season", Otis Redding's "Respect", Santana's "Waiting", Nina Simone's "Come Ye", Bob Dylan's "Subterranean Homesick Blues", The Beatles' "Blackbird", Merle Haggard & the Strangers' "Okie from Muskogee", The Plastic Ono Band's "Give Peace a Chance", Cream's "Born Under a Bad Sign", Eddie Harris w/ "Live Right Now", B.B. King's "The Thrill is Gone", Bob Dylan's "Farewell, Angelina", Booker T. & the M.G.'s" w/ "Time is Tight", The Temptations' "Psychedelic Shack", Joni Mitchell's "Woodstock", and, over the closing credits, "Ohio" by Crosby, Stills, Nash & Young.
- Episode 9 includes The Youngbloods' "Get Together", The Animals' "We Gotta Get Out of This Place", The Rolling Stones' "Gimme Shelter", Jefferson Airplane's "Embryonic Journey", The Bob Crewe Generation Orchestra's "Barbarella", Joan Baez's "Where Have All the Flowers Gone?", Link Wray's "Tail Dragger", Ray Charles' "America the Beautiful", Fairport Convention's "The Lord is in this Place", and, over the closing credits, Marvin Gaye's "What's Goin' On?".
- Episode 10 includes "Kashmir" by Led Zeppelin, "All Along the Watchtower" by Jimi Hendrix, "Bridge Over Troubled Water" by Simon & Garfunkel, and, at the very end of the series, "Let It Be" by the Beatles.

== See also ==
- Vietnam: The Ten Thousand Day War, a 1980 Canadian television documentary about the Vietnam War which was produced by Michael Maclear
- Vietnam: A Television History, a 1983 documentary series which was also produced by PBS
