= Le Quan Cong =

South Vietnamese communist guerilla and soldier

Le Quan Cong was a South Vietnamese communist guerilla and soldier who fought against both French and American forces, and also Vietnamese anti-communist forces during the First Indochina War and the Vietnam War. He was a member of the Việt Cộng and first joined Vietnamese communist resistance movement (the Việt Minh) against France and the Vietnamese nationalists in 1951 when he was 12.

== Life and career ==
Le Quan Cong was primarily fighting in the Mekong Delta from 1960 to 1975. After South Vietnam's president Ngo Dinh Diem incarcerated tens of thousands of citizens and executed hundreds in an anti-communist campaign, Le Quan Cong was one of the Viet Cong who took up arms against Diem's right-wing government. Cong stated that he and other villagers used machetes early in the fighting when they did not have access to guns.

Cong was present at the hamlet of Ap Bac, near the village of Tan Thoi, when it was attacked on January 2, 1963, in what became known as the Battle of Ap Bac. Along with other Viet Cong, Cong had prepared trenches and bunkers so that the guerillas could take cover from South Vietnamese and American fire. Cong and fellow soldiers were able to destroy a series of American helicopters sent as reinforcements to the village. Cong stated that the Viet Cong viewed the battle as a major victory and inspired other Viet Cong guerillas across Vietnam. Cong became a Viet Cong platoon commander and survived the Tet Offensive 1968 assault in Saigon, capital of the Vietnam Republic (South Vietnam).

Interviewed by filmmaker Ken Burns for the TV series The Vietnam War, Cong said that three of his brothers and a sister were all killed by American or South Vietnamese forces during the war. Cong said that civilians were much more likely to be killed by American forces in helicopters than Viet Cong, since civilians ran at the sight of helicopters and were therefore easily seen and gunned down. By contrast he stated that Viet Cong forces were more likely to maintain their positions in these contexts.
