= James Scanlon =

James Scanlon may refer to:

- James B. Scanlon (1931–2023), American military officer
- James Scanlon (equestrian) (1948–2013), Australian equestrian
- James Scanlon (footballer) (born 2006), Gibraltarian footballer

== See also ==
- James Scanlan (1899–1976), Scottish Roman Catholic prelate
