= William Zimmerman =

William or Bill Zimmerman may refer to:

- William Carbys Zimmerman, American architect
- Bill Zimmerman (activist), American political consultant, author and anti-war activist
- Bill Zimmerman (baseball), American baseball player
- Will Zimmerman, a character in the Canadian television series Sanctuary
