= Tia Sáng (1991 magazine) =

Vietnamese Science and Technology magazine

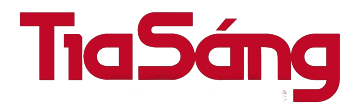
- Editor in Chief: Phạm Trần Lê
- Categories: Science magazine
- Frequency: Bi-weekly
- Founder: Nguyen Van Thanh, Le Tu
- Founded: 1991
- Country: Vietnam
- Based in: Hanoi
- Language: Vietnamese
- Website: Official website
- OCLC: 951312547

Tia Sáng (English: 'The Spark'/'Light ray') is a Vietnamese science and technology magazine created in 1991 under the Ministry of Science and Technology. It is considered a platform for intellectuals to raise their voice about policymaking decisions in Vietnam.

== History ==
Tia Sáng was founded in April 1991. Among Tia Sáng’s first contributors are Hoàng Tụy, the founder of Vietnamese mathematics; Phan Dinh Dieu who helped to build the ICT field in Vietnam; Viet Phuong, a poet, former secretary of Lê Duẩn; Lê Đạt, one of the pioneers in Nhan Van – Giai Pham movement, writer Nguyen Ngoc.

Many articles published in Tia Sáng were featured and discussed on BBC (Vietnamese version) such as Hoang Tuy’s article about the intellectuals’ attitude toward the social issues in Vietnam or the opinion piece of Tuong Lai, former director of Institute of Sociology about what communist party’s mission should be. Tia Sáng’s website was forced offline in 2009 by the government for several months because of its ‘sensitive’ articles. Some contributors of Tia Sáng were or are prisoners of conscience such as Phạm Đoan Trang, Lê Công Định.

Since the late 2000s, Tia Sáng has been less critical towards the government and took the solution journalism approach. It still maintains its position as a bridge between the science community and the mass. Its notable and frequent contributor nowadays is Pierre Darriulat, former research director of CERN.

It merged with the Development Science Newspaper (báo Khoa học Phát triển) in 2017.

Tia Sáng's advocacy of integrity and transparency in science resulted in the establishment of The National Foundation for Science and Technology of Vietnam (NAFOSTED). NAFOSTED is a science funding mechanism in Vietnam that gives scientists more freedom in doing research but demands higher quality in their scientific output. Tia Sáng also co-founded the Ta Quang Buu Prize that tribute scientists in basic science. Tia Sáng also initiates annually STEM Day to promote science communication and public outreach of the science community in Vietnam.
