= Duong Van Mai Elliott =

Vietnamese author (born 1941)

- Born: Dương Vân Mai; 1941 (age 84–85); Hanoi, Tonkin, French Indochina
- Education: Georgetown University, School of Foreign Service (1963)
- Occupations: Author, writer, translator
- Spouse: David W.P. Elliott (m. 1964)
- Writing career
- Notable works: The Sacred Willow: Four Generations in the Life of a Vietnamese Family; RAND in Southeast Asia: A History of the Vietnam War Era

Duong Van Mai Elliott (born 1941, née Dương Vân Mai) is a Vietnamese author, writer and translator. Her memoir, The Sacred Willow: Four Generations in the Life of a Vietnamese Family, tells the story of the Vietnam War from the perspective of a Vietnamese family. She was also featured in The Vietnam War, an 18-hour PBS documentary series about the conflict.

== Early life and education ==
Dương Vân Mai was born in 1941 into a middle-class family with eleven other siblings. Her father held several official positions under the French colonial administration and later the French-associated State of Vietnam. He later became the post-WWII governor of Haiphong, following his family's long-standing tradition of serving in various bureaucratic roles. Mai Elliot's great-grandfather Duong Lam, who was proficient in Confucian classics, served under the last emperor of Vietnam, Tu Duc, as a mandarin.

The Dương family lived in the official residences of Hanoi until the outbreak of World War II.

In the aftermath of WWII, the growing influence of the communist-led Viet Minh drove a wedge between her family members as they were split across ideological lines. Her parents were against the communist organization, and her father reluctantly served in the French-associated State of Vietnam. Mai's sister, however, was pro-communist and lived in the jungles of North Vietnam fighting alongside the Viet Minh, accompanied by her husband. Two of her elder brothers were also drafted into the Viet Minh militia. The involvement of Dương family members in Vietnamese politics gave her an insight into the perspective and opinions of the middle class on the Vietnam War, which helped her memoir, The Sacred Willow.

Mai and her family moved to Saigon in 1954, during her adolescence.

In 1960, Mai was awarded a scholarship by the U.S. government to pursue post-secondary education in the United States under its "Leadership Training Program". At the age of nineteen, Mai flew to the U.S. against her parents' wishes to study diplomacy at Georgetown University’s School of Foreign Service in Washington D.C. She graduated in 1963 with a major in Political science.

== Career ==
After her graduation from Georgetown University, Mai returned to Saigon and lived there from 1963 to 1968. Initially, Mai planned to work for the Vietnamese Foreign Ministry due to the influences of her family tradition of government service. Mai's marriage with an American, David Elliott, disrupted this plan. Instead, she worked for an American think tank, the RAND Corporation. She participated in the Viet Cong Motivation and Morale Project from 1964 to 1968. Her task was to interview Viet Cong prisoners of war and defectors to find out the morale and impetus of the guerrillas. At the end of this job, Mai Elliott and her husband David Elliott co-authored "Documents of an Elite Viet Cong Delta Unit: The Demolition Platoon of the 514th Battalion", which was published by RAND Corporation in 1969.

In 1975, when the Vietnam War came to an end, Mai Elliott moved back to the U.S. where she started a career in corporate banking. She eventually resigned from her job so as to write the book "The Sacred Willow: Four Generations in the Life of a Vietnamese Family", for which she had received a NEH grant of $80,000 to research and write. The book was published by Cambridge University Press in April 1999.

In 2010, the RAND Corporation published her second book "RAND in Southeast Asia: A History of the Vietnam War Era".

From 2014 to 2017, Mai Elliott served as one of the advisers for the PBS documentary series "The Vietnam War", directed by Ken Burns and Lynn Novick. She was also frequently featured on the show.

=== Inspiration for The Sacred Willow: Four Generations in the Life of a Vietnamese Family ===
Mai Elliott's inspiration to write her family's memoir stemmed from a desire to return to her origins after having travelled the world. One of her intentions behind writing The Sacred Willow: Four Generations in the Life of a Vietnamese Family (1999) was to provide her family members, who were now scattered around the world, with a written account of their family history. Mai Elliott also sought for the memoir to become a lens through which readers could better understand Vietnamese history, and the common struggles experienced by the displaced Vietnamese diaspora at large.

== Selected works ==
=== Books ===
- Documents of an Elite Viet Cong Delta Unit: The Demolition Platoon of the 514th Battalion (1969): Mai Elliott and her husband David W. P. Elliott translated documents of captured Viet Cong members which had detailed accounts of the personnel and the composition of the 514th battalion. They reviewed 17 dossiers that had information on the daily training activities of Viet Cong members from 1966 to 1967.
- The Sacred Willow: Four Generations in the Life of a Vietnamese Family (1999): This memoir published by Oxford University Press has been nominated for a Pulitzer Prize and was a finalist in the Asian-American Literary Award in 2000. Mai Elliott spent five years researching archives, compiling family papers and primary sources such as the numerous interviews with her family members. She conducted in-depth interviews with relatives located in the United States, France, Canada, Australia, and Vietnam. Mai Elliott wrote her memoir through a technique of multiple narratives, as opposed to writing in the traditional method of individual voice. The Sacred Willow serves as an important piece of Asian-American literature that provides insight on what Rocio Davis calls the "uncritical narratives of history". It engages with themes such as immigration, the clash between Asian traditions and Western practices, patriarchal structures, strong female roles, and Cold War American foreign policy. Some points of contention that can be pulled from this memoir is the misconstrued understanding of the Vietnam War and how the American narrative fails to address the ramifications of interventionist strategies in Asia through the post-war period. Critics found it important to mention how this memoir is taken from a middle/upper-class perspective of the volatile political climate in Vietnam during the 19th to 20th century.
- RAND in Southeast Asia: A History of the Vietnam War Era (2010): Mai Elliott delves into the inner workings of the RAND Corporation during the Vietnam War period by analyzing three countries: Vietnam, Thailand, and Laos. She discusses the influence of the findings in RAND on US foreign policy during the Vietnam War.

=== Translations ===
- Unforgettable months and years, by Vo Nguyen Giap (1975): Mai Elliott translated the autobiography of Vo Nguyen Giap.
- No Other Road to Take: The Memoirs of Mrs. Nguyen Thi Dinh (1976): Mai Elliott translated the autobiography of Nguyen Thi Dinh, a leader in the resistance against the French and the uprising against Ngo Dinh Diem.

== Filmography ==
=== Television ===
- The Vietnam War (2017): a PBS documentary miniseries directed by Ken Burns and Lynn Novick. It consists of 10 episodes, and incorporates 100 war witnesses from both sides of the conflict.
