= Robert H. York =

U.S. Army lieutenant general

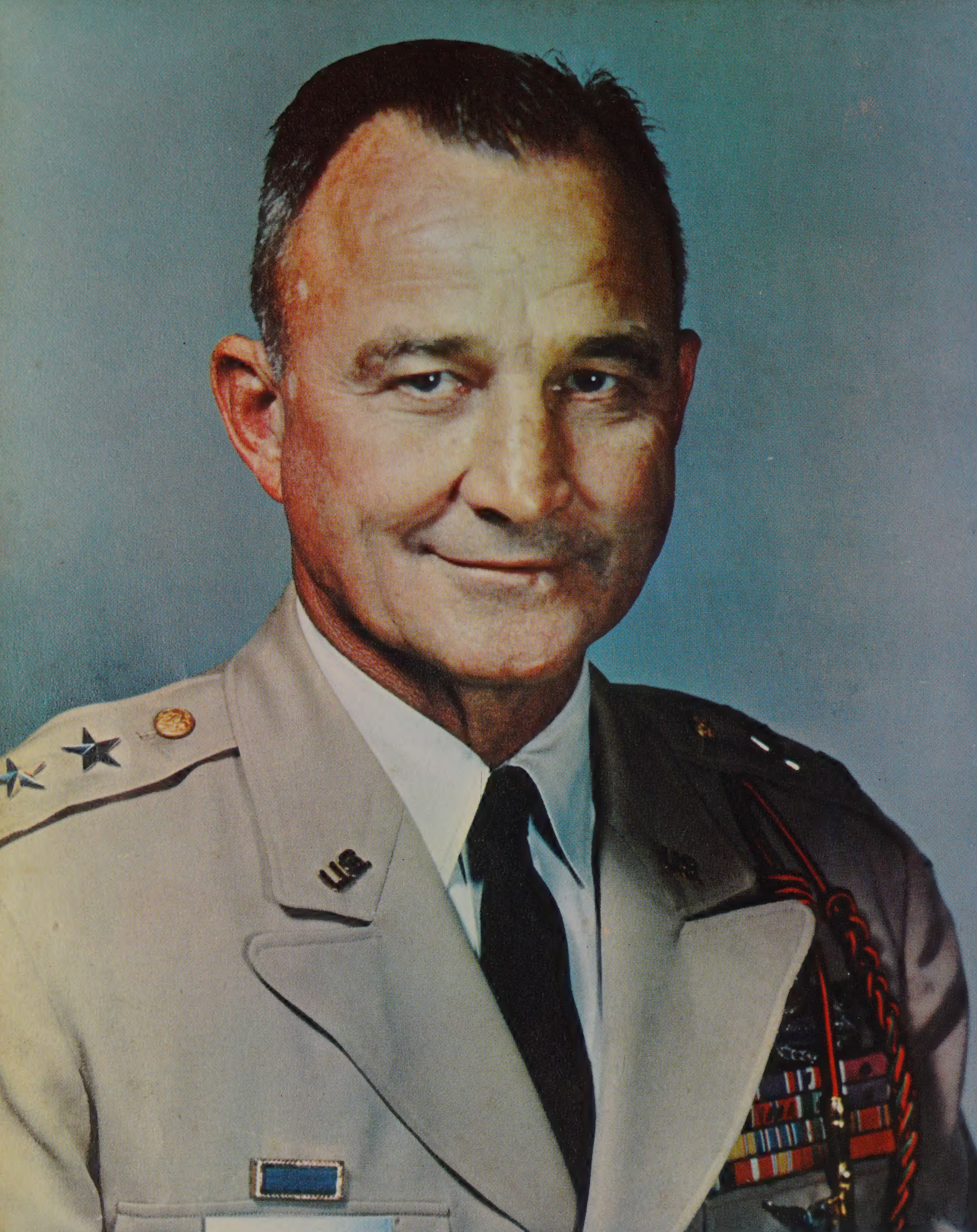
- York in 1966 as a major general commanding the U.S. Army Infantry School
- Born: April 23, 1913; Birmingham, Alabama, U.S.
- Died: April 15, 1988 (aged 74); San Diego, California, U.S.
- Burial place: West Point Cemetery, West Point, New York, U.S.
- Alma mater: United States Military Academy; United States Army War College
- Spouse: Grace Buckland (m. 1941–1988)
- Children: 5
- Military career
- Service: Alabama National Guard; United States Army
- Service years: 1933–1934 (National Guard); 1938–1968 (Army)
- Rank: Lieutenant General
- Service number: O-0021341
- Unit: U.S. Army Infantry Branch
- Commands: 331st Infantry Regiment; Director, Tactical Department, U.S. Army Infantry School; Director of Instruction, U.S. Army Infantry School; International Division, Department of Defense Office of Research and Development; Development Field Unit and Joint Operations Evaluation Group (South Vietnam), Defense Advanced Research Projects Agency; 82nd Airborne Division; U.S. Army Infantry School; XVIII Airborne Corps
- Wars: World War II; Allied-occupied Germany; Malayan Emergency; Vietnam War; Operation Power Pack
- Awards: 1st Battalion, 18th Infantry Regiment; Distinguished Service Cross; Army Distinguished Service Medal; Silver Star (3); Legion of Merit (2); Bronze Star Medal (4); Air Medal; Purple Heart

Robert H. York (April 23, 1913 – April 15, 1988) was a career officer in the United States Army. A 1938 graduate of the United States Military Academy (West Point), he attained the rank of lieutenant general, and was a veteran of World War II, Allied-occupied Germany, the Malayan Emergency, the Vietnam War, and Operation Power Pack, the 1965 U.S. intervention in the Dominican Republic during its civil war. His command assignments included the 331st Infantry Regiment, director of the Tactical Department and director of instruction at the United States Army Infantry School, director of the International Division in the army's Office of the Chief of Research and Development, director of Defense Research and Engineering for the United States Department of Defense, director of the Defense Advanced Research Projects Agency's Research and Development Field Unit and Joint Operations Evaluation Group in South Vietnam, the 82nd Airborne Division, the Infantry School, and XVIII Airborne Corps.

York retired in 1968, and his awards and decorations included the Distinguished Service Cross, Army Distinguished Service Medal, Silver Star with two oak leaf clusters, Legion of Merit with oak leaf cluster, Bronze Star Medal with three oak leaf clusters, Air Medal, and Purple Heart with oak leaf cluster. In retirement, he was a resident of Hartselle, Alabama. In 1983 he moved to San Diego, California. He died in San Diego on April 15, 1988. York was buried at West Point Cemetery.

== Early life ==
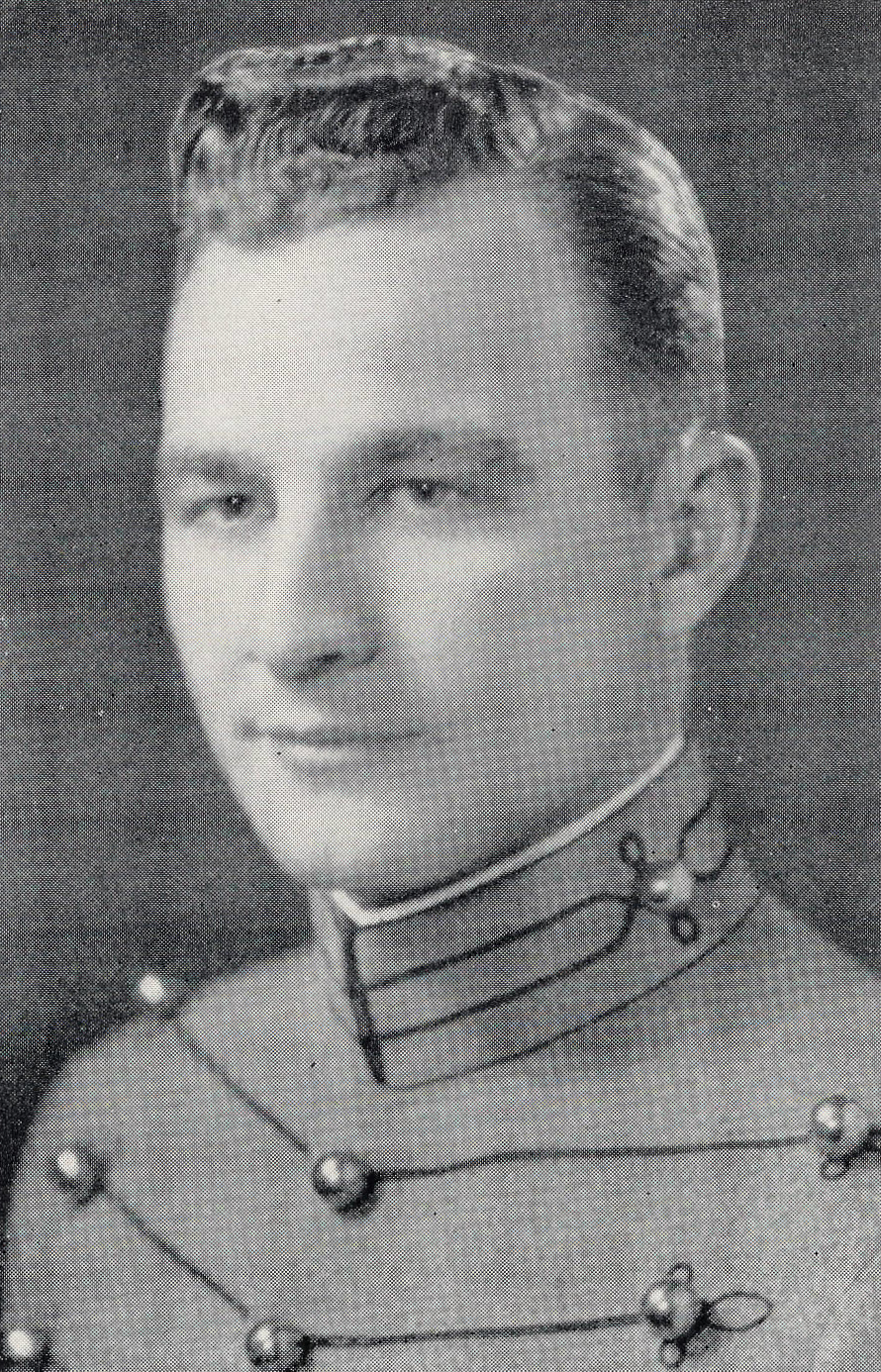
York as a West Point senior in 1938

Robert H. York was born in Birmingham, Alabama on April 23, 1913, the son of Arthur Leonidas "Lonnie" York and Carrie (Cooper) York. His mother died when he was five years old, and he was raised in Hartselle by his aunt and uncle, John and Eula Cooper, who became his legal guardians.

York attended the schools of Hartselle and Saint Bernard College, a preparatory school located in Cullman, Alabama, from which he graduated in 1933. In 1933, York began attendance at Marion Military Institute and also enlisted in the Alabama National Guard. In 1934, he was appointed to the United States Military Academy (West Point) by U.S. Representative Archibald Hill Carmichael. He graduated in 1938 ranked 290 of 301 and received his commission as a second lieutenant.

== Start of career ==
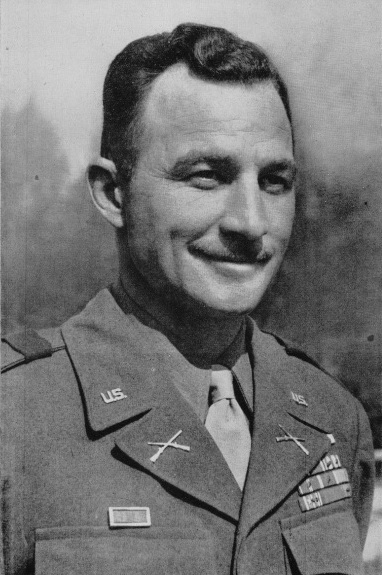
York as colonel commanding the 331st Infantry Regiment, 83rd Division, 1946

Originally slated for the Army Air Corps, a diagnosis of astigmatism prevented him from flying, and he was assigned to the Infantry. Posted to the 1st Infantry Division's 18th Infantry Regiment at Fort Wadsworth, New York, York trained with his regiment in anticipation of U.S. entry into World War II.

In 1942, with the country now involved in the war, he took part in the North African campaign, including the Operation Torch landings at Oran. He took part in the July 1943 Allied invasion of Sicily, as well as the 1944 Operation Overlord invasion of France, including the landing at Omaha Beach. York advanced through the ranks, and by June 1944 was a lieutenant colonel in command of the 18th Infantry Regiment's 1st Battalion.

In July 1944, York was transferred to the 83rd Infantry Division and assigned to command the division's 331st Infantry Regiment with the rank of colonel. The regiment had lost six commanders in less than month, and had sustained high casualties in post-Overlord combat in Normandy, so morale was at an ebb. York was credited with restoring the regiment's combat effectiveness, and remained in command through the end of the war, including combat in France, Belgium, Luxembourg, and Germany.

After the end of the war in Europe in May 1945, he continued to lead the 331st Infantry during the initial stages of Allied-occupied Germany, and he returned to the United States in April 1946.

== Continued career ==
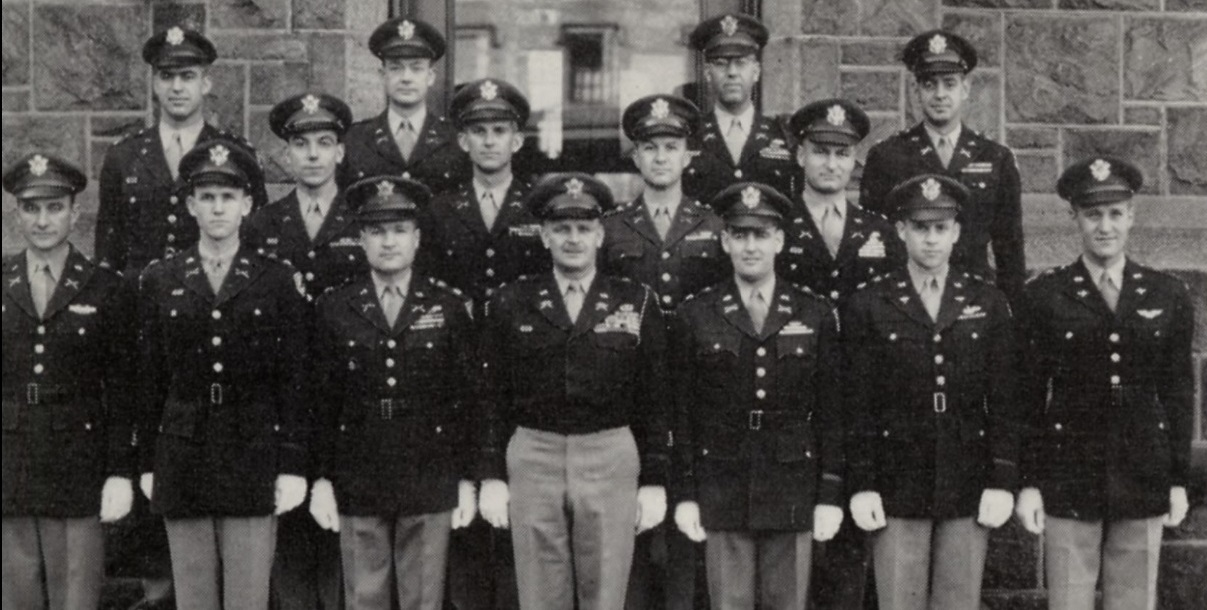
York (front, left) on the West Point faculty in 1948

From 1946 to 1950, York was assigned to West Point as an instructor of tactics. From 1950 to 1951, he was assigned as a staff officer in the office of the Army's Assistant Chief of Staff for Operations (G-3). In 1951, he began attendance at the United States Army War College, and after graduating in 1952 he was a student in the army's Strategic Intelligence Course. He was then assigned as the Assistant Chief of Staff for Intelligence (G-2) liaison officer in Singapore, British Malaya, and British Borneo. In this assignment, he aided in coordinating U.S. support to Great Britain during the Malayan Emergency, and he remained until 1956.

York served at Fort Benning from August 1956 to July 1959, and was successively director of the Tactical Department at the Infantry School, assistant chief of staff for operations (G-3) at the Infantry Center, director of instruction and assistant to the deputy commandant at the Infantry School, and chief of staff at the Infantry Center. In early 1958, he attended a three-month course in advanced management at Harvard University. In July 1959, York was appointed deputy chief of staff for the United Nations Command in South Korea. He returned to the United States in July 1960 and was assigned as chief of the International Division in the army's Office of Research and Development.

== Later career ==
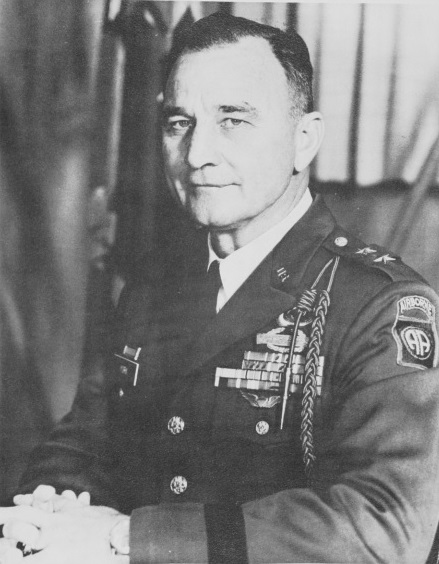
York as major general commanding 82nd Airborne Division, 1966

In late 1961, York was promoted to brigadier general, and in May 1962 he began an assignment as military advisor to the deputy director for tactical programs in the Department of Defense's Office of Defense Research and Engineering. In October 1962, he was assigned to duty in South Vietnam as director of the Defense Advanced Research Projects Agency's Development Field Unit and Joint Operations Evaluation Group. In this posting, he was responsible for observing and providing reports on tactics and techniques of North Vietnam's military and Viet Cong so the U.S. and South Vietnamese militaries could develop responses and counteractions. York was present and nearly killed during the token South Vietnamese artillery barrage the day after the Battle of Ap Bac; he submitted a highly critical report of the conduct of the war to Military Assistance Command, Vietnam, a report that was ignored.

In February 1964, York was assigned to command the 82nd Airborne Division as a major general. He remained in this position until July 1965, and led his unit during Operation Power Pack, the U.S. intervention in the Dominican Civil War. From July 1965 to August 1967, York commanded the Infantry School. In August 1967, he was promoted to lieutenant general as commander of the XVIII Airborne Corps, and he remained in command until retiring in August 1968.

== Retirement and death ==
In retirement, York was a resident of Hartselle, where his civic activities included helping start a halfway house for teenagers recovering from drug addiction. In 1983, he moved to San Diego, California. He died in San Diego on April 15, 1988. York was buried at West Point Cemetery.

== Awards ==
York's awards and decorations included:

- Distinguished Service Cross
- Army Distinguished Service Medal
- Silver Star with two oak leaf clusters
- Legion of Merit with oak leaf cluster
- Purple Heart with oak leaf cluster
- Bronze Star Medal with three oak leaf clusters
- Air Medal
- Army Commendation Medal with oak leaf cluster
- American Defense Service Medal
- American Campaign Medal
- European–African–Middle Eastern Campaign Medal (eight campaigns)
- World War II Victory Medal
- Army of Occupation of Germany Medal
- National Defense Service Medal with oak leaf cluster
- Armed Forces Expeditionary Medal
- Vietnam Campaign Medal
- Vietnam Service Medal
- Meritorious Unit Commendation
- Combat Infantryman Badge
- Army General Staff Identification Badge
- Master Parachutist Badge
- Aviator Badge
- Crolx de Guerre with Palm (France)
- Legion of Honor (Chevalier) (France)

== Family ==
In 1941, York married Grace Buckland, the sister of a West Point classmate, and they were married until his death. The Yorks were the parents of five daughters, one of whom did not live to adulthood.
