= James Willbanks =

American writer

James H. Willbanks
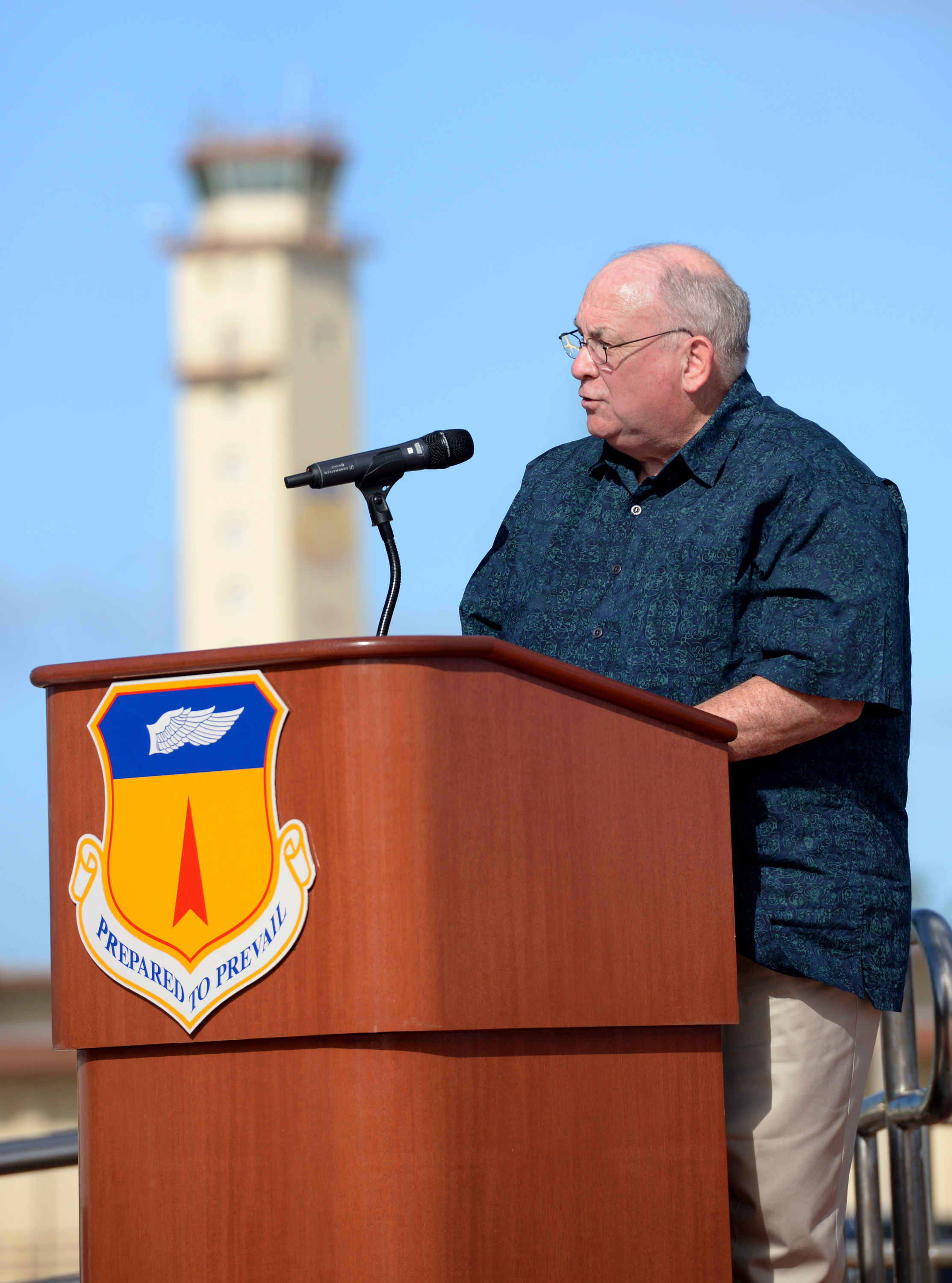
- James Willbanks at Andersen Air Force Base in 2015
- Born: 1947 (age 78–79); Hot Springs, Arkansas
- Education: Texas A&M University
- Occupation: Author
- Notable work: Thiet Giap! The Battle of An Loc (1993); The Tet Offensive: A Concise History (2008); A Raid Too Far: Operation Lam Son 719 and Vietnamization in Laos (2014)
- Awards: Professor Emeritus, Command and General Staff College
- Military career
- Allegiance: United States of America
- Branch: United States Army
- Service years: 1969–1992
- Rank: Lieutenant colonel
- Wars: Vietnam War
- Awards: Silver Star; Legion of Merit; Bronze Star (2); Purple Heart (2); Vietnamese Cross of Gallantry (3)

Doctor James H. Willbanks (born 1947) is an American author, military historian and former United States Army officer who served in the Vietnam War.

== Early life ==
He was born in Hot Springs, Arkansas in 1947. His father was a career Army Non-commissioned officer and his family moved frequently. He attended Texas A&M University graduating in 1969 with a bachelor's degree in history.

== Military career ==
He joined the Army in 1969 and was commissioned as a lieutenant. His first assignment was as a platoon leader in the 2nd Battalion, 30th Infantry Regiment, 3rd Infantry Division based in West Germany. There he encountered the declining morale of the Army with six members of his platoon in prison for violent crimes and rampant drug abuse.

He volunteered for service in South Vietnam as an adviser and attended adviser and Vietnamese language training. Promoted to captain, he arrived in South Vietnam in December 1971. His first assignment was with the Royal Thai Army Expeditionary Division until it was withdrawn in February 1972 and he was then assigned to the Army of the Republic of Vietnam (ARVN) 48th Regiment, 18th Division based at Xuân Lộc. He described his role as a "phone booth on the ground", "able to tap into the U.S. air support remaining in country – helicopters, tactical helicopters, tactical air, medevacs". On his third patrol his unit was ambushed in a rubber plantation and he was wounded by shrapnel, the battalion command unit fled the area and he and several other survivors took 12 hours to escape from the ambush, eventually being picked up by vehicles near an ARVN outpost.

During the Easter Offensive two battalions from the 18th Division, organised as Task Force 52, which had unsuccessfully attempted to reinforce other ARVN units in the Battle of Loc Ninh, withdrew to An Lộc. On 12 April Willbanks and another adviser volunteered to replace U.S. advisers who had been wounded and they were dropped by helicopter into An Lộc. The Battle of An Lộc began the following morning with an assault by People’s Army of Vietnam (PAVN) tanks. Willbanks stayed in An Lộc throughout the siege calling in the air support and resupply that was crucial to the defeat of the PAVN. On 9 July as the siege was nearing its end, he was among the advisers who went to meet with Third [Military] Regional Assistance Command deputy commander Brigadier General Richard J. Tallman and was wounded by the PAVN artillery fire that mortally wounded Tallman.

He earned a master’s in management from Texas A&M in 1979.

He attended the Command and General Staff College (CGSC) at Fort Leavenworth in 1983.

He retired from the Army in 1992 with the rank of lieutenant colonel.

== Military historian ==
He became a civilian instructor at the CGSC in 1992. He received his master’s in history from the University of Kansas in 1992 and then his doctorate in history there in 1998. He eventually became director of the Department of Military History and General of the Army George C. Marshall Chair of Military History at CGSC before retiring in May 2018 and being made the eighth CGSC Professor Emeritus.

He has written numerous military history books, primarily focussed on the Vietnam War. He was a consultant and interviewee for The Vietnam War (TV series).

He lives with his wife in Georgetown, Texas.

== Decorations ==
His decorations include the Silver Star, Legion of Merit, Bronze Star (2), Purple Heart (2) and Vietnamese Cross of Gallantry (3)

== Bibliography ==
- Thiet Giap! The Battle of An Loc. Combat Studies Institute. 1993. ISBN 9789993361114.
- Neither Peace Nor Honor: Vietnamization, U.S. Withdrawal, and the Fall of South Vietnam. University of Kansas. 1998.
- Abandoning Vietnam: How America Left and South Vietnam Lost Its War. University Press of Kansas. 2004. ISBN 9780700616237.
- Machine Guns: An Illustrated History of Their Impact. ABC-CLIO. 2004. ISBN 9781851094806.
- The Battle of An Loc. Indiana University Press. 2005. ISBN 9780253018991.
- The Tet Offensive: A Concise History. Columbia University Press. 2008. ISBN 9780231128414.
- Vietnam War Almanac: An In-Depth Guide to the Most Controversial Conflict in American History. Simon and Schuster. 2013. ISBN 9781626365285.
- A Raid Too Far: Operation Lam Son 719 and Vietnamization in Laos. Texas A&M University Press. 2014. ISBN 9781623491178.
- Danger 79er. Texas A&M University Press. 2018. ISBN 9781623496319.
- The Battle of Hue 1968: Fight for the Imperial City. Bloomsbury Publishing. 2021. ISBN 9781472844637.
