= Lo Khac Tam =

Vietnamese lieutenant general

Lo Khac Tam is a former Vietnamese lieutenant general who fought for the army of North Vietnam during the Vietnam War.

== War years ==
In 1965, Lo Khac Tam was a second lieutenant in the North Vietnamese army, and led a platoon of soldiers down the Ho Chi Minh Trail to the Ia Drang Valley. Tam was one of the first 100 graduates of the North Vietnamese military academy who volunteered to lead soldiers into South Vietnam.

Tam and his fellow soldiers arrived in the Chu Pong mountains. The Vietnamese forces engaged American forces on 14 November 1965 when American 1st Cavalry helicopters arrived at Landing Zone X-Ray in what became known as the Battle of Ia Drang. Tam stated that his soldiers fixed their bayonets to prepare for the battle, but that they suffered substantial losses that were psychologically shocking to their forces. Tam stated that one lesson the Vietnamese learned was that in order to fight the Americans, they needed to be at close quarters.

Tam would later see combat fighting against US Marines near Con Thien and the DMZ, and then at the fall Saigon.

== After the war ==
Interviewed in Ken Burns's television series The Vietnam War, Tam stated that the production of the series helped him have compassion for the families of American soldiers who also suffered during the war. Tam lamented the pain caused by the war: "The war was so horribly brutal. I don’t have words to describe it. How can we ever explain to the younger generation the price paid?"
