= John Musgrave =

American veterans' activist (born 1948)

John David Musgrave (May 12, 1948 - May 3, 2026) was an American Vietnam veteran, poet, counselor, and veterans' affairs advocate.

== Life ==
Musgrave was born in Independence, Missouri in 1948, and graduated from Van Horn High School in Independence in 1966. He enlisted with the Marine Corps just after graduating from high school. He was a member of the 1st Battalion, 9th Marines. He served in Vietnam for 11 months and seventeen days before being permanently disabled by his third wound at the battle of Con Thien in November 1967. He was medically retired as a corporal in 1969.

He studied at Baker University but graduated with a degree in sociology from Ottawa University in Ottawa, Kansas in 1972. He was a member of Vietnam Veterans Against the War. He acts with Theater of War Productions. He was interviewed extensively for the Ken Burns and Lynn Novick documentary The Vietnam War. He appeared with David Longhurst at the Watkins Museum of History for a panel about the war. Musgrave raised money for the Vietnam War Memorial at the University of Kansas and he served on the committee that helped see the Memorial be completed.

He was the model for the "Citizen-Soldier" granite sculpture at the Veterans of Foreign Wars National Headquarters in Kansas City, Missouri.

A married father of two grown sons, Musgrave lived with his wife in Kansas.

== Works ==
- The Vietnam Years: 1000 Questions and Answers (1986) (with Micheal Clodfelter)
- On Snipers, Laughter and Death: Vietnam Poems (1992)
- Under a Flare-Lit Sky: Vietnam Poems (1996)
- Notes to the Man who Shot Me: Vietnam War Poems. Coal City review. University of Kansas, English Department. 2003. ISBN 9787774580310.
- The Education of Corporal John Musgrave (2021)
