= Jack Todd (journalist) =

Canadian writer

- Born: 1946 (age 79–80); Nebraska, U.S.
- Citizenship: United States (until 1973); Canada (since 1975)
- Education: University of Nebraska
- Occupation: Journalist

Jack Todd (born 1946) is a Canadian sports columnist and author. Since 1986, he has written for the Montreal Gazette and is the author of several non-fiction and fiction books, including Desertion: In the Time of Vietnam (2001), a memoir of his resistance to the war in Vietnam and his decision to flee to Canada shortly after his induction into the U.S. Army.

== Early life and education ==
Todd was born in Nebraska in 1946. He attended the University of Nebraska from 1965 to 1969, planning to study English and journalism. Todd served as the editor of student newspaper The Daily Nebraskan in 1968, and was involved in multiple sports at Nebraska, including basketball and track and field.

== Career ==
Todd worked as a journalist for the Akron Beacon-Journal, the Detroit Free Press, and the Miami Herald. In 1969, he left for Canada to protest American involvement in Vietnam. He renounced his U.S. citizenship in 1973, and gained Canadian citizenship in 1975. Todd settled in Vancouver, British Columbia, Canada. He worked for the Vancouver Sun, Radio Canada International, and the Montreal Gazette.

In 2000, he won the National Newspaper Award for sports-writing and is recognized as one of Canada's leading sports journalists.

In 2001, he published a memoir, telling the story of his resistance to the war in Vietnam which was nominated for the Governor-General's Award. The Canadian title is The Taste of Metal, while the U.S. title is Desertion: In the Time of Vietnam.

In 2008, Todd published his first work of fiction, Sun Going Down, a novel on the opening of the American West based on his family history as constituted from letters and diaries. It was followed in 2010 with Come Again No More, which follows the family through the Great Depression. The final work in the trilogy, "Rain Falls Like Mercy", was published in 2011. Todd was interviewed for Ken Burns' 2017 miniseries The Vietnam War.

=== Books ===
- Desertion: In the Time of Vietnam (January 1, 2001) Publisher: Houghton Mifflin; 256 pages; ISBN 978-0618091553
