= Joan A. Furey =

United States Army nurse veteran

- Born: 1946 (age 79–80)
- Education: New York University; Stony Brook University
- Military career
- Allegiance: United States
- Branch: United States Army
- Unit: Army Nurse Corps

Joan A. Furey (born in Brooklyn, New York in 1946) is a United States Army nurse veteran. She began her military service in 1968 when she joined the Army Nurse Corps. Her patriotism influenced her volunteered deployment to Vietnam in 1969 where she served as a second lieutenant and eventually earned the Bronze Star. Her dedicated service continued when she returned home as Furey focused on aiding other returning Vietnam veterans. Her post-war accomplishments include earning her master's degree in nursing from New York University in 1975, pioneering studies in post-traumatic stress disorder (PTSD) through her service in the Department of Veteran Affairs, and her service as the Director of Center for Women Veterans.

== Early life ==
Joan A. Furey was born in Brooklyn, New York in 1946 and grew up on Long Island during her childhood. Growing up in a patriotic home, she was raised by a father who was a World War II veteran. In an interview later in her life, she spoke more candidly about her father's service. He served in Germany and France where he was wounded on the front lines. After returning home, he was diagnosed with “Soldiers Heart” and Furey attributes this to PTSD, even though it had not been specifically labeled and diagnosed yet. She remembers attending Memorial and Veteran Day parades. Her love for her country even at a young age propelled her future career. Furey recalls knowing she wanted to be a nurse as early as ten years of age. She attended and graduated from the Pilgrim State Hospital School of Nursing in Brentwood, New York in 1967.

Furey remembers two very opposite views of the Vietnam War. While her peers protested at Columbia University in early 1968, she felt no pressure to stand with them. The country was divided as the war in Vietnam raged on and prominent Civil Rights Leader Martin Luther King Jr. was assassinated in April 1968. Meanwhile, North Vietnamese and Viet Cong soldiers planned attacks all across South Vietnam in January 1968, in what is known as the first Tet Offensive. Instead of protesting, Furey chose to go to war.

== War service ==
In July 1968, Furey left for basic training at Fort Sam Houston's Medical Field Service School. There she learned basic Army Corps protocol including administration duties, military rank and positions, and understanding common medical departments. In a short six-week period, she excelled in medical training which often included performing treatments on bleeding goats. After basic training, she served at Letterman Hospital in San Francisco, California. Her time there helped prepare her for life at war in Vietnam as she worked in the intensive care unit (ICU) and emergency room. While there she cared for wounded Vietnam War soldiers with injuries ranging from shrapnel wounds to amputations.

Furey deployed to Vietnam on January 27, 1969 and remembers bombing on her first sleepless night in the battle field at Bien Hoa Air Base in South Vietnam. She was transferred to a very short-handed unit in the Central Highlands, the 71st Evacuation Hospital in Pleiku, Vietnam. Her experience in the ICU at Letterman Hospital allowed her responsibility in the ICU at the 71st Evacuation Hospital, even as a young nurse. Like many nurses, Furey had to detach her emotions from the soldiers she worked on and the war itself. The demoralizing war and the unanswered questions of why America was involved took a toll on her as the war raged on. Furey spent a full year in the ICU unit as she refused to be rotated out after six months. Her nursing efforts saw her care after not only U.S and ARVN soldiers, but also for Vietnamese civilians. She was discharged from the Army in 1970 and returned home after spending a full year in the service of her country in Vietnam. She was awarded the Bronze Star for her patriotic duty and heroic nursing efforts.

== Post-war life ==
Furey returned home and went back to school aided by the G.I. Bill. She received her Bachelor of Science in Nursing degree from Stony Brook University in Stony Brook, New York, then received her Master of Science in Nursing degree from New York University in Manhattan, New York.

Her post-war efforts directly correspond with her service in Vietnam, as she pioneered efforts in post-traumatic stress disorder (PTSD) and women veterans' affairs. Her career is heavily based in nursing efforts for the Department of Veteran Affairs, where she served for 30 years. She worked all over the country in veterans' projects including in Bay Pines, Florida and Menlo Park, California in various capacities. She helped conduct research in PTSD and the psychological effects of war on women veterans.

=== Work in PTSD ===
Although Furey's time at war was short, the impact of her service was life changing. Like her, many other veterans returned home, but their minds suffered from major damage. Tragedy, bloodshed, and death caused many veterans to suffer from what is now called post-traumatic stress disorder, a term coined in the 1970s after the effects of the Vietnam War. Furey devoted her life to this cause, helping and aiding women veterans who suffered from PTSD, and who were often forgotten by the general public.

Furey began working for Veteran Affairs in 1978 and was stationed as a nurse at the VA Medical Center in Bay Pines, Florida. Over the next several years, she found herself advancing in VA ranks and participating in state-of-the-art research that would define her career. She was named the Director of the Department of Veteran Affairs' Center for Women Veterans in 1995.

As associate director of education at the Palo Alto, California Medical Center, Furey pioneered the first-ever Veteran Affairs National Center for Post-Traumatic Stress Disorder. Here, she established an in-house treatment program for women returning from war.

Furey was known for her proficiency and knowledge in PTSD study, and even testified before Congress in 2000, proving statistics on women veterans and their role in society. She tried to get more aid and help from the government to support these women.

She worked on numerous scholarly articles and research projects, bringing to light the effects of war on servicewomen.

Her most well-known accomplishment is her work on the Visions of War: Dreams of Peace anthology.

=== Visions of War: Dreams of Peace ===
In 1991, Furey co-edited a compilation of poetry pieces by veteran women who served in Vietnam with another former Army nurse, Lynda Van Devanter. The anthology brought to life the voices of women who served as nurses in the battlefields of Vietnam.

An interview at the United States Air Force Academy in 1999 with Donald Anderson was supposed to capture her thoughts on the book, but the interview discussed much more. After Furey explained that her most favorite piece of Vietnam War literature was Tim O’Brien's "How to Tell a True War Story" from The Things They Carried, Anderson asked her about literature from the view of a woman. She explained her work on the poetry pieces. She said women were not willing to use their names in correspondence with their work, as they feared the stories would not be appreciated, and that readers would not accept their point of view on war. Furey, along with co-author Van Devanter, encouraged the women to let their voices be heard, to help them understand many were feeling the same anxieties about their experiences in Vietnam. They helped the women find meaning in their moving tributes.

Furey says that many women, including herself, came from nursing backgrounds, but that the young girls had never experienced injuries like they saw in Vietnam. The experiences had two outcomes for nurses: they either empowered the women, or completely destroyed them. She explains how real PTSD was for these returning nurses, and how neglected they felt because they had to worry about the dying soldier rather than their own pain and suffering.

=== Awards and accomplishments ===
Furey has authored several published pieces and was co-author of the poetry anthology Visions of War: Dreams of Peace.

She has received many awards, including the 1998 National Public Service Award, and the 1998 the Common Cause Public Service Achievement Award. In 1999, she was the recipient of the Women Executives in State Government "Breaking the Glass Ceiling Award". She received the Department of Veteran Affairs Exceptional Service Award in 2000, and the Veteran Affairs Distinguished Career Award in 2004. She was inducted into the New York State Veterans Hall of Fame in 2015.

Furey appeared in the PBS documentary The Vietnam War.
