= James B. Scanlon =

U.S. Army officer (1931–2023)

James Bernard Scanlon
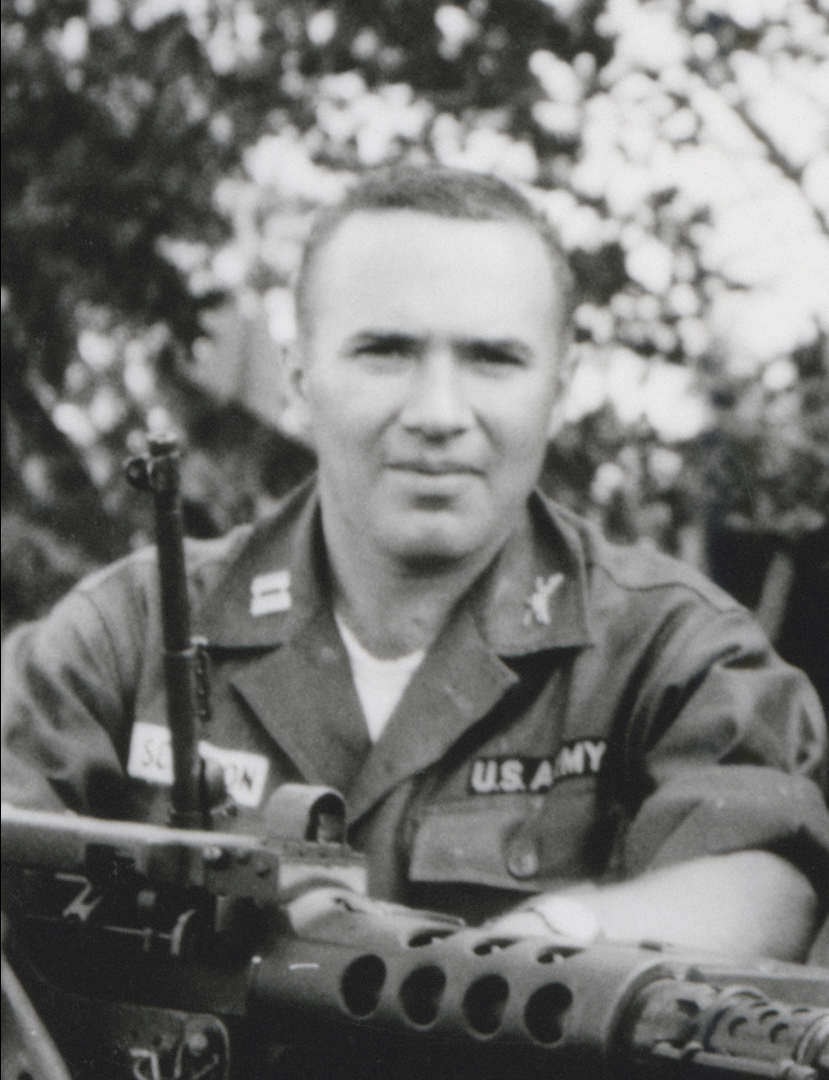
- Born: January 16, 1931; St. Louis, Missouri, U.S.
- Died: October 30, 2023 (aged 92)
- Burial place: Arlington National Cemetery
- Education: University of Nebraska Omaha; George Washington University
- Spouse: Nancy Zerillo (m. 1952; died 2011)
- Military career
- Allegiance: United States
- Branch: United States Army
- Rank: Lieutenant Colonel
- Unit: 11th Airborne Division
- Conflicts: Korean War; Vietnam War; Battle of Ap Bac

James Bernard Scanlon (January 16, 1931 – October 30, 2023) was a U.S. Army officer who served in the Korean and Vietnam Wars. Scanlon is notable for serving as an American advisor in South Vietnam from 1962 to 1963, and was involved in the Battle of Ap Bac.

== Early life ==
Scanlon was born on January 16, 1931, in St. Louis, Missouri. He attended the Christian Brothers College High School. He enlisted in the army after school and attended the Armor Officer Candidate School. After he completed parachute training at Fort Benning, he was assigned to the 710th Tank Battalion in the 11th Airborne Division. Scanlon obtained a bachelor's degree through the Army's Bootstrap Program at the University of Nebraska at Omaha and took postgraduate courses in management at George Washington University. He retired with the rank of lieutenant colonel in 1973.

== Vietnam War ==
Scanlon served as an advisor in South Vietnam from 1962 to 1963. He was an adviser to the ARVN's 2nd Armored Cavalry Regiment, and served with his South Vietnamese counterpart, Captain Ly Tong Ba, who was commander of the 4th Mechanized Rifle Squadron, 2nd Armored Cavalry Regiment.

== Personal life ==
Scanlon married his high school sweetheart, Nancy Zerillo, on May 24, 1952. His wife predeceased him in 2011. He died on October 30, 2023, and is buried at Arlington National Cemetery.

== Appearances ==
Scanlon appeared in Ken Burns' The Vietnam War, Episode "Riding the Tiger (1961-1963)." He is also mentioned in Neil Sheehan's, A Bright Shining Lie, David Halberstam's The Making of A Quagmire, and Geoffrey C. Ward and Ken Burns, The Vietnam War: An Intimate History.
