= Nguyen Ngoc =

Vietnamese writer and dissident

Nguyễn Văn Báu, better known as Nguyên Ngọc, is a Vietnamese writer and dissident, and was a political officer and soldier who fought for the North Vietnamese, Viet Cong and communist forces during the Vietnam War.

Nguyen Ngoc was the son of a post officer worker south of Danang. Ngoc met and was deeply impressed by North Vietnamese political leader Lê Duẩn in 1951. Ngoc joined the Viet Cong as a political officer writing poems and slogans in support of their cause. His siblings worked as teachers in schools in South Vietnam.

Interviewed by filmmaker Ken Burns for the TV series The Vietnam War, Ngoc described how Ho Chi Minh used simple language and humble imagery to effectively communicate with villagers in Vietnam. Ngoc speculated that if Le Duan had not escalated their conflict with the South Vietnamese and Americans in 1964, perhaps the Americans would not have escalated in retaliation, and the Southern government would have collapsed on its own.

Ngoc described his belief and the belief of other Viet Cong or North Vietnamese that the Tet Offensive would lead to a rebellion in the cities of South Vietnam. Ngoc was disappointed when this did not occur, and described the massacres of South Vietnamese government officials, collaborators, and civilians by Viet Cong and North Vietnamese forces after the fall of the city Hue.

Ngoc saw extensive combat in the jungles of Vietnam, and decried the savagery of war.
