= Vincent Okamoto =

WWII relocation camp internee, US Army officer, judge and author (1943–2020)

- Born: November 22, 1943; Poston, Arizona, U.S.
- Died: September 27, 2020 (aged 76); Torrance, California, U.S.
- Resting place: Green Hills Memorial Park, Rancho Palos Verdes, California
- Occupations: Soldier, judge
- Military career
- Allegiance: United States of America
- Branch: United States Army
- Service years: 1967–1970
- Rank: Captain
- Units: Company B, 2nd Battalion, 27th Infantry Regiment 25th Infantry Division
- Conflicts: Vietnam War
- Awards: Distinguished Service Cross; Silver Star; Bronze Star; Purple Heart (with three Oak Leaf Clusters); Vietnam Cross of Gallantry

Vincent Hichiro Okamoto (Japanese: 岡本 七郎, November 22, 1943 – September 27, 2020) was an American attorney, judge, author, and retired United States Army officer. An Army Ranger during the Vietnam War, he was the most highly decorated Japanese American to survive the war.

== Biography ==
Okamoto was born November 22, 1943, to an American family of Japanese origin that was interned during the Second World War at the Poston relocation camp in Arizona. He was the youngest of the ten children of Henry and Yone Okamoto.

Following the family's release they moved to South Chicago, where his parents ran a small grocery store. The family later moved to Gardena, California, when he was twelve years old. He attended Gardena High School, where he served as senior class president. He was a three-year letterman in track and football and belonged to the Men's Honor Society.

=== US Army and career in Vietnam ===
Okamoto attended El Camino College from 1962 to 1965. From 1965 to 1967 he attended University of Southern California (USC) receiving a Bachelor of Arts degree in International Relations in 1967. He enrolled in the ROTC and was the first non-UCLA student to be commissioned through the UCLA ROTC program. He earned his commission as a U.S. Army 2nd Lieutenant.

After receiving Ranger training he was given orders to report to Vietnam. In 1968, Okamoto was assigned as the intelligence-liaison officer for two months for the Phoenix Program while attached to Company B of the 2nd Battalion, 27th Infantry Regiment, 25th Infantry Division.

Okamoto distinguished himself on August 24, 1968, while serving as a platoon leader with an infantry unit near Dầu Tiếng. A ground attack was launched against his battalion's night location by three reinforced People's Army of Vietnam (PAVN) and Viet Cong companies. The initial assault destroyed a strategic section of the perimeter. Under heavy automatic weapons, small arms and rocket-propelled grenade fire, Okamoto moved five of his men to restore this vital position.

Realizing the need for supporting fire, he ran to a partially destroyed armored personnel carrier and manned its machine gun. After the weapon malfunctioned, he dashed through the fusillade of enemy fire to a second and then a third carrier to place suppressing fire on enemy soldiers.

=== Civilian life ===
==== Personal ====
After returning to civilian life, he enrolled in college and attained his law degree at USC. He also married his sweetheart, Mitzi Nishiyama on December 8, 1967. He was also instrumental in establishing the Japanese American Vietnam War Veterans Memorial at the National Japanese American Veterans Memorial Court.

==== Legal ====
Okamoto spent five years as a prosecutor and eight years practicing law privately.

On April 15, 2002, Governor Gray Davis appointed Okamoto to the Los Angeles Superior Court bench. He was honored as the 2006 UCLA Veteran of the Year. Okamoto continued to serve the community on various Veterans boards, in Gardena city government.

==== Writing ====
Okamoto was a novelist as well, having penned Wolfhound Samurai: A Novel of the Vietnam War. His second publication called Forged in Fire: The Story of Hershey and Joe was released in 2012.

==== Death ====
Okamoto died on Sunday, September 27, 2020. The official cause of death was ruled as a cardiac arrest. He was laid to rest next to his mother, Yone Okamoto at Green Hills Cemetery.

== Honors ==
Okamoto was the highest-decorated living Japanese-American veteran of the Vietnam War. His medals include

- Purple Heart with three oak leaf clusters
- Distinguished Service Cross
- Silver Star
- Bronze Star
- Vietnamese Cross of Gallantry

He was inducted into Ranger Hall of Fame on September 1, 2007. He is the fourth Japanese American (and first since World War II) to receive the honor.

Citation for award of the Distinguished Service Cross –

The President of the United States of America, authorized by Act of Congress, July 9, 1918 (amended by act of July 25, 1963), takes pleasure in presenting the Distinguished Service Cross to Second Lieutenant (Infantry) Vincent Hichiro Okamoto (ASN: OF-1124459), United States Army, for extraordinary heroism in connection with military operations involving conflict with an armed hostile force in the Republic of Vietnam, while serving with Company B, 2d Battalion, 27th Infantry, 25th Infantry Division. Second Lieutenant Okamoto distinguished himself by exceptionally valorous actions on August 24, 1968, while serving as a platoon leader with an infantry unit near Dau Tieng. A ground attack was launched against his battalion's night location by three reinforced North Vietnamese and Viet Cong companies. The initial assault destroyed a strategic section of the perimeter. Under heavy automatic weapons, small arms and rocket-propelled grenade fire, Lieutenant Okamoto moved with five of his men to restore this vital position. Realizing the need for supporting fire, he ran to a partially destroyed armored personnel carrier and manned its machine gun. After the weapon malfunctioned, he dashed through the fusillade of enemy fire to a second and then a third carrier to place suppressing fire on the aggressors. Spying a group of enemy soldiers maneuvering toward the unit's lines, Lieutenant Okamoto crawled under cover of small arms and automatic weapons fire to less than ten meters from the communists and destroyed them with fragmentation grenades. He was injured by a hostile concussion grenade, which exploded close to his position, but refusing aid he kept fighting until the North Vietnamese/Viet Cong force was defeated. Second Lieutenant Okamoto's extraordinary heroism and devotion to duty were in keeping with the highest traditions of the military service and reflect great credit upon himself, his unit, and the United States Army.

General Orders: Headquarters, U.S. Army, Vietnam, General Orders No. 5636 (December 7, 1968)

Action Date: 24-Aug-68 Service: Army Rank: Second Lieutenant Company: Company B Battalion: 2d Battalion Regiment: 27th Infantry Regiment Division: 25th Infantry Division

== See also ==
- List of Asian American jurists
