= Battle of Ap Bac =

1963 battle of the Vietnam War

Battle of Ấp Bắc Trận Ấp Bắc
- Part of the Vietnam War
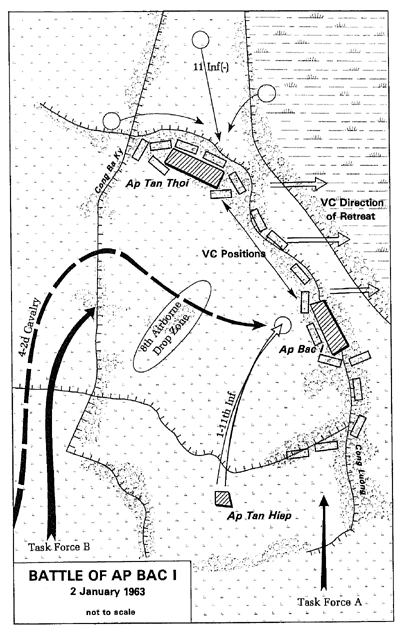
- A map of the battlefield.
Date	2 January 1963
Location	10°26′18″N 106°11′43″E; Ấp Bắc, Châu Thành, Định Tường Province, South Vietnam
Result	Viet Cong victory

Belligerents
Viet Cong	South Vietnam; United States

Commanders and leaders
Võ Văn Hoàng; Đặng Minh Nhuận	(South Vietnam) Bùi Đình Đạm (South Vietnam) Huỳnh Văn Cao (United States) John Paul Vann

Units involved
261st Battalion; 514th Battalion	(South Vietnam) 7th Division: 11th Infantry Regiment; 2 Civil Guard battalions; 4th Mechanised Rifle Squadron; 8th Airborne Battalion (United States) 93rd Transportation Company

Strength
350 guerrillas	1,400 troops 13 M113 APCs; 10 CH-21 Shawnees; 5 UH-1C Iroquois; 1 L-19 Bird Dog

Casualties and losses
18 killed 39 wounded	(South Vietnam) South Vietnamese: 86 killed; 108 wounded; (United States) American: 3 killed; 8 wounded; 5 helicopters destroyed

The Battle of Ấp Bắc was a major battle fought on 2 January 1963 during the Vietnam War in Định Tường Province, South Vietnam. On 28 December 1962, US intelligence detected the presence of a radio transmitter along with a sizable force of Viet Cong (VC) soldiers, reported to number around 120, in the hamlet of Tân Thới (Vietnamese: Ấp Tân Thới) in Định Tường Province, home of the Army of the Republic of South Vietnam (ARVN) 7th Infantry Division. The South Vietnamese and their US advisers planned to attack Ấp Tân Thới from three directions to destroy the VC force by using two provincial Civil Guard battalions and elements of the 11th Infantry Regiment, 7th Infantry Division. The infantry units would be supported by artillery, M113 armored personnel carriers (APCs), and helicopters. However, VC forces anticipated a major attack from the South Vietnamese government from a variety of sources including movement of supplies, an undercover VC agent, and decoded radio communications from the ARVN. Accordingly, the VC prepared for an attack by US and South Vietnamese forces.

On the morning of 2 January 1963, the Civil Guards spearheaded the attack by marching toward Ấp Tân Thới from the south. However, when they reached the hamlet of Bắc (Vietnamese: Ấp Bắc), southeast of Ấp Tân Thới, they were immediately pinned down by elements of the VC 261st Battalion. Shortly afterward, three companies of the 11th Infantry Regiment were committed into battle in northern Ấp Tân Thới. However, they too could not overcome the VC soldiers who had entrenched themselves in the area. Just before midday, further reinforcements were flown in from Thân Cửu Nghĩa Airbase in Tân Hiệp. The 15 US helicopters ferrying the troops were riddled by VC gunfire and five helicopters were lost as a result.

The ARVN 4th Mechanized Rifle Squadron was then deployed to rescue the South Vietnamese soldiers and US aircrews trapped at the southwest end of Ấp Bắc. However, its commander was highly reluctant to move heavy M113 APCs across the local terrain. Ultimately, their presence made little difference as the VC stood its ground and killed more than a dozen South Vietnamese M113 crew members in the process. The ARVN 8th Airborne Battalion was dropped late in the afternoon onto the battlefield. In a scene that characterized much of the day's fighting, they were pinned down and could not break the VC's line of defense. Under cover of darkness, the VC withdrew from the battlefield, winning their first major victory.

== Background ==
Small-scale military actions, which would eventually escalate into the Vietnam War, started in the late 1950s, when South Vietnamese President Ngô Đình Diệm instituted an anti-Communist campaign aimed at rooting out "left behind" Việt Minh forces. At that time, North Vietnam was hoping for an election, promised under the Geneva Accords of 1954, that would unite North and South Vietnam. It was also worried about inciting the United States into directly supporting South Vietnam and had recommended avoiding battle at all costs. However, Diem's campaign was too successful to allow them to do nothing, and small-scale actions broke out across the country. North Vietnam remained worried about US involvement and refused military support, forcing the remaining Việt Minh to retreat into inaccessible areas in the forests and mountains. A stalemate of sorts followed as South Vietnamese forces took so long to reach these areas that the guerrilla fighters were able to retreat with little difficulty.

Large-scale American support began during the Kennedy Administration in the early 1960s, with the arrival of large numbers of the US Special Forces to help out in the field. The arrival of helicopters changed the nature of the battle considerably. Helicopters enabled South Vietnamese soldiers to quickly fly to almost any point in the country, leaving little time for a retreat. Throughout 1962, the combined forces were increasingly effective in routing the VC. These tactics, combined with armored personnel carriers, took a heavy toll on various fledgling VC units. The lightly armed VC had no weaponry capable of stopping the armored carriers and inevitably were forced to flee, taking heavy casualties.

The most successful South Vietnamese force had been the 7th Infantry Division, then under the command of Colonel Huỳnh Văn Cao. His US adviser was Lieutenant Colonel John Paul Vann, who directed much of the unit's activity in concert with his planner, Captain Richard Ziegler. They had scored the biggest successes of the military campaigns of 1962, killing along with the paramilitary and Civil Guard and Self Defense Corps, more than 2,000 VC fighters, and leaving thousands of others cut off from supplies.

However, South Vietnamese officers were often reluctant to absorb heavy casualties. On several occasions, Cao's forces were in an excellent position to trap and wipe out whole battalions of VC. However, he would fail to close the trap on one pretext or another and allow the enemy to escape. This behavior initially mystified Vann, who was attempting to build Cao into an aggressive commander. Unknown to Vann, Diem would reprimand or demote any officer who lost too many men, no matter how successful the operation. After a skirmish on a highway that resulted in a small number of South Vietnamese casualties along with several trucks destroyed, Cao was called to Saigon and reprimanded by Diệm. Upon his return, Vann and his group of advisers were forced to end the joint planning sessions that had been so successful earlier, and action essentially wound down in their region. Cao used the excellent military intelligence network they had developed to find areas devoid of VC, and planned operations only in those areas. In many other cases, operations were executed on paper only to report an increasing tempo of operations that did not exist.

In 1962, Diệm decided to split the command of the area in the south around Saigon into two, the former III Corps area being reduced in size to cover the area northeast of Saigon, and the newly created IV Corps taking over the west and southwest. Cao was promoted to general and assumed command of the new IV Corps Tactical Zone, which included the area of operations of his 7th Infantry Division. Command of the 7th was given to Cao's chief of staff, Colonel Bùi Đình Đạm. Dam expressed concerns about his own abilities when the promotion was first presented to him by Diệm. Nevertheless, he took Cao's former position and welcomed Vann's advisers back into the planning effort. Despite the change in leadership, the same problems continued to plague the 7th Infantry Division.

== Prelude ==
In November 1962, the VC's Military Region 2 ordered the VC 261st Battalion and the 514th Battalion, the home battalion of Định Tường Province, to destroy the strategic hamlets in their region and at the same time to attack South Vietnamese sweeping operations. Between 28 and 30 December 1962, an American aircraft equipped with eavesdropping equipment located a VC radio transmitter. It intercepted radio signals in Ấp Tân Thới in Định Tường Province, where the ARVN 7th Infantry Division was headquartered. The radio intercept and other information obtained by Jim Drummond, Vann's intelligence officer, indicated that the VC used Ấp Tân Thới as a headquarters location. Furthermore, South Vietnamese and American intelligence personnel believed the VC had deployed a reinforced company of about 120 men to protect the transmitter. Confident that the VC unit was no larger than the reported number, the ARVN 7th Infantry Division was instructed to attack Ấp Tân Thới.

An operations plan suited for an attack on a small enemy formation was drafted by Ziegler, an adviser to Dam and the command staff of the 7th Infantry Division. Ziegler's plan, codenamed Operation Đức Thắng 1, called for the South Vietnamese to assault Ấp Tân Thới from three different directions: three rifle companies from the 11th Infantry Regiment, 7th Infantry Division, to move from the north; the Định Tường Civil Guards Regiment to march north from the south in separate columns; and a company of 13 M113 armored personnel carriers with an infantry company on board from the southwest. (Note: The regiment was divided into three separate task forces for the operation against Ấp Tân Thới. Task Force A consisted of the 174th, 842nd, and 892nd companies, and Task Force B was formed by the 171st, 172nd, and 839th companies. The 173rd and 175th companies blocked the far western position side as Task Force C, but it was not committed to battle. Toczek, p. 72) The M113 carriers and the infantry company could act as both a mobile reserve and a reaction force, so it was positioned where it could be shifted to the contact area if the VC began to retreat. In addition, Đạm would also deploy two rifle companies at Bến Tranh airfield (10.421°N 106.336°E), which could be brought to the battlefield by helicopters from the US Army 93rd Transportation Company.

On previous occasions, US intelligence had tracked down the location of VC radio transmitters. However, those were often relocated before the South Vietnamese launched their attacks, so Ziegler privately questioned if the VC had as many as 120 soldiers in Ấp Tân Thới. However, in 1963, the VC had changed its policy from avoiding the ARVN to standing and fighting. The 1st Company, 261st Battalion, and the 1st Company, 514th Battalion, had a total strength of 320 regular soldiers and were positioned in Ấp Bắc and Ấp Tân Thới, respectively, which were separated by a distance of about 1.5 kilometers (0.93 mi). The combined companies were supported by approximately 30 local force soldiers from Châu Thành District who served as scouts, ammunition bearers, litter-bearers, and emergency replacements. Together, elements of the VC 261st and 514th Battalions in Ấp Tân Thới and Ấp Bắc formed a "composite battalion", which was placed under the commander Võ Văn Hoàng (alias Hai Hoàng, born Nguyễn Văn Điều).

Previously, the leadership of the 261st Battalion alternated between Hoàng, a South Vietnamese revolutionary who had returned from North Vietnam after 1954, and Tư Khuê, a native of North Vietnam. Khuê was unpopular among the battalion's soldiers because he was very strict and demanding. However, he was meticulous about details. In contrast, Hoàng was far more relaxed and commanded a high degree of confidence from the soldiers of the 261st Battalion. Thus, due to his strong leadership skills and popularity, Hoàng was selected to take command of VC forces for operations in Ấp Bắc. Most of the soldiers under Hoàng's command were equipped with captured US weaponry, such as M1 Garands, M1 carbines, BAR light machine guns, .30 caliber machine guns, and a single 60mm mortar.

In the days before the battle, Hoàng anticipated a major attack from the South Vietnamese government, as VC intelligence agents in Định Tường had reported the arrival of 71 truckloads of ammunition and other supplies from Saigon, about 65 kilometers (40 mi) to the northeast. In addition, with the information provided by Phạm Xuân Ẩn, a well-connected journalist and undercover VC agent in Saigon, Hoàng's soldiers conducted last-minute anti-helicopter and anti-M113 training by studying US weaponry and South Vietnamese plans and manuals. Furthermore, using radios captured from the ARVN, the VC was able to intercept news of the attack due to unencoded radio communications from the ARVN. The VC also took full advantage of the local terrain by taking up positions in Ấp Tân Thới in the north, along a tree-lined creek in the southeast, and Ấp Bắc in the south. Their positions were well-concealed by trees and shrubs, making them difficult to see from the air and providing good protection from heavy weaponry. To the south and west of Ấp Bắc, the VC dug a series of foxholes in front of an irrigation dike, which afforded them an unobstructed field of fire in the surrounding rice fields. The foxholes were deep enough for one man to stand up or big enough to accommodate a two-person machine gun crew. Behind the foxhole line, the irrigation dike enabled VC units to communicate with each other. In short, the VC enjoyed a great advantage over any attacking force.

== Battle ==
=== The fight begins ===
At 04:00 on the morning of 2 January, VC scouts around the hamlets of Ấp Bắc and Ấp Tân Thới reported hearing the sounds of truck and boat engines, so Hoàng issued an alert order which prompted his troops to pick up their weapons and hurry to their foxholes. Most of the women, children, and older men in both hamlets fled and hid in the nearby swamps as soon as the order was issued.

Thirty CH-21 Shawnee helicopters were needed to airlift the entire ARVN 1st Battalion, 11th Infantry Regiment, but only ten were available. As a result, Đạm could only send one company at a time onto the battlefield. At around 07:00, the first wave of CH-21 helicopters offloaded the first South Vietnamese soldiers. These troops had to hold their positions until the rest of the battalions had arrived. Because of the delay in the arrival of the regular South Vietnamese army units, two Civil Guard battalions of Task Forces A and B, under the command of Định Tường provincial chief Major Lâm Quang Thơ, were left to march against enemy positions by themselves.

As planned, the first Civil Guard battalion of Task Force A started north towards Ấp Bắc. Hoang knew the Civil Guard battalions were approaching, so he instructed his company commander in Ấp Bắc to be ready, as they would fire the first shots of the battle. VC radio operators, using captured US communications equipment, followed the movements of the Civil Guards by monitoring the frequencies the government troops were using. When the leading Civil Guard battalion came within 30 meters (98 ft) of the south end of Ấp Bắc, the VC opened fire from their foxholes and immediately killed the leading company's commander and wounded the task force commander. Task Force A's momentum was stopped when the soldiers of the leading Civil Guard battalion sought shelter in a dike, where they tried unsuccessfully to outflank the VC. During that time, artillery support was ineffective, as Civil Guard forward observers would not stand up to observe the fall of artillery rounds. Consequently, one artillery round after another fell behind VC positions instead of on their foxholes. To make matters worse, Thơ failed to send his second Civil Guard battalion of Task Force B to rescue the first.

North of Ấp Tân Thới, three ARVN 11th Infantry Regiment companies fared no better. They marched south in three separate axes towards their objective. Again, well-concealed VC soldiers of the 514th Battalion allowed their opponents to come within 20 meters (66 ft) before opening fire. Immediately, the South Vietnamese infantrymen were forced to hug the ground. During the next five hours, they managed to launch three major assaults but failed to break the VC's line of defense. By 09:30, the last of Đạm's reserve companies had been airlifted into Bến Tranh, about two hours late because American aircrews were prevented from landing their CH-21 helicopters, known as "flying bananas" for their shape, in the heavy fog that covered Bến Tranh airfield most of the morning. With the ground attacks in the north and south bogged down, Đạm decided to stretch out the defending VC units by attacking the east and the west.

Đạm asked Vann, who was circling the battlefield aboard an L-19 reconnaissance aircraft, to reconnoiter possible landing zones on the east and west sides of Ấp Bắc where additional reinforcements could be inserted to launch their attacks. In response, Vann asked his pilot to make low passes over the trees which covered Ấp Bắc. Although he could not see any VC positions, Vann knew there was a well-fortified position at the south end of the hamlet, due to the impact of the VC's firepower on the Civil Guards since the battle's inception. As Vann's L-19 aircraft flew over the western tree line, the VC watched from their foxholes but held their fire because they knew the aircraft was trying to draw fire in order to mark their positions. Although Vann was suspicious, he decided it was a better landing zone because the area was tranquil despite the heavy fighting elsewhere.

Vann then ordered his pilot to make contact with the other L-19 that was leading the ten CH-21s with the first South Vietnamese reserve company from Bến Tranh airfield. Vann relayed a message to the command pilot of the ten CH-21 helicopters, which were being escorted by a group of five recently deployed UH-1 Huey gunships, armed with 7.62mm machine guns and 2.75-inch rockets and instructed him to land the reserve companies about 300 meters (980 ft) from the western and southern tree lines that covered Ấp Bắc in order to minimize the effectiveness of the VC's .30 caliber machine guns. However, in the early phases of the war, command relationships between US military units were not well-established, and American aircrews tended to disregard the instructions of advisors, especially Vann, who was regarded as domineering. Instead of following Vann's instructions, the command pilot led his helicopters over southern Ấp Tân Thới and along the creek to Ấp Bắc. The US pilots landed their helicopters 200 meters (660 ft) west of Ấp Bắc, where they were hit multiple times by VC machine gun and small arms fire.

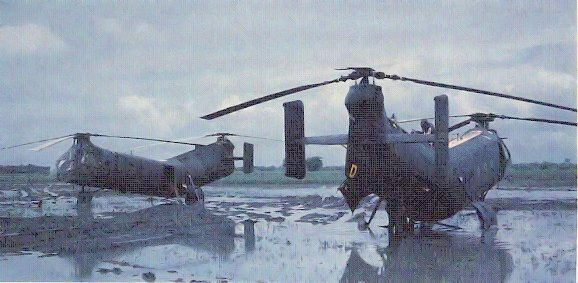
Two downed US CH-21 helicopters

The five UH-1 gunships strafed VC positions with 2.75-inch rockets but failed to suppress the enemy fire. After South Vietnamese soldiers had disembarked from the helicopters, one CH-21 was too severely damaged to get off the ground. A second CH-21 was sent to rescue the crew, but it too was immobilized as soon as it touched the ground. One of the Hueys returned to pick up the crews of the two downed CH-21s. The main rotor was struck by enemy gunfire as it prepared to land. The aircraft flipped over to the right and crashed. Almost simultaneously, a third CH-21 sustained heavy damage and was forced to land on the rice fields a short distance from the first two helicopters. By 10:30, all the South Vietnamese soldiers who had landed on the field were under heavy fire from inside Ấp Bắc and refused to move. Sergeant Arnold Bowers, who had ridden in the first crashed helicopter, raced back and forth to rescue injured American airmen.

=== Arrival of the armored personnel carriers ===
After Bowers had attended to the injured men, he borrowed a field radio from the South Vietnamese to coordinate artillery and airstrikes. Later, two AD-6 Skyraiders arrived over Ấp Bắc and attacked the thatched houses with conventional bombs and napalm. The South Vietnamese soldiers, pinned down on the ground, believed their ordeal was over, so they stood up to see if the VC were retreating from their positions. The VC fired on the exposed soldiers and killed several. Vann then radioed Captain James B. Scanlon—senior adviser to the ARVN 2nd Armored Cavalry Regiment—and told him that four US helicopters had either been destroyed or immobilized about 1,500 meters (4,900 ft) southeast of the regiment's position. Scanlon was told to get his South Vietnamese counterpart, Captain Ly Tong Ba—commander of the 4th Mechanized Rifle Squadron, 2nd Armored Cavalry Regiment, to rescue the trapped South Vietnamese company and the helicopters.

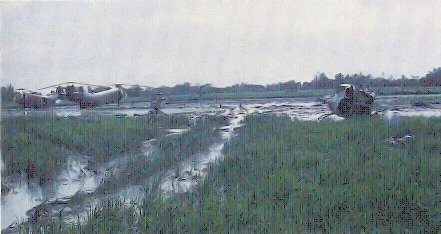
Downed CH-21s and Huey in a rice paddy

Ba asserted that he would not take orders from Americans. He also argued that sending the 13 M113 armored personnel carriers through the Cong Ba Ky Canal would enable the VC to retreat because it might take too much time. An argument broke out between Vann and Ba. Finally, Vann radioed Ziegler at the command post at Tân Hiệp and told him to ask the commander of the ARVN 7th Infantry Division to order Ba to move toward Ấp Bắc immediately. Shortly afterward, Ziegler returned with Dam's permission, and Ba was ordered to move his M113 carriers toward the white smoke rising from the burning hamlet. The American advisers were quietly confident that Ba's M113s could turn the tide of battle; on previous occasions, VC fighters often fled from the battlefield as soon as M113 armored personnel carriers turned up. However, in contrast to previous engagements, VC commander Hoang had ordered the soldiers of the 261st and 514th Battalions to throw everything they had at the South Vietnamese, as retreat through the muddy rice fields would result in certain death.

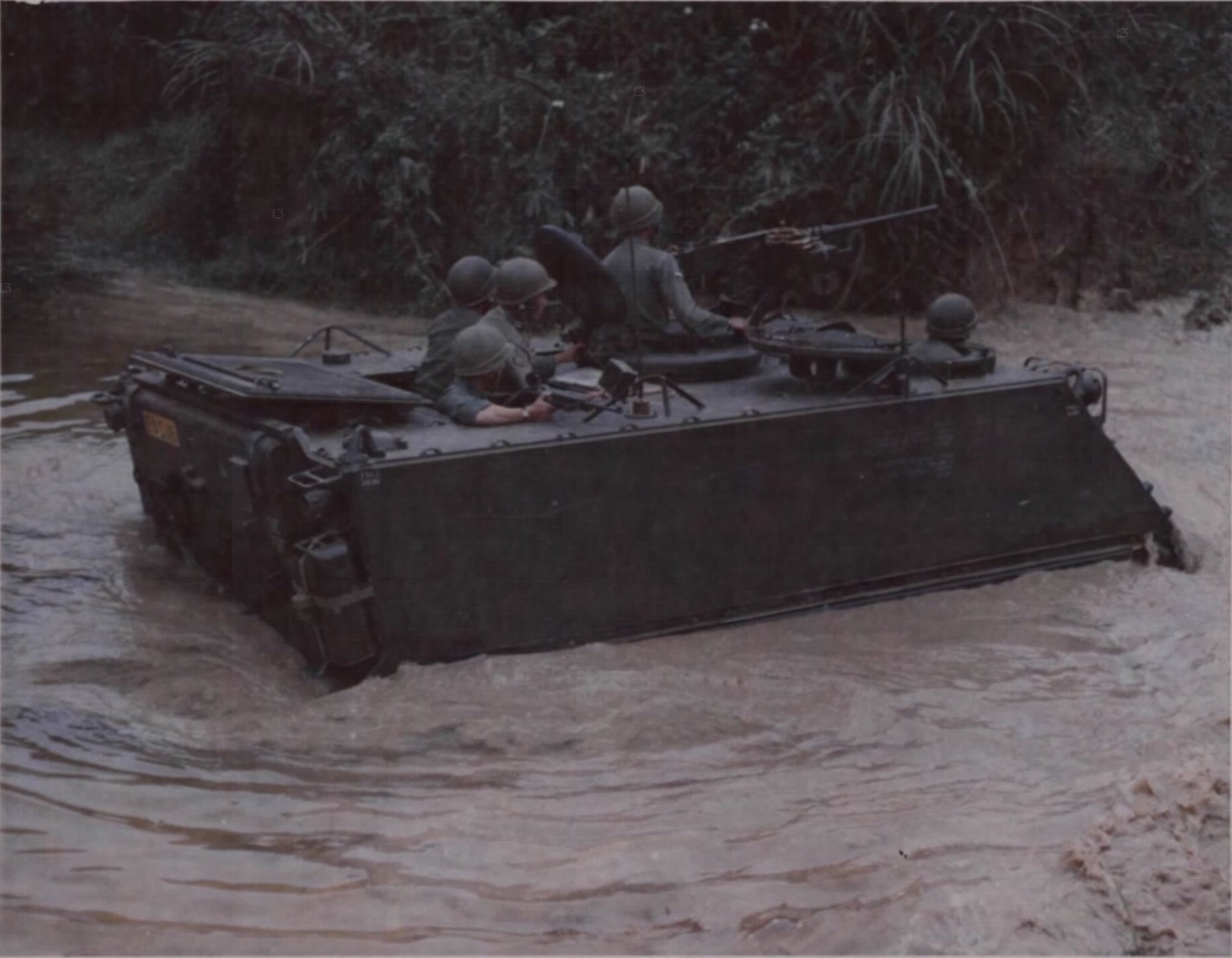
ARVN M113, similar to those used at Ấp Bắc

The South Vietnamese M113s had no problem crossing the generally shallow streams and rivers typical of the Mekong Delta, but the heavy 10-ton M113s became bogged down in the deeper Cong Ba Ky Canal, forcing the crews and the infantry company on board to cut down brush and trees and fill the canal until it was shallow enough for the M113s to cross. The rescue operation was further delayed when Ba tried to obtain proper authorization to advance because he was under orders not to take commands directly from the American advisers. Vann, flying above the armored formation, demanded that Ba advance immediately. Ba replied that he would not take instructions from Americans. When Vann threatened to have Ba shot, he reluctantly continued to advance, although very slowly, toward the entrenched VC.

Meanwhile, a fourth CH-21 returned to Ấp Bắc to rescue the downed helicopter crews. It was also heavily damaged by ground fire and forced to land on the muddy rice field. The VC had set a new record: the battle was the first time they had either destroyed or downed five helicopters within a few hours. At 13:30, Ba's M113 formation finally closed in on the downed helicopters on the west side of Ấp Bắc. The M113s approached the landing zone in a single file instead of in formation. They were immediately fired upon by VC inside the hamlet, who could concentrate their fire on one target at a time. The South Vietnamese M113 gun crews were exposed from the waist up, so they were easy targets for snipers; by the end of the day, 14 South Vietnamese M113 crewmen had been killed due to their exposure. The two leading M113s were able to pull up beside the downed helicopters, but one driver was killed while driving with his head outside the hatch, and Ba was knocked unconscious inside his carrier.

Scanlon, with the help of Bowers, ran forward to aid the wounded men and carry them back to the M113 formation. At that point, South Vietnamese M113 crews backed off while firing their .50 caliber machine guns aimlessly into the sky. When Ba recovered, his company launched a frontal assault on the VC's foxhole line. Just when the M113 crews closed in on their objective, a VC squad leader and his men jumped out of their foxholes and tossed grenades at the lead formation of the attack force. Cohesion and morale among the crews of the armored formation quickly deteriorated as South Vietnamese sergeants, who served as both commanders and machine gunners of the carriers, were killed and were replaced by less experienced, poorly trained men.

In a last-ditch effort to overrun the VC's stronghold, an M113 equipped with a flamethrower was sent forward to within 100 meters (330 ft) of the VC position to fire the western tree line. The flamethrower had a range of up to 200 meters (660 ft), but when the operator fired the device, the flame died after only 30 meters (98 ft). It was later discovered that the crew had mixed the incorrect amount of jelling agent with the gasoline. The final attack mounted by the M113 company failed. At around 14:30, defeated and with their morale sagging, the 4th Mechanized Rifle Squadron disengaged from the fight and withdrew.

By that stage, Vann was frustrated by the Civil Guard soldiers of Task Force B because they appeared to be in no hurry to reach Ấp Bắc, as they searched one house at a time while marching up from the southwest flank of the battlefield. In his final effort to defeat the VC, Vann flew into Tân Hiệp and asked Cao to deploy an airborne battalion on the east side of Ấp Bắc, the most logical retreat route for the Viet Cong. Vann hoped to trap the Viet Cong inside the hamlets by blocking their retreat routes on all sides and annihilating them using an elite battalion of South Vietnamese paratroopers. To Vann's disappointment, Cao strongly opposed the idea and decided to drop one of his airborne battalions behind the M113 formation on the west side instead. Vann accused Cao of wanting to let the VC escape in order to avoid further South Vietnamese casualties. However, Cao argued that a surrounded and well-entrenched enemy would fight more fiercely than a retreating one, so he wanted the VC units inside the hamlets of Ấp Bắc and Ấp Tân Thới to expose themselves by retreating through the eastern side of the battlefield, where he could destroy them with artillery and air power. Cao had also lost confidence in Vann, because Cao felt Vann had placed the lives of many South Vietnamese soldiers at risk to save the lives of a handful of Americans. Major-General Tran Thien Khiem, Chief of the ARVN Joint General Staff, was present during the argument. He did not object to Cao's plan because it was consistent with President Diem's objective to save Vietnamese lives through the Rural Revolutionary Development and Chieu Hoi Programs, which encouraged VC fighters to join the South Vietnamese military.

=== Insertion of the airborne battalion ===
Believing it was useless to continue arguing with Cao, Vann climbed back into his L-19 reconnaissance aircraft and left Tân Hiệp. Throughout the afternoon, he continued to press Cao to deploy the South Vietnamese paratroopers quickly. He was fearful that the battle would be the most significant defeat of South Vietnamese forces up to that point of the war. Cao promised to deploy the second Civil Guard battalion, which had just arrived at the southwest flank of Ấp Bắc, and to drop the ARVN 8th Airborne Battalion at around 16:00 behind Ba's armored personnel carriers. Late in the afternoon, a flight of C-123 Providers, with about 300 South Vietnamese paratroopers aboard, closed in on their objective and quickly drew machine gun fire from the hamlet. The C-123 pilots changed course to avoid the ground fire. However, either the South Vietnamese jumpmaster or the American flight leader did not compensate for the change. As a result, the paratroopers landed right in front of the entrenched VC positions, instead of behind the 4th Mechanized Rifle Squadron and the Civil Guards.

The VC were able to pick off one South Vietnamese paratrooper after another, some as they descended and others when their parachutes became stuck in the trees. Those paratroopers who reached the ground and survived tried to move forward, but the VC soldiers in defilade position fired on the paratroopers exposed in the open rice paddies. Undeterred, the ARVN 8th Airborne Battalion launched small-unit attacks, but on each occasion, they were repelled, and sporadic fighting continued until sundown. By the end of the day, the airborne battalion had lost 19 soldiers killed in action and another 33 wounded. American advisers Captain Fletcher Ware and Sergeant Russell Kopti, who had parachuted in with the South Vietnamese, were wounded. As night fell, Hoang knew that South Vietnamese forces were closing in from three directions. The eastern flank remained open, and he ordered both elements of the 261st and 514th Battalions, exhausted and low on ammunition, to assemble at the south end of Ấp Tân Thới. They evacuated through the rice fields, taking their dead and wounded comrades.

Vann wanted to use a C-47 flare plane to illuminate the rice fields on the eastern flank of Ấp Bắc and Ấp Tân Thới. He wanted to hit the VC with 500 rounds of artillery and destroy them as they retreated. Cao would not approve the use of flares because it could expose the airborne battalion's night defensive positions, and instead ordered 100 rounds of artillery to be fired at a rate of four shells per hour. At 22:00, VC commander Hoang led his two companies out of Ấp Tân Thới and headed for their base camp in the Plain of Reeds, while the local force units left by a different route for their hideouts in the local area. The 1st Company, 261st Battalion, led the column, followed by litter carriers carrying the dead and wounded. The 1st Company, 514th Battalion, covered the tail of the formation, with one of their platoons acting as a rear guard. The wounded VC soldiers were transferred onto sampans at the canal on the east side of Ấp Tân Thới while the rest of the formation marched on. At 07:00 on 3 January, Hoang's men successfully reached their destination without being detected.

== Aftermath ==
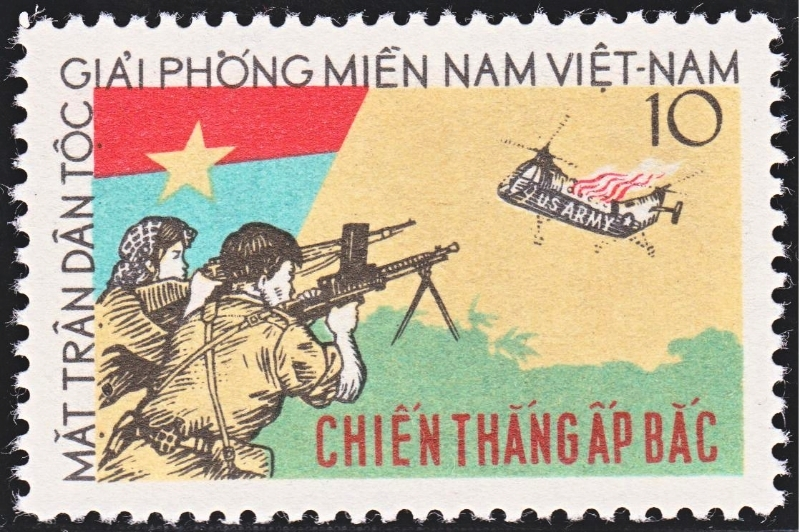
Stamp commemorating the VC victory at Ấp Bắc

On 3 January, Western journalists toured the deserted Ấp Bắc hamlet with American advisors. When reporter Neil Sheehan asked Brig. Gen. Robert H. York what had happened, the general replied: "What the hell's it look like happened, boy? They got away, that's what happened!" Shortly afterward, more than 18 hours too late, the South Vietnamese hit Ấp Bắc with an artillery barrage. The artillery rounds killed another five South Vietnamese soldiers and wounded 14 others; York, Sheehan, and two other Americans narrowly escaped death. Vann, who had made key decisions in the early battle phases, blamed the South Vietnamese for the debacle. "It was a miserable damn performance, just like it always is. These people won't listen. They make the same mistake over and over again in the same way". According to Mark Moyar, in blaming the South Vietnamese, Vann wanted to conceal the Americans' flawed intelligence and poor leadership. He hoped to pressure the South Vietnamese to accept future changes he favored.

General Paul D. Harkins, commander of the Military Assistance Command, Vietnam (MACV), made a much more optimistic assessment of the battle. He considered the operation a major success; after the VC abandoned their positions, the South Vietnamese units captured the hamlets of Ấp Bắc and Ấp Tân Thới. Harkins' evaluation of the battle's success was based on US military doctrine from World War II, in which opposing forces fought a conventional combined arms battle with the objective, on each side, of gaining control of the opponent's territory. The VC, however, was more interested in exposing the weaknesses of Diem's regime and its military. Moyar (2008) argues that Harkins' resolutely optimistic assessments based on conventional doctrine avoided recognizing shortcomings in tactics and battle readiness and in the arrangement under which ARVN commanders and their American counterparts and advisers were operating. Largely because of his attitude, neither the South Vietnamese nor the American commands learned useful lessons from the battle.

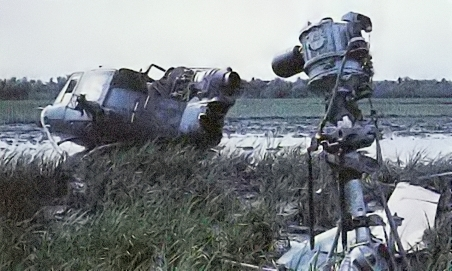
This UH-1 gunship was one of five helicopters shot down during the Battle of Ấp Bắc

The South Vietnamese units participating in the battle took heavy losses in their failed attempt to destroy the VC forces. South Vietnamese casualties included 83 killed in action and at least 100 wounded. The American participants, who included advisors and aircrews, counted three dead and eight wounded. Of the 15 American helicopters sent to support the operation, only one escaped undamaged, and five were downed or destroyed.

For the VC, the Battle of Ấp Bắc marked the first time they stood and fought a large South Vietnamese formation—despite being outnumbered by more than five to one. Against overwhelming odds, the VC had achieved their first de facto victory; they had successfully held off well-equipped ARVN forces supported by artillery and armored units as well as by American airpower. VC casualties were limited to 18 soldiers killed and 39 wounded, even though their positions had been hit by more than 600 rounds of artillery, napalm, and other ordnance released by 13 warplanes and five UH-1 gunships.

Ấp Bắc had far-reaching consequences for the South Vietnamese government and the American involvement in Vietnam. The battle was a milestone for the VC. For individual VC soldiers, the battle demonstrated they could defeat nominally superior ARVN forces, well equipped as they were with up-to-date military hardware and significant support and funding from the United States. Militarily, the morale and confidence of VC commanders and soldiers, who had experienced serious setbacks in the previous year, were greatly boosted. Politically, the VC 261st and 514th Battalions were able to exploit the prestige gained from having inflicted disproportionate losses on the ARVN forces to exercise greater influence in their areas of operations.

Despite the initial success of the Strategic Hamlet Program and the intensified military operations of 1962, the events at Ấp Bắc placed additional pressure on Diem's government because they showed it was not prepared to cope with the resurgence of the VC, particularly in the Mekong delta.

== Notes ==
Footnotes

Citations
