= Tia Sáng (1938 newspaper) =

Vietnamese communist newspaper

Tia Sáng ('The Spark') was a Trotskyist Vietnamese-language newspaper. Tia Sang was the legal organ of the October group. Tia Sang was founded in 1938. It superseded the underground newspaper Tháng Mười ('October'). It was initially a weekly, but was later converted into a daily newspaper in the beginning of the year.
