= Bill Zimmerman (activist) =

American political consultant and author

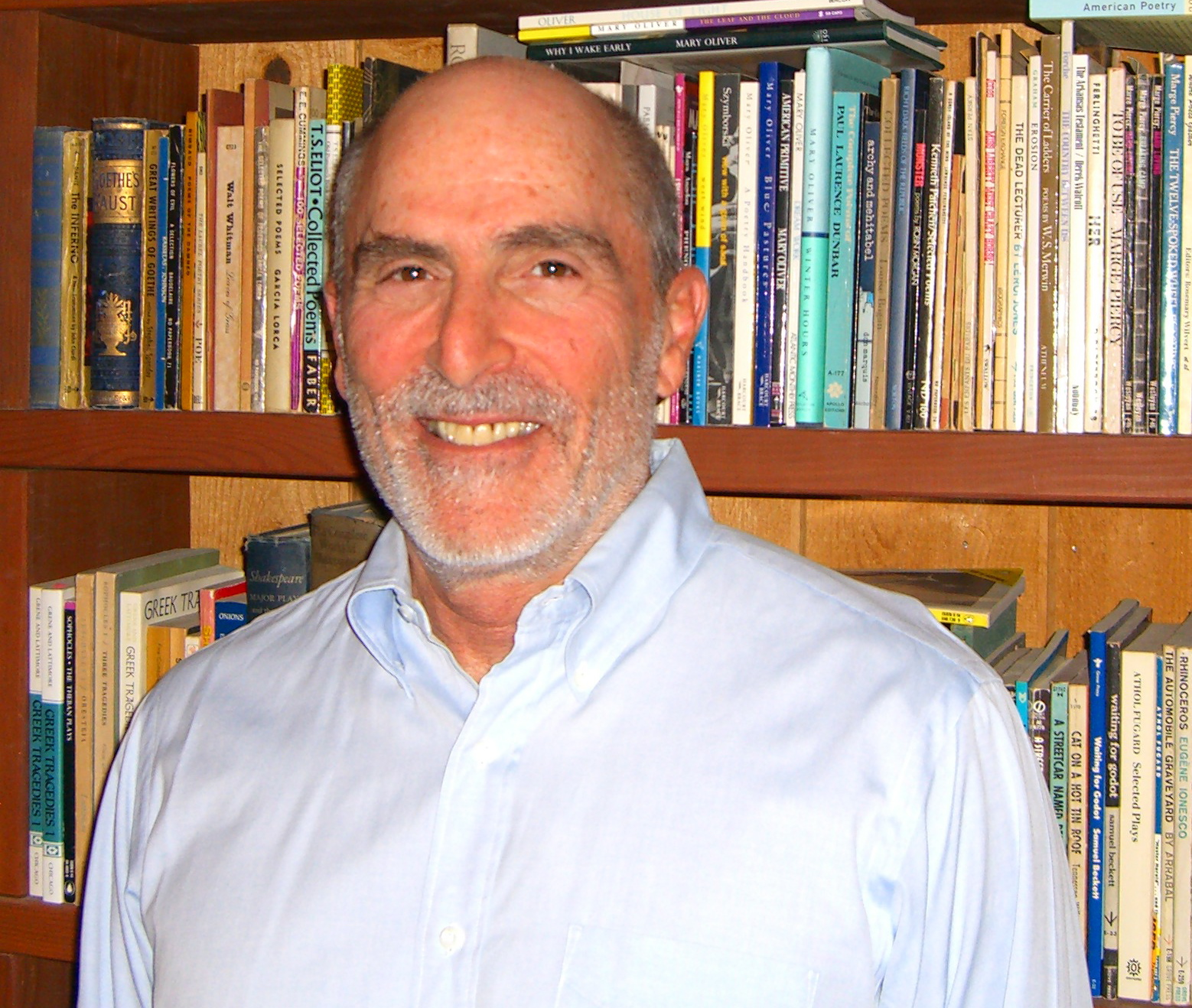
- Born: December 26, 1940 (age 85); Chicago IL
- Other name: William B. Zimmerman
- Education: University of Chicago
- Occupation: Political Consultant
- Years active: 1976-2016
- Known for: Political campaign manager and media consultant, writer/author, political activist.

Bill Zimmerman is an American political consultant and author who was an anti-war activist during the Vietnam War.

== Life ==
Bill Zimmerman worked briefly for the Student Nonviolent Coordinating Committee (SNCC) in Mississippi in 1963, then joined the civil rights and antiwar movements while being trained as a research scientist at the University of Chicago. He received a Ph.D. in 1967 and taught at Brooklyn College (1967–69) and the University of Chicago (1970–71).

Zimmerman left academia when he learned that his research might have military applications. He was a full-time antiwar activist from 1971 to 1975. In 1976, he managed Tom Hayden’s US Senate campaign in California and produced advertising for Cesar Chavez and the United Farm Workers. Subsequently, he founded two national political consulting firms, Zimmerman, Galanty, Fiman & Dixon (1981-1988) and Zimmerman & Markman (1991-2016). Both served Democratic candidates, progressive ballot initiatives, and public interest organizations.

== Political activism ==
While a student at the University of Chicago, Zimmerman marched with Dr. Martin Luther King, Jr. and joined antiwar demonstrations, including the seizure of the university’s administration building in 1966. As a professor at Brooklyn College, he sat in to block US Navy recruiters, helped lead a student/faculty strike, organized students and faculty for the March on the Pentagon, and worked for open admissions for Black and Puerto Rican students.

Leaving science to protest weapons research, Zimmerman helped form Science for the People, a national organization of scientists that questioned the military and commercial applications of new knowledge. He led militant protests at the annual conventions of the American Association for the Advancement of Science (AAAS) in Chicago in 1970 and in Philadelphia in 1971.

Zimmerman was a coordinator of the 1971 Mayday protests in Washington DC. Later in 1971 and throughout 1972, he built Boston-based Medical Aid for Indochina into a national antiwar organization and became its executive director. Zimmerman went to North Vietnam in May 1972 to film civilian bomb damage, producing the documentary, Village By Village, part of which was broadcast by CBS News on Sixty Minutes. Following the bombing of Hanoi's Bach Mai Hospital, Zimmerman led the US effort to rebuild the facility.

When armed American Indian Movement protesters took over Wounded Knee on the Pine Ridge Reservation in early 1973, and FBI agents and US Marshals laid siege to the village, Zimmerman organized an airborne food drop. Three airplanes flying in formation, with Zimmerman piloting the lead aircraft, parachuted 1,500 pounds of food into the village.

In 1974, Zimmerman joined Tom Hayden and Jane Fonda in Santa Monica to help lead the Indochina Peace Campaign, a national organization lobbying Congress to cut off military funding for the government of South Vietnam. Military appropriations were reduced in 1974 and 1975, and the war in Vietnam ended.

In 1974, Zimmerman also partnered with radical civil rights attorney, Joan Andersson, to assist Black Panther co-founder, Huey Newton, then a fugitive, flee to Cuba where he was safe from extradition. The collaboration led to their long-lasting marriage.

In 1981, Zimmerman and Andersson recruited actor Ed Asner, producer Bert Schneider, and other celebrities to join Medical Aid for El Salvador (MAES), an organization that worked to prevent US military intervention and assist civilians injured in areas controlled by the revolutionaries.

== Political consulting ==
In 1977, after managing Tom Hayden’s California U.S. Senate campaign, Zimmerman started Loudspeaker, a political media partnership. In 1980, he managed Barry Commoner’s Citizens Party campaign for the presidency.

In 1981, Zimmerman joined Sidney Galanty and Jack Fiman to form the political consulting and media firm, Zimmerman, Galanty & Fiman, joined in 1984 by Daniel Dixon. They created winning campaigns for Proposition 12, the nuclear freeze ballot initiative in California, Congressman Lane Evans of Illinois, Governor Toney Anaya of New Mexico, Mayor Harold Washington of Chicago, Sen. Gary Hart in the 1984 California presidential primary, and many other candidates.

In 1983, the firm began to film The Jane Fonda Workout videotape series. In 1986, Zimmerman briefly managed California Chief Justice Rose Bird’s ill-fated attempt to remain in office. In 1987, his firm joined Countdown ’87, a public education and lobbying campaign that helped cut off Congressional funding for the Contra War in Nicaragua.

Zimmerman managed the successful Proposition 103 campaign in 1988, the California ballot initiative that lowered auto insurance rates and regulated the state’s property-casualty industry.

With Pacy Markman, he formed Zimmerman & Markman in 1991. Their company helped pass a 1994 ballot initiative that established physician-assisted suicide in Oregon. They worked in El Salvador for presidential candidate, Ruben Zamora, and managed Proposition 63 in 2004, the California ballot initiative that raised taxes on million-dollar earners to expand mental health programs for the homeless. Beyond election work, the firm provided strategic communications for the American Civil Liberties Union, Greenpeace, People for the American Way, and numerous other public interest groups.

In 1996, the firm began a six-year association with George Soros and other funders to reform the nation’s drug laws. With Zimmerman managing and the firm providing advertising, Zimmerman & Markman first passed California Proposition 215 in 1996 to legalize the medicinal use of marijuana, then won similar victories in 1998 in Alaska, Nevada, Washington, and Oregon. In 2000, the company played the same role in passing California Proposition 36, which prevents the incarceration of minor drug possession offenders and mandates state-sponsored drug treatment instead.

In 2003, Zimmerman & Markman became media consultants to the still fledgling on-line organization, MoveOn.org, and over the next five years helped increase their membership from a few hundred thousand to over 3 million by producing some 50 TV commercials that were critical of the Iraq War, President George W. Bush, and Republicans in Congress.

== Books ==
- Zimmerman, Bill (2012). Troublemaker: A Memoir from the Front Lines of the Sixties. New York: Anchor Books. ISBN 978-0-307-73950-6.
- Zimmerman, Bill (1998). Is Marijuana The Right Medicine For You? New Canaan CT: Keats Publishing. ISBN 0-87983 906-6.
- Zimmerman, Bill (1976). Airlift to Wounded Knee. Chicago: Swallow Press. ISBN 0-8040-0691-1

== Articles ==
- Zimmerman, Bill (2017-10-24). "Opinion | The Four Stages of the Antiwar Movement". The New York Times. ISSN 0362-4331.
- Zimmerman, Bill (2017-10-21). "When We Marched on the Pentagon". Truthdig.
- Zimmerman, Bill (1997-10-24). "Nobel Cause: Land-mine activist is from the old school." LA Weekly.
- Johnson, Michael, Tobias, Andrew, and Zimmerman, Bill (1995-6-5). "A New, No-Fault Road Map to Auto Insurance Reform." The Los Angeles Times.
- Zimmerman, Bill and Markman, Pacy (1994-8-24). "Getting a Jump on Health Care." The Los Angeles Times.
- Zimmerman, Bill (1990-11-14). "From Either Side of the Aisle, Prop. 140 Stands for Profound Change." The Los Angeles Times.
- Zimmerman, Bill (1989-3-15). "California's Proposition 103 went against pundit tide." In These Times.
- Zimmerman, Bill (1988-11-15). "Right Message--From Left--Beats Negative Ads." The Los Angeles Times.
- Zimmerman, Bill (1988-11-7). "$60 Million War in California." The Nation.
- Zimmerman, William (1986-11-13). "On Negative Ads." The New York Times.
- Zimmerman, Bill (1986-11-9). "The Campaign That Couldn't Win: When Rose Bird Ran Her Own Defeat." The Los Angeles Times.
