= Vũ Đức Trung =

Vietnamese journalist

- Occupations: Tech executive, journalist, CEO

Vũ Đức Trung is a Vietnamese radio journalist. He is a member of the Falun Gong religious movement.

== Broadcasts ==
Beginning in April 2009, Vũ Đức Trung and his brother-in-law Le Van Thanh broadcast Chinese-language short-wave radio programs on the Sound of Hope Network from their farm in the town of Thach Loi, near Hanoi. On the programs, they told Chinese listeners about Falun Gong, which was banned in China in 1999.

== Arrests ==
Trung and Thanh were arrested in April 2011, prompting a protest by Reporters Without Borders (RSF). The organization charged that the Vietnamese government was doing the bidding of the Chinese government. "Beijing's reach does not stop at China's borders," said RSF spokesman Gilles Lordet. "Reporters Without Borders has learned that the Chinese government successfully pressured the Vietnamese authorities to arrest two people, Vũ Đức Trung and Le Van Thanh."

At first the authorities filed administrative charges against the two men, but later they upgraded the charges to criminal charges.

The Vietnamese government accused Trung and Thanh of "violating international communications regulations and damaging relations between Hanoi and Beijing," said a relative of the men, Pham Thanh Trung, who maintained that the men had not discussed politics on their radio programs, only religion.

A Hanoi lawyer, Trần Đình Triển, said that the criminal charges against the men were unconstitutional and violated international human-rights covenants to which Vietnam was a signatory. He said that under Vietnamese law the two men had only committed an administrative offense that called for a fine, not a criminal offense that could justify imprisonment or confiscation of equipment.

"Using a radio to help other members of Falun Gong is something forbidden in China, but not in Vietnam yet," Triển said. He also dismissed as "an illusion" the claim that the men's broadcasts would harm Vietnamese-Chinese relations. "Vietnam cannot apply the same measures that China applies regarding Falun Gong members," he said. RSF expressed concern that the arrests reflected a growth in the political influence of China over its neighbors.

== Trial ==
Trung and Thanh were originally due to stand trial on 8 April 2011. The trial was postponed and rescheduled for 6 October 2011. It was then postponed again.

== Protests ==
On 8 November 2011, about 30 members of Falun Gong held a demonstration in support of Trung and Thanh. They were detained by police and driven away by bus.

== Conviction and sentencing ==
The two men were convicted in a summary trial on 10 November 2011, by the Supreme People's Court of Vietnam. They were found guilty under a section of the penal code that bans "the illegal transmission of information on a telecommunications network." Their lawyer, Trần Đình Triển, reportedly asked to be shown any law that prohibited broadcasting into China, but received no response. On the same day, Trung and Thanh were sentenced to prison terms of three years and two years respectively for illegally broadcasting to China.

== Responses ==
RSF called the sentences handed down to the two men "harsh and outrageous," stating that "The unlicensed transmission of programmes that were not in Vietnamese nor aimed at a Vietnamese audience should not have been characterized as anything other than an administrative offence. This verdict shows the authorities were conveying the anger of their Chinese counterparts, who were the targets of the criticism expressed in the radio programmes." RSF called on "the international community to put pressure on the Vietnamese government" for the two men's immediate release, which RSF described as part of a "growing crackdown" in Vietnam on journalists and bloggers.

Human Rights Watch (HRW) called the sentences against Trung and Thanh "a violation of freedom of expression. Phil Robertson, HRW's deputy Asia director, said, "Vietnam should not violate human rights and punish its own citizens merely because their activism displeased China."

Falun Gong spokesman Erping Zhang called the day of the men's guilty verdict a "sad day for Vietnam," adding that their broadcasts did "absolutely nothing to harm Vietnamese society or break Vietnamese law." He added, "Sentencing Trung and Thanh to prison in a show trial is shameless and sets a dangerous precedent of the Vietnamese government caving to Chinese Communist Party pressure."
