= Le Van Thanh =

Vietnamese radio journalist and activist

- Occupations: Journalist, activist
- Organization: Sound of Hope Network

Le Van Thanh is a Vietnamese radio journalist and activist. He is a member of the Falun Gong religious movement.

== Broadcasts ==
As early as April 2009, Le Van Thanh and his brother-in-law Vu Duc Trung broadcast Chinese-language radio programs on short-wave frequencies on the Sound of Hope Network from their farm in the town of Thach Loi, on the outskirts of Hanoi. On the programs, they informed their listeners about Falun Gong, which, in 1999, had been banned in China.

== Arrests ==
Thanh and Trung were arrested in April 2011. The arrests prompted Reporters Without Borders (RSF) to protest against the Vietnamese government, claiming they were doing the bidding of the Chinese government. "Beijing's reach does not stop at China's borders," claimed RSF spokesman Gilles Lordet. "Reporters Without Borders has learned that the Chinese government successfully pressured the Vietnamese authorities to arrest two people, Vu Duc Trung and Le Van Thanh."

The initial charges were administrative once against both men, but were later increased to more serious criminal charges.

The Vietnamese government accused the two men of "violating international communications regulations and damaging relations between Hanoi and Beijing," stated a family member of the men, Pham Thanh Trung, who asserted that their radio program had only discussed religion, never politics.

Tran Dinh Trien, a Hanoi lawyer, stated the criminal charges laid against the men were unconstitutional and violated international human-rights to which Vietnam was a signatory. He stressed that according to Vietnamese law the two men were only subject to a fine for a minor administrative offense, not any criminal offense that could lead to imprisonment or confiscation of property.

"Using a radio to help other members of Falun Gong is something forbidden in China, but not in Vietnam yet," Trien has stated. He also dismissed claims from the Vietnamese government that the men's radio broadcasts would harm relations between Vietnam and China. "Vietnam cannot apply the same measures that China applies regarding Falun Gong members," he said. RSF expressed concern that the arrests reflected growing Chinese influence in neighbouring nations.

== Trial ==
Trung and Thanh had an original trial date on April 8, 2011. The trial was postponed and rescheduled for October 6, 2011, and then postponed again. A representative of the U.S. Embassy in Hanoi went to court to attend the October 2011 trial only to discover it had been postponed. The Vietnamese court claimed the October 2011 postponement as a response to a request from the Bureau of Radio Frequency Management.

On October 6, 2011, Freedom House condemned "China's use of diplomatic pressure to engage in further crackdowns on religious minorities and to restrict freedom of expression outside of its borders" and urged Vietnam to drop all charges against Trung and Thanh and to release them immediately.

== Protests ==
Protests in support of Trung and Thanh were staged in early October 2011 in New York City, Washington, D.C., San Francisco, Los Angeles, and Houston, as well as in Australia.

On November 8, 2011, about 30 members of Falun Gong held a demonstration in support of Trung and Thanh. They were subsequently arrested by police and driven away on a bus.

== Conviction and sentencing ==
The two men were convicted on November 10, 2011, by Vietnam's Supreme People's Court. They were found guilty under a statute of the penal code that bans "the illegal transmission of information on a telecommunications network." Their lawyer, Tran Dien Trien, demanded to be shown any law that prohibited radio broadcasting into China, but never received a response. On the same day, Trung and Thanh were sentenced to three years and two years respectively for illegal broadcasting into China.

== Responses ==
RSF had called the sentences laid against the two men "harsh and outrageous," asserting that "The unlicensed transmission of programmes that were not in Vietnamese nor aimed at a Vietnamese audience should not have been characterized as anything other than an administrative offence. This verdict shows the authorities were conveying the anger of their Chinese counterparts, who were the targets of the criticism expressed in the radio programmes." RSF called on "the international community to put pressure on the Vietnamese government" for the men's immediate release, which RSF described as part of a widespread "crackdown" in Vietnam on journalists and bloggers.

Human Rights Watch (HRW) declared the sentences against Trung and Thanh "a violation of freedom of expression". HRW's deputy Asia director, Phil Robertson, said "Vietnam should not violate human rights and punish its own citizens merely because their activism displeased China."

Erping Zhang, a Falun Gong spokesman, called the date of the men's sentencing a "sad day for Vietnam," adding that their radio work did "absolutely nothing to harm Vietnamese society or break Vietnamese law." He added, "Sentencing Trung and Thanh to prison in a show trial is shameless and sets a dangerous precedent of the Vietnamese government caving to Chinese Communist Party pressure."
