= Dwight E. Sargent =

American journalist

- Born: Dwight Emerson Sargent; April 3, 1917; Pembroke, Massachusetts, U.S.
- Died: April 4, 2002 (aged 85)
- Education: Colby College
- Occupation: Journalist
- Spouse: Elaine (died 1993)
- Children: 1

Dwight Emerson Sargent (April 3, 1917 – April 4, 2002) was an American journalist.

Born in Pembroke, Massachusetts, he graduated in 1939 from Colby College and served in Europe with the United States Army during World War II.

Sargent worked at The Portland Press Herald in Maine and The Standard-Times of New Bedford, Massachusetts, before becoming a longtime editorial writer for The New York Herald Tribune.

He was a Nieman Fellow in 1951, studying local government. He was a curator for the Nieman Foundation for Journalism from 1964 to 1972. In 1978, he was appointed national editorial writer for Hearst Newspapers. He was a president for The Society of Silurians.

Sargent died of throat cancer on April 4, 2002.
