= Huy Đức =

Vietnamese journalist, blogger, and author

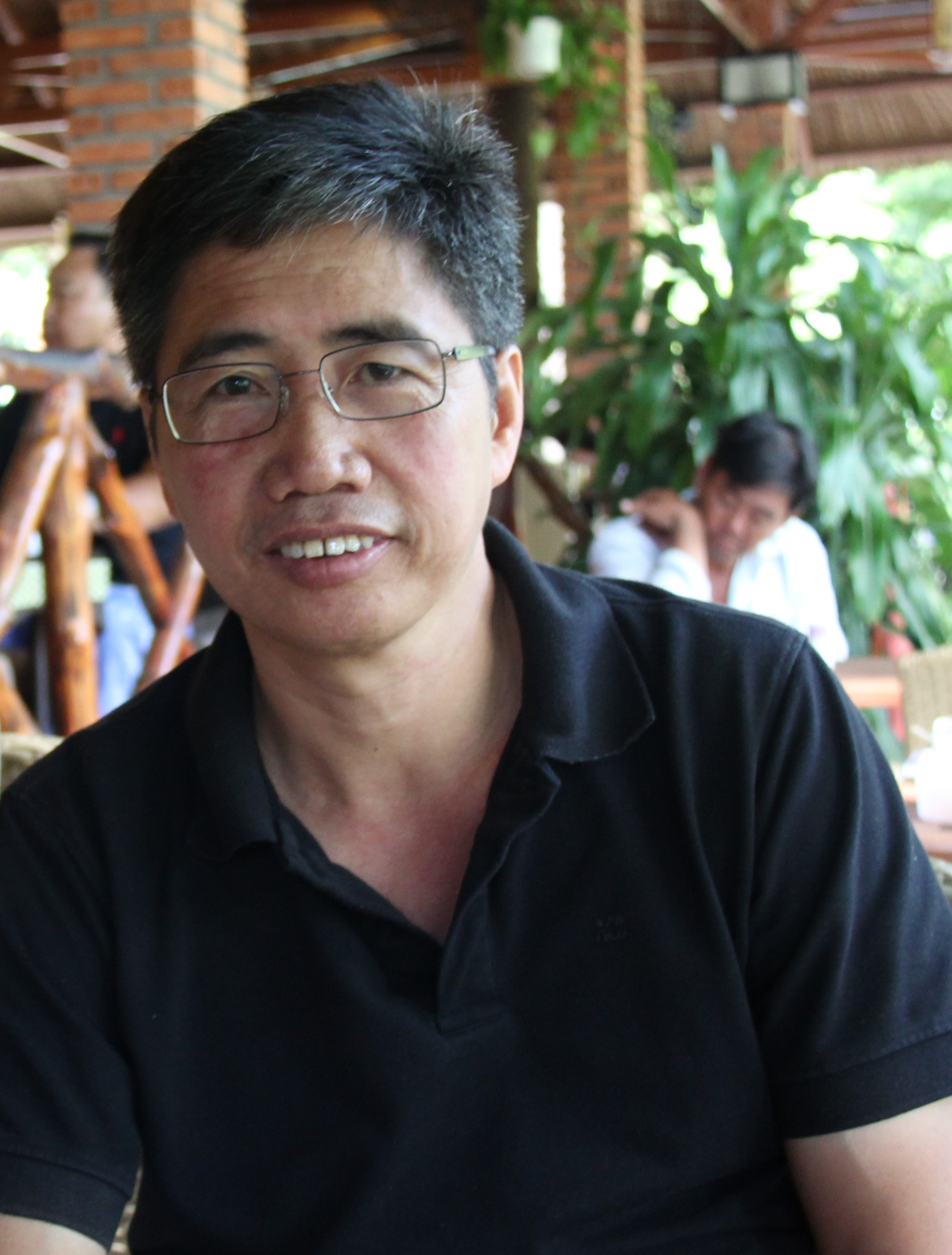
Huy Đức in 2012

Trương Huy San, better known by his pen name Huy Đức, is a Vietnamese journalist, blogger, and author. In 2005–2006 he studied at the University of Maryland under a Hubert H. Humphrey Fellowship. In 2012, he received a fellowship from the Nieman Foundation for Journalism to study at Harvard University in Cambridge, Massachusetts.

== Life and career ==
=== Early life and military career ===
Trương Huy San was born in 1962 in Thạch Hà district of Hà Tĩnh province. His parents are farmers prior to joining the Viet Minh: his father joined the Viet Minh and enlisted during the August Revolution, while his mother served as a volunteer laborer for the force during the Indochina War. San is the fifth child in a family of seven. He grew up on the state-run Thạch Ngọc collective farm and attended a local school from primary level through the seventh grade. He completed his eighth and ninth grades at Lý Tự Trọng School in Thạch Hà District.

While a 10th-grade student at Phan Đình Phùng High School in Hà Tĩnh, San volunteered to join the People's Army of Vietnam and commanded an artillery unit during the 1979 Sino-Vietnamese War; he was the third member of his family to enlist. He later explained that because his birth certificate listed his date of birth as August 20, 1961, he met the legal requirements for enlistment even though he was actually only 17 years old. San studied in the chemical weapons division of the military from 1980 to 1983; he regarded this period as playing a crucial role in his future writing career. He was admitted to the Communist Party of Vietnam in 1982 and stopped participating in party activities in 2006. He was promoted to the rank of sub-Lieutenant at the age of 21 and subsequently to Lieutenant at the age of 23.

In 1984, San and two colleagues were deployed to a military unit in Cambodia during the Cambodian–Vietnamese War. On the Cambodian battlefield, they were responsible for training cooks, nurses and drivers, while also instructing battalion commanders on how to organize military units and engage in combat. He described his time in the neighboring country as "intense" due to the frequent attacks launched by Pol Pot's forces. In 1987, he left the miliary before being promoted to the rank of Captain; he subsequently worked at the Nhà Bè District Party Office office from August 1987 to December 1988.

=== 1988–2009: Career in state run media ===
Before becoming a journalist, San wrote two non-fiction works, titled Dòng sông cụt for Văn magazine and Anh ấy sẽ trở về for the Văn nghệ quân đội magazine, during his time as a cadre in the Communist Party Office of Nhà Bè District. After his writings and short stories appeared in various other newspapers and magazines—most notably Văn Nghệ—he received offers to work for several newspapers.

From December 1988, San started to work for the newspaper Tuổi Trẻ, where he adopts the pen name Huy Đức – a portmanteau of his name and his ex-wife's. He also uses the pen name Trương Ngộ for articles on Tuổi Trẻ Cuoi and Sài Gòn Giải Phóng. During his tenure at Tuổi Trẻ, he became well-known for his investigations on the Đường Sơn Quán case, a scandal involving commercial sex work and police officers in a suburb of Ho Chi Minh City. His investigations drove up newspaper sales for Tuổi Trẻ: when he first joined the staff, Tuổi Trẻ had a circulation of 35,000 copies per issue. Following the newspaper’s coverage of high-profile cases, its circulation climbed to 140,000 copies per issue. During his tenure in Tuổi Trẻ, he conducted interviews with the concurrent prime minister Võ Văn Kiệt. In 2004, Kiệt chose Huy Đức to be a writer for his memoirs.

Năm 1997, after conflict with the editor in chief of Tuổi Trẻ, he worked for the newspaper Thanh Niên for a few months before returning to Tuổi Trẻ until 1999. After leaving Tuổi Trẻ, he and his colleagues decided to attempt running a newspaper. Their first effort involves the acquisition of Nông Thôn Ngày Nay and convert it to a daily political newspaper, which was unsuccessful. Their second effort involves opening a new paper called Diễn Đàn Doanh Nghiệp Cuối Tuần. The paper reportedly generated a buzz and sold well but was shut down by the authorities after three issues. From 2000 until 2005, he wored at Thời báo kinh tế Sài Gòn after being invited by the editor-in-chief of the paper.

In 2005, Huy Đức received the Hubert H. Humphrey fellowship to study at the Philip Merrill College of Journalism of the University of Maryland in College Park for one year, where he pursues public policy and interned at The Washington Times. He spent two months in Santa Cruz to study more English after finishing his program on May 2006. He returned to Vietnam on July 2006 and started working at Sài Gòn Tiếp thị. During his tenure at Sài Gòn Tiếp thị, he was not provided with a press card. (Note: Huy Đức had a press card while working at Tuổi Trẻ, yet he had truoble renewing it.)

In August 2007, he created a blog named Osin – a character in a Japanese television soap opera which became popular in Vietnam, where Osin is the servant who slaved away to earn the money to live her dream. The blog became popular in Vietnam; he recalled in early 2009 that the blog averages around 15,000 views per day. His blog posts often address various sensitive issues in Vietnam – such as the South China Sea dispute between Vietnam and China or the bauxite mining project in the Central Highlands of Vietnam – and are also seen as a test of limits for free expression in Vietnam.

On February 9, 2009, (Note: According to a 2013 interview, Huy Đức said he published the article on February 17, 2009.) he published the article "The border in February" on Sài Gòn Tiếp thị, where he reported his observations at the China–Vietnam border amid the 30th anniversary of the Sino-Vietnamese War; the piece remained on the news outlet’s website for only two hours before being taken down. According to Martin Grossheim, he is one of the few people writing about the taboo topic. In the same year, Sài Gòn Tiếp thị published an article titled “Big Sister of the Prime Minister”, which recounted how a relative of the incumbent Prime Minister was escorted away from the scene when authorities in Bến Cát District, Bình Dương Province, carried out a forced land acquisition—seizing over 280 hectares of rubber plantation in An Tây Commune for the development of an industrial zone. His initial plan was to post the article on his blog, but after consulting the opinion of Tâm Chánh – editor-in-Chief are Sài Gòn Tiếp thị – along with former editors-in-chief of several other Ho Chi Minh City-based newspapers, the publication decided to run the article. Huy Đức recalls that he was followed by security agents while conducting research for the piece; after it was published, the surveillance extended to the headquarters of the newsroom.

On August 2009, he published an article titled "The Berlin Wall" on his Osin blog, in which he celebrated the fall of the Berlin Wall and criticized Soviet officials, arguing that their leadership had led to years of misery for the people of Eastern Europe. The article lead to Sài Gòn Tiếp thị terminating their contract with him. Editor-in-chief Trần Công Khanh explained the reason behind their termination because his postings did not reflect the editorial positions, and he further asserted that their decision was "without direct pressure from the government." He also said that the Central Propaganda Department had "complained" about roughly 100 of his blogs and articles. On his blog, Huy Đức announced that he is no longer a writer for Sài Gòn Tiếp thị from August 25. Since then he became a freelance journalist.

=== 2010–2013: Writing and publishing Bên Thắng Cuộc ===
On February 2010, Huy Đức's blog and email was hacked, leaving him unable to access either service. The Vietnamese government is believed to have been behind these cyberattacks. Following this, he decided to stop blogging, viewing it as a time-consuming endeavor. That same year, he quietly worked on Bên Thắng Cuộc (transl. The Winning Side) a work chronicling the history and politics of Vietnam from the fall of Saigon until the 1990s; Huy Đức said neither the security authorities nor his own friends were aware of the project. He began gathering materials in 1989, conducting interviews in 1997, and focusing on the compilation of the work from 2003 onward.

In May 2012, he received a one-year scholarship from the Nieman program for a number of successful and promising journalists to study at Harvard University. Here, he pursued research areas such as public policy, American literature and Vietnamese history, while continuing to write the book. He published the first volume of The Winning Side in print and e-book on December 12, 2012; followed by the second volume in January 2013. The work attracted attention in Vietnam and abroad for its discussion of politically sensitive topics in Vietnam At least two Vietnamese publishers refused to print this work. Chu Hảo – Director and Editor-in-Chief of Tri Thức Publishing House – told The Wall Street Journal that this is not the right time to publish this book in Vietnam, and stated that the book is "a true history of Vietnam written through the perspective of a professional journalist.".

While studying at Harvard, he published his book Bên Thắng Cuộc (The Winning Side). The two-volume book describes life in Vietnam after the end of the Vietnam War and the reunification of the country. The first volume, Giải Phóng (The Liberation), was published as an e-book in 2012, followed by a hardcover edition. Even before publication he published excerpts and chapters on his Facebook page; the excerpts were widely circulated through the internet. The second volume, Quyền Bính (The Power), was published the same year. The name "The Winning Side" is inspired by a quote from Vietnamese poet Nguyễn Duy: "In every war, whichever side wins, after all/ It's the people who take the fall."

The Vietnamese government has not officially banned the book, but the state-run media has been critical of it. In some cases, the Vietnamese government has seized copies of it and questioned people who had them. Critics have described the book as "perhaps the first critical, comprehensive history of Vietnam since 1975 by someone inside the country." The book ranked number one in the category Southeast Asia History for several weeks on Amazon, and since its publication it is one of the most downloaded electronic Vietnamese books.

Đức is one of many people featured in Ken Burns's series The Vietnam War.

In June 2024, Vietnamese national security police charged him with infringing on national security and due to writing he posted on Facebook, which was deleted on June 2nd with no explanation. He was arrested on the same day and for the same offences as human rights lawyer Trần Đình Triển. He was detained and police received warrants to search his residence and workplace. The 88 Project called the detainment an attack on reformers and freedom of the press, and called on the United States to sanction Vietnamese institutions involved with the charges.

In February 2025, Huy Duc was sentenced to 30 months in prison for Facebook posts that authorities claimed had "negative impacts on social order and safety." His conviction is part of a broader crackdown on dissent in Vietnam, where the government has increasingly targeted online critics and independent journalists.

== Works ==
- Bên thắng cuộc, Los Angeles, California : OsinBook, 2012. ISBN 9781467557917
