= The Silurians Press Club =

American press club

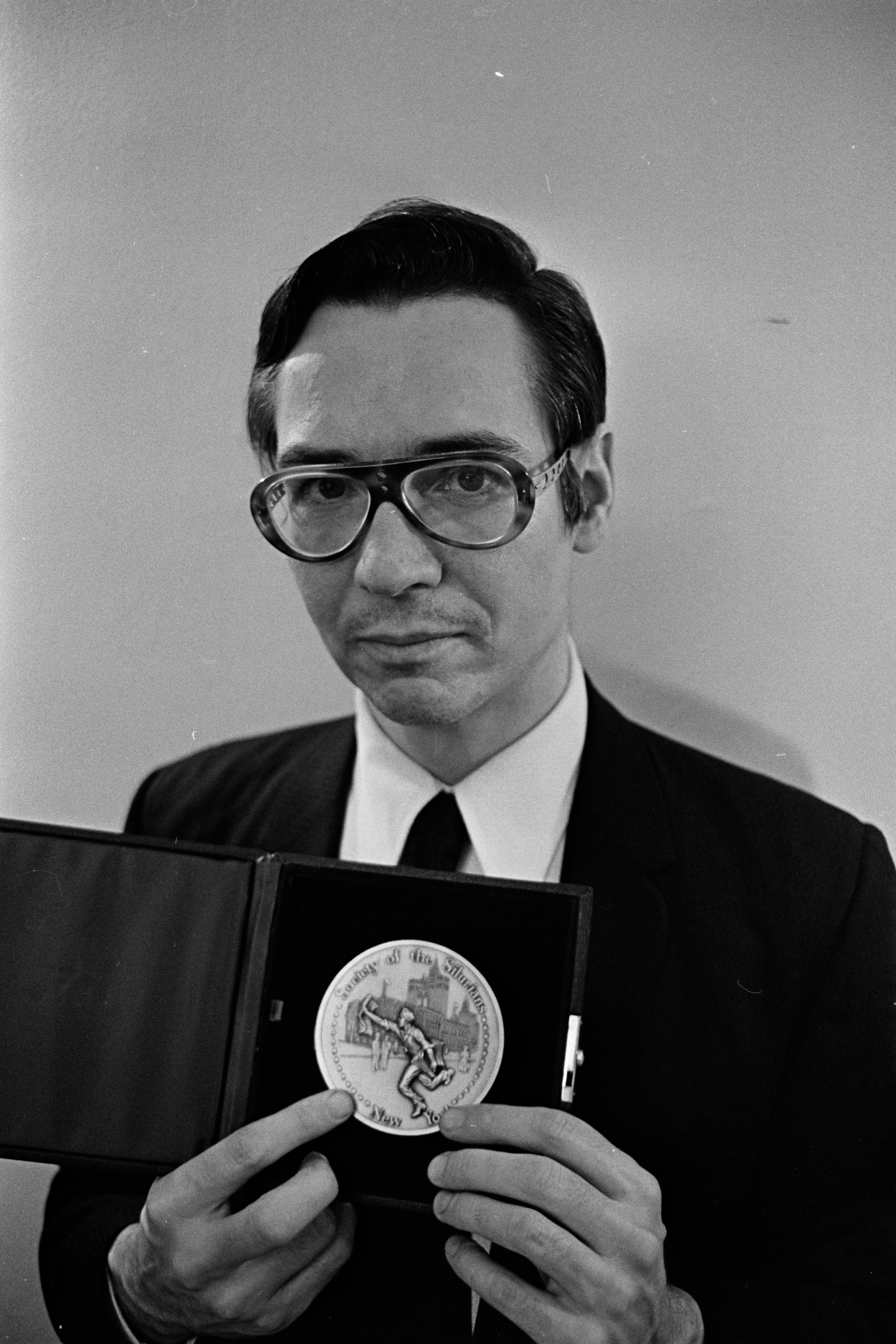
Bill Andrews, cartoonist for the Daily World, with a medal awarded to him by the Silurians for "the overall excellence of his cartoons dealing with Watergate and the Presidency," May 1, 1974

The Silurians Press Club, also known as The Society of the Silurians, is an American organization composed of veteran journalists based in New York City. It is one of the oldest press clubs in the country, and honors journalistic work about and within the city. The club holds well attended presentations at the National Arts Club, which are open to members and non-members.

== History ==
The press club was founded in 1924, and consisted of journalists with at least 25 years of experience in the field. Membership now requires 9 years experience in print, broadcast or digital media, or photojournalism. In 1953, the group had more than 500 members. The same year, the group formed a committee, headed by Reuben Maury, protesting New York press limitations and advocating for the protection of freedom in the New York press. The group published a book in 1974 titled Shoeleather and Printers' Ink, to mark the fiftieth anniversary of the organisation. The book is a collection of stories and news coverage. Dwight E. Sargent was a former president of the society.

== Awards ==
The organisation is known for giving journalism related awards. The group created The Peter Kihss Award to honor American reporter Peter Kihss, regarded by the organization as "the world's greatest reporter". The club also awards the Silurian Excellence in Journalism Award, Lifetime Achievement Award, and scholarships in journalism.
