= Nieman Foundation for Journalism =

Journalism institution at Harvard University

Logo of the Nieman Foundation

The Nieman Foundation for Journalism is the primary journalism institution at Harvard University.

== History ==
It was founded in February 1938 as the result of a $1.4 million bequest by Agnes Wahl Nieman, the widow of Lucius W. Nieman, founder of The Milwaukee Journal. Scholarships were established for journalists with at least three years' experience to go back to college to advance their work. She stated the goal was "to promote and elevate the standards of journalism in the United States and educate persons deemed specially qualified for journalism."

== Programs ==
=== Nieman Fellows ===
The Nieman Foundation is best known as home to the Nieman Fellows, a group of journalists from around the world who come to Harvard for a year of study. Many noted journalists, and from 1959, also photojournalists, have been Nieman Fellows, including John Carroll, Dexter Filkins, Susan Orlean, Robert Caro, Hodding Carter, Michael Kirk, Alex Jones, Anthony Lewis, Robert Maynard, Allister Sparks, Stanley Forman, Hedrick Smith, Lucia Annunziata, Jonathan Yardley, Philip Meyer, Howard Sochurek and Huy Duc. It is considered the most prestigious fellowship program for journalists; Nieman Fellows have collectively won 101 Pulitzer Prizes.

=== Nieman Reports ===
The foundation is also the home of Nieman Reports, a website and quarterly print publication on journalism issues. The journal was founded in 1947.

==== Nieman Watchdog ====
In 2004, the Foundation launched Nieman Watchdog, a watchdog journalism website intended to encourage more aggressive questioning of the powerful by news organizations. In 2012 it became a project of Nieman Reports.

=== Nieman Lab ===
In 2008, the foundation created the Nieman Journalism Lab or Nieman Lab, an effort to investigate future models that could support quality journalism.

In March 2026, Nieman Journalism Lab published an interview with Bryan Jacobs, a Silicon Valley CTO who created an autonomous AI agent that independently edited and created articles on the English Wikipedia until it was indefinitely blocked by editors for operating as an unapproved bot and generating content with large language models. The article, titled "'I was surprised how upset some people got': A conversation with the creator of TomWikiAssist, the bot that edited Wikipedia", examined the incident in the context of the English Wikipedia community's concurrent adoption of a policy prohibiting the use of LLMs to generate or rewrite article content, which passed by a 40–2 margin. Jacobs described his surprise at the strength of the reaction. They characterized some editors as "disoriented and terrified" by the AI's activity. At the same time, the reporting highlighted broader questions about AI's role in knowledge production, the enforcement challenges of distinguishing automated from human contributions, and tensions between traditional editorial norms and emerging tools. The piece drew significant attention in discussions surrounding Wikipedia's approach to artificial intelligence.

=== Narrative journalism ===
For several years, ending in 2009, the foundation sponsored the annual Nieman Conference on Narrative Journalism, the largest conference of its kind, which attracted hundreds of writers, filmmakers, and broadcasters to Boston. The narrative program now consists of a writing seminar for Fellows, and a public website, Nieman Storyboard, which covers storytelling across media.

== Awards based at Nieman Foundation ==
Several prestigious literary or journalism awards are based at the Nieman Foundation. They include three given in connection with the Columbia University School of Journalism:

- The J. Anthony Lukas Book Prize ($10,000, "recognizes superb examples of nonfiction writing that exemplify literary grace, a commitment to serious research and social concern")
- The Mark Lynton History Prize ($10,000, awarded to the "book-length work of history, on any subject, that best combines intellectual or scholarly distinction with felicity of expression")
- The J. Anthony Lukas Work-in-Progress Award ($30,000, "given annually to aid in the completion of a significant work of nonfiction")

Other awards based at Nieman include:

- The Worth Bingham Prize for Investigative Reporting ($20,000, "honors investigative reporting of stories of national significance where the public interest is being ill-served")
- The I.F. Stone Medal for Journalistic Independence ("to a journalist whose work captures the spirit of independence, integrity, courage, and indefatigability that characterized I. F. Stone's Weekly")
- The Louis Lyons Award for Conscience and Integrity in Journalism ("recognizes displays of conscience and integrity by individuals, groups or institutions in communications")
- The Taylor Family Award for Fairness in Newspapers ($10,000, "recognizes fairness in newspaper reporting")

== Curators ==
The leader of the Nieman Foundation is known as its "curator" — a holdover from a brief moment after Agnes Wahl Nieman's death, when her gift was to be used to build a microfilm library of quality journalism. The foundation has appointed eight curators:

- Archibald MacLeish, 1938–1939
- Louis M. Lyons (Nieman Fellow class of 1939), 1939–1964
- Dwight E. Sargent (Nieman Fellow class of 1951), 1964–1972
- James C. Thomson Jr., 1972–1984
- Howard Simons (Nieman Fellow class of 1959), 1984–1989
- Bill Kovach (Nieman Fellow class of 1989), 1989–2000
- Robert H. Giles (Nieman Fellow class of 1966), 2000 – June 2011
- Ann Marie Lipinski (Nieman Fellow class of 1990), 2011–2025
- Henry Chu (Nieman Fellow class of 2015), 2025 – (interim)
