= List of ambassadors of Vietnam to China =

Ambassador of Vietnam to China
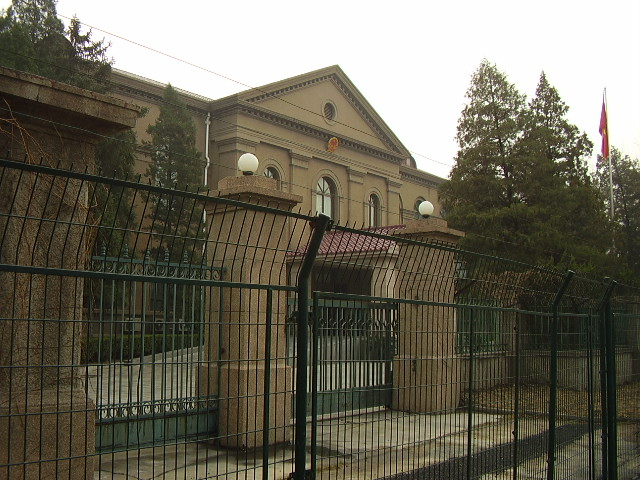
- Incumbent; Phạm Thanh Bình since July 2025
- Inaugural holder: Hoàng Văn Hoan
- Formation: January 1, 1950

The Vietnamese ambassador in Beijing is the official representative of the Government in Hanoi to the Government of the People's Republic of China.

== List of ambassadors ==
Diplomatic agreement/designated/Diplomatic accreditation	Ambassador	Observations	List of prime ministers of Vietnam	Premier of the People's Republic of China	Term end
January 18, 1950		The governments in Hanoi and Beijing established diplomatic relations.	Hồ Chí Minh	Zhou Enlai	
January 1, 1950	Hoàng Văn Hoan		Hồ Chí Minh	Zhou Enlai	January 1, 1957
January 1, 1958	Nguyễn Khang (politician)		Phạm Văn Đồng	Zhou Enlai	January 1, 1958
January 1, 1959	Trần Tử Bình	1963 Vietnamese Ambassador to China Tran Tu Binh, Republic has appointed Tran Tu Binh to replace Nguyen Khang as Ambassador Extraordinary and Plenipotentiary to China. Tran Tu Binh left here for Peking yesterday.	Phạm Văn Đồng	Zhou Enlai	January 1, 1967
May 13, 1967	Ngô Minh Loan	was an alternate member of the VWP CC 1960–76, and Vietnamese ambassador to Beijing 1967–69.	Phạm Văn Đồng	Zhou Enlai	November 26, 1969
January 2, 1970	Ngô Thuyền		Phạm Văn Đồng	Zhou Enlai	
January 1, 1973	Tran Binh	Charge d'affaires	Phạm Văn Đồng	Zhou Enlai	
July 5, 1976	Nguyễn Trọng Vĩnh	Nguyen Trong Vinh	Phạm Văn Đồng	Zhou Enlai	January 1, 1987
February 17, 1979	Sino-Vietnamese War	China's War with Vietnam, 1979 On 3 July a Chinese note to the Vietnamese embassy in Beijing announced that remaining aid to Vietnam had been cancelled, an act which was seen by Pravda as anattempt to coerce Vietnam into surrendering to the great power ambitions	Phạm Văn Đồng	Hua Guofeng	March 16, 1979
March 16, 1990	Đặng Nghiêm Hoành	Hoanh, Dang Nghiem (* November 24, 1934 in Hon Gai)	Đỗ Mười	Li Peng	January 1, 1997
December 29, 1997	Bùi Hồng Phúc		Phan Văn Khải	Li Peng	
January 27, 2003	Trần Văn Luật		Phan Văn Khải	Wen Jiabao	
September 19, 2008	Nguyễn Văn Thơ		Nguyễn Tấn Dũng	Wen Jiabao	
2015	Đặng Minh Khôi		Nguyễn Tấn Dũng	Li Keqiang	
2019	Phạm Sao Mai		Nguyễn Xuân Phúc	Li Keqiang	
2025	Phạm Thanh Bình	Following his appointment as Ambassador Extraordinary and Plenipotentiary of the Socialist Republic of Vietnam to China and Micronesia in 2024. He is the first official envoy to present his credentials to the Micronesian government.	Phạm Minh Chính | Lê Minh Hưng	Li Qiang	

== See also ==
- China–Vietnam relations
