= Peter Kihss =

American journalist (1912–1984)

- Kihss in 1963
- Born: Peter Frederick Kihss; August 25, 1912; Brooklyn, New York, U.S.
- Died: December 28, 1984 (aged 72); Jamaica Estates, Queens, New York, U.S.
- Education: Columbia University Graduate School of Journalism
- Occupations: Journalist; reporter; editor
- Years active: 1933–1982
- Employer: The New York Times (1952–1982)
- Children: 2

Peter Frederick Kihss (August 25, 1912 – December 28, 1984) was an American reporter for The New York Times and other news organizations for nearly half a century until his retirement in 1982. Kihss was known for his reporting on a wide range of topics, including immigrants, state and city governments, crime, the weather and other subjects.

== Early life ==
Peter Frederick Kihss was born in Brooklyn, New York, to Latvian immigrants on August 25, 1912. He was encouraged to become an engineer by his father, but chose to pursue journalism instead, saying "[it] was an opportunity to do good for somebody". He graduated from the Columbia University Graduate School of Journalism in 1932.

== Career ==
Kihss's career in journalism began in 1933, working at The Associated Press, The Washington Post, New York World-Telegram, New York Herald Tribune, and for 30 years at The New York Times. While at The Associated Press, he was an editor, a role he disliked. He quit shortly afterwards and he became a foreign correspondent in South America for The New York Times. On returning 10 months later, he worked at The Washington Post. He moved back to New York in 1936, becoming a journalist at New York World-Telegram and New York Herald Tribune. He rejoined The New York Times on January 6, 1952. He retired in 1982. Two years after his retirement, a $5,000 journalism award was established in his honor by the Fund for the City of New York, for which he was the first recipient.

== Death and legacy ==
Kihss died on December 28, 1984, of a heart attack at his house in Jamaica Estates, Queens, at the age of 72. Then mayor of New York City, Ed Koch, called Kihss "one of the most factual and thoughtful of reporters". He was often referred to as the "world's greatest reporter". Sydney Schanberg for The New York Times referred to Kihss as a "master craftsman", praising his mentoring of younger, inexperienced journalists. Schanberg also called Kihss "one of the greats" of contemporary journalism. He was survived by his wife, Alice, and two children. The Society of Silurians established The Peter Kihss Award in his honor, an award given to journalists who mentor newer ones.

== Awards and nominations ==
In 1933, Kihss was awarded the Pulitzer Traveling Scholarship. In 1966, Kihss received a special mention by the Society of the Silurians for his work covering the northeast blackout of 1965. In 1971, Kihss was honored by the Society of the Silurians, receiving a gold quill marking his "continued distinguished journalistic work" for more than 25 years. He also received the Silurians' Quarter-Century News Award. In 1974, Kihss received Columbia's Journalism Alumni Award. Kihss was nominated for a Pulitzer Prize four times, but never won.
