= Trần Đình Triển =

Vietnamese lawyer (born 1959)

Trần Đình Triển (born 1959) is a Vietnamese lawyer known for his work representing human rights activists. In 2024, he was arrested after criticising the Chief Justice of the Supreme People's Court of Vietnam, and was subsequently sentenced to three years imprisonment in January 2025.

== Legal career ==
In 2006, Triển founded Vì Dân (lit. 'for the people'), a law firm based in Hanoi; he had worked as a lawyer for over 40 years at the time of his arrest in 2024. Between 2013 and 2018, he served as the deputy chair of the Hanoi Bar Association. Triển was a critic of the Vietnamese judicial system, and in 2024 criticised decisions overseen by the then-Chief Justice of the Supreme People's Court, Nguyễn Hòa Bình, including banning the families of defendants from attending trials, and forbidding journalists and lawyers from recording open trials. Under Bình, Triển also criticsed the Supreme People's Court for declining a request to reinvestigate the 2009 death sentence issued to Hồ Duy Hải, despite widely reported irregularities in the police's investigation into the crime.

Triển frequently represented human rights activists in criminal trials. In 2011, he was a member of the defence team of Cù Huy Hà Vũ, a legal activist who had been arrested and imprisoned on anti-government propaganda charges. The trial received widespread attention in Vietnam, and Triển alongside the rest of Vu's legal team notably walked out of the courtroom in protest after the judge refused multiple requests to release documents to the defence. In 2013, Triển represented Đoàn Văn Vươn, who had been arrested alongside two relatives after using home-made bombs and shotguns to resist a land grab, injuring seven soldiers and police officers. Triển stated that Vuon had only used force after exhausting all legal means against the proposed land confiscation.

In January 2025, Triển's licence to practice law was suspended.

== Arrest and trial ==
On 1 June 2024, Triển was arrested and charged with "infringing upon the interests of the state" under article 331 of Vietnam's penal code. Triển's indictment alleged that between 23 April and 9 May 2024, Triển had published three posts on his personal Facebook page criticising Nguyễn Hòa Bình, the then-Chief Justice of the Supreme People's Court. The Court subsequently released a statement describing Triển's posts as containing "untruthful and fabricated contents" and accusing him of offending the "dignity, honour and prestige" of Bình and the Court itself. Triển's arrest occurred on the same day as human rights activist Huy Đức, who was arrested for the same offence after making a post on Facebook.

Triển's trial started on 9 January 2025 at the People's Court of Hanoi. Triển and his lawyers argued that he had been exercising his right to free speech, and that none of his posts had violated the law. On 10 January, the trial panel found that Triển had negatively impacted "security, order and social safety", and he was sentenced to three years imprisonment.

Human Rights Watch called on the Vietnamese government to immediately drop all charges against Triển and to release him.
