= China–Vietnam relations =

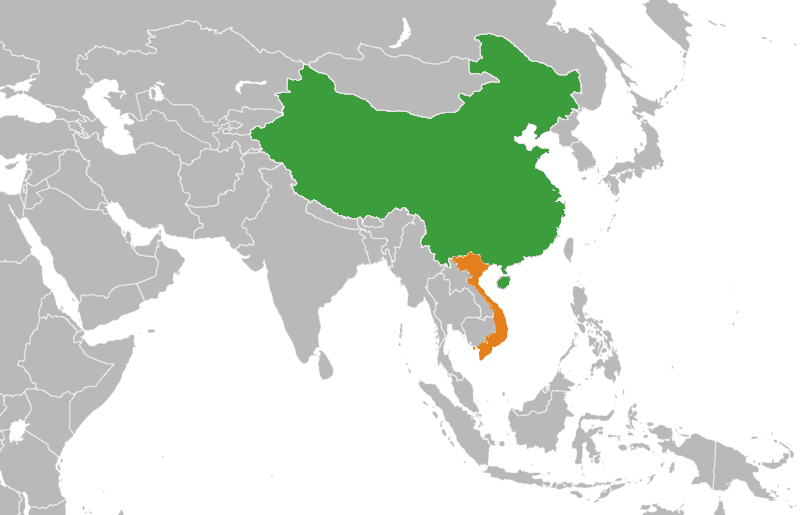
- China: Vietnam

Diplomatic mission
- Chinese Embassy, Hanoi: Vietnamese Embassy, Beijing

Envoy
- Ambassador He Wei: Ambassador Pham Sao Mai

Relations between Vietnam and China (Chinese: 中越关系, pinyin: Zhōng Yuè Guān Xì; Vietnamese: Quan hệ Việt–Trung) have been extensive for millennia, with Northern Vietnam especially under heavy Sinosphere influence during historical times. Despite their Sinospheric and socialist background, centuries of conquest by modern China's imperial predecessors as well as modern-day tensions have made relations occasionally wary. The modern relationship has been marked with extensive economic, political and cultural ties, as well as territorial disputes in the South China Sea.

China and Vietnam have lengthy historical connections, including nearly a thousand years during which Vietnam was a dependency of China. Vietnam emerged from the disintegration of China's Tang dynasty in the 900s. Subsequently, China supported the Trần dynasty while the Ming dynasty established a tributary relationship with Vietnam. In 1884, after Chinese defeat in the Sino-French War, Vietnam under the Nguyễn dynasty became a protectorate of France, marking the end of formal Chinese influence on Vietnam. During the Cold War, the People's Republic of China (PRC) ruled by the Chinese Communist Party (CCP) assisted North Vietnam and the Communist Party of Vietnam (CPV) during the Vietnam War whilst the Taiwan-based Republic of China (ROC) was allied with South Vietnam.

Following the fall of Saigon in 1975 and the subsequent Vietnamese reunification as the Socialist Republic in 1976, relations between the two countries started to deteriorate. Vietnam ousted the Khmer Rouge, a party that China propped up which had become genocidal, from power in Cambodia. China invaded Vietnam in February 1979, beginning the Sino-Vietnamese War. China perceived Vietnam's domination over Indochina from Vietnam's historical legacy (emperor Minh Mạng) whilst Vietnam desired Vietnamese-friendly neighbors (Laos and Cambodia) on its immediate western borders. Cross-border raids and skirmishes ensued, in which China and Vietnam had a series of border and naval clashes from 1979 to 1990. The two countries officially normalized diplomatic ties in 1991.

China and Vietnam share a 1,281 kilometres (796 miles) border. The two countries remain in dispute over political and territorial issues in the South China Sea. Since the normalization of diplomatic ties, both sides have since worked to improve their diplomatic and economic relations. The two countries have been striving for restraint as well as present and future stability. The two countries signed a comprehensive strategic partnership in 2008. China and Vietnam maintain extensive economic ties, with the Vietnamese economy becoming increasingly connected with China's. As two ruling communist parties of socialist states, the CCP and CPV maintain close political and ideological ties.

== History ==
China and Vietnam have lengthy historical connections, including nearly a thousand years during which Vietnam was a dependency of China. As a result, Vietnam was influenced by Chinese literature, scholarship, modes of family organization, civil administration, and bureaucratic practices.

=== Early history ===
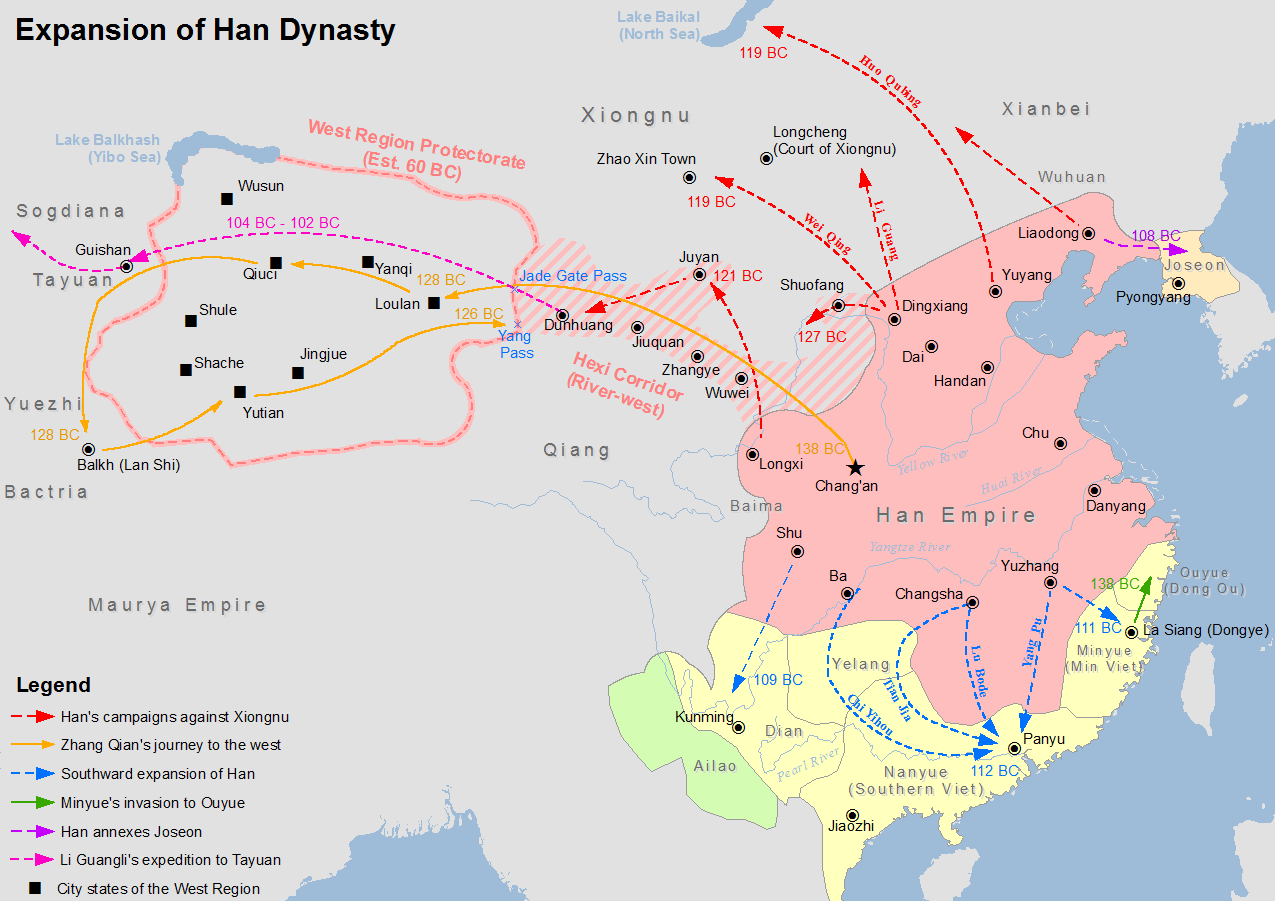
Southward expansion of the Han dynasty, including its annexation of Northern Vietnam in 111 BC

The earliest reference of the proto-Vietnamese in Chinese annals was the Lạc (Chinese: Luo), Lạc Việt, or the Dongsonian, an ancient tribal confederacy of perhaps polyglot Austroasiatic and Kra-Dai speakers who occupied the Red River Delta in northern Vietnam. China and Vietnam had contact since the Chinese Warring States period and the Vietnamese Thục dynasty in the 3rd century BC (disputed), as noted in the 15th-century Vietnamese historical record Đại Việt sử ký toàn thư. Between 111 BC and 939, Vietnam was subject to three separate periods of imperial Chinese domination although it successfully asserted a degree of autonomy with the Khúc clan in 905 and later independence with the establishment of the Ngô dynasty in 939. In 968, Đinh Bộ Lĩnh declared himself emperor of the Đinh dynasty, however Vietnam nominally remained a vassal of China until the 19th century. Vietnam was again ruled by China under the Ming dynasty from 1407 until the establishment of the Lê dynasty in 1428.

According to the old Vietnamese historical records Đại Việt sử ký toàn thư and Khâm Định Việt Sử Thông Giám Cương Mục, An Dương Vương (Thục Phán) was a prince of the Chinese state of Shu (蜀, which shares the same Chinese character as his surname Thục), sent by his father first to explore what are now the southern Chinese provinces of Guangxi and Yunnan and then to move their people to what is now northern Vietnam during the invasion of the Qin dynasty.

Some modern Vietnamese scholars believe that Thục Phán came upon Âu Việt, which is now northernmost Vietnam, western Guangdong, and southern Guangxi Province, with its capital in what is today Cao Bằng Province). After assembling an army, he defeated Hùng Vương XVIII, the last ruler of the Hồng Bàng dynasty, in 258 BC. He proclaimed himself An Dương Vương ("King An Dương"), renamed his newly acquired state from Văn Lang to Âu Lạc and established the new capital at Phong Khê (now Phú Thọ, a town in northern Vietnam), where he tried to build Cổ Loa Citadel, the spiral fortress approximately ten miles north of his new capital.

Han Chinese migration into Vietnam has been dated back to the era of the 2nd century BC, when Qin Shi Huang first placed northern Vietnam under Chinese rule (disputed), Chinese soldiers and fugitives from Central China have migrated en masse into northern Vietnam since then and introduced Chinese influences into Vietnamese culture. The Chinese military leader Zhao Tuo founded the Triệu dynasty, which ruled Nanyue in southern China and northern Vietnam. The Qin governor of Canton advised Zhao to found his own independent kingdom since the area was remote, and there were many Chinese settlers in the area. Under the Eastern Han dynasty, the Chinese prefect of Jiaozhi, Shi Xie, ruled Vietnam as an autonomous warlord and was posthumously deified by later Vietnamese emperors. Shi Xie was the leader of the elite ruling class of Han Chinese families that immigrated to Vietnam and played a major role in developing Vietnam's culture.

=== Imperial period ===
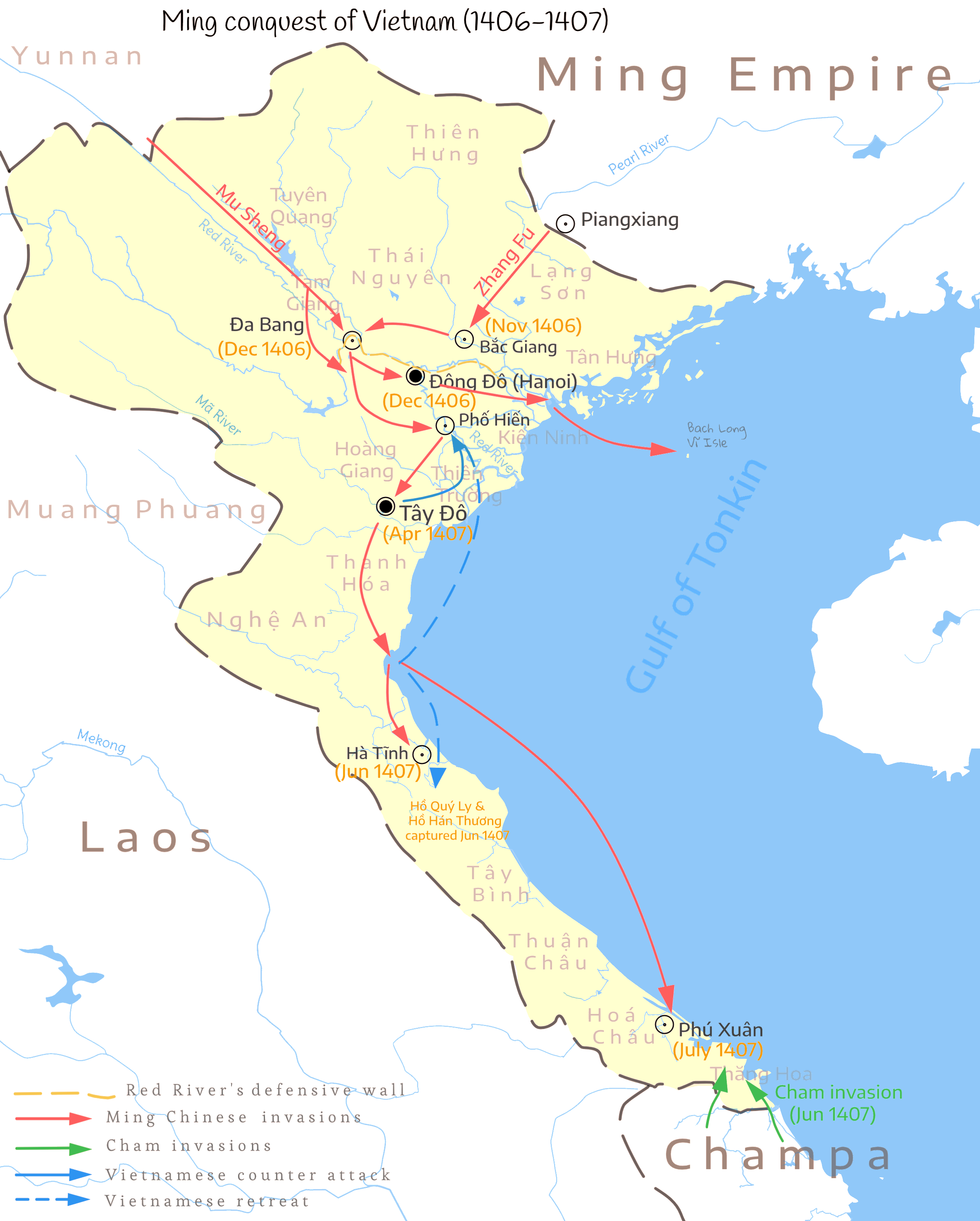
Ming conquest of Vietnam in 1406–1407

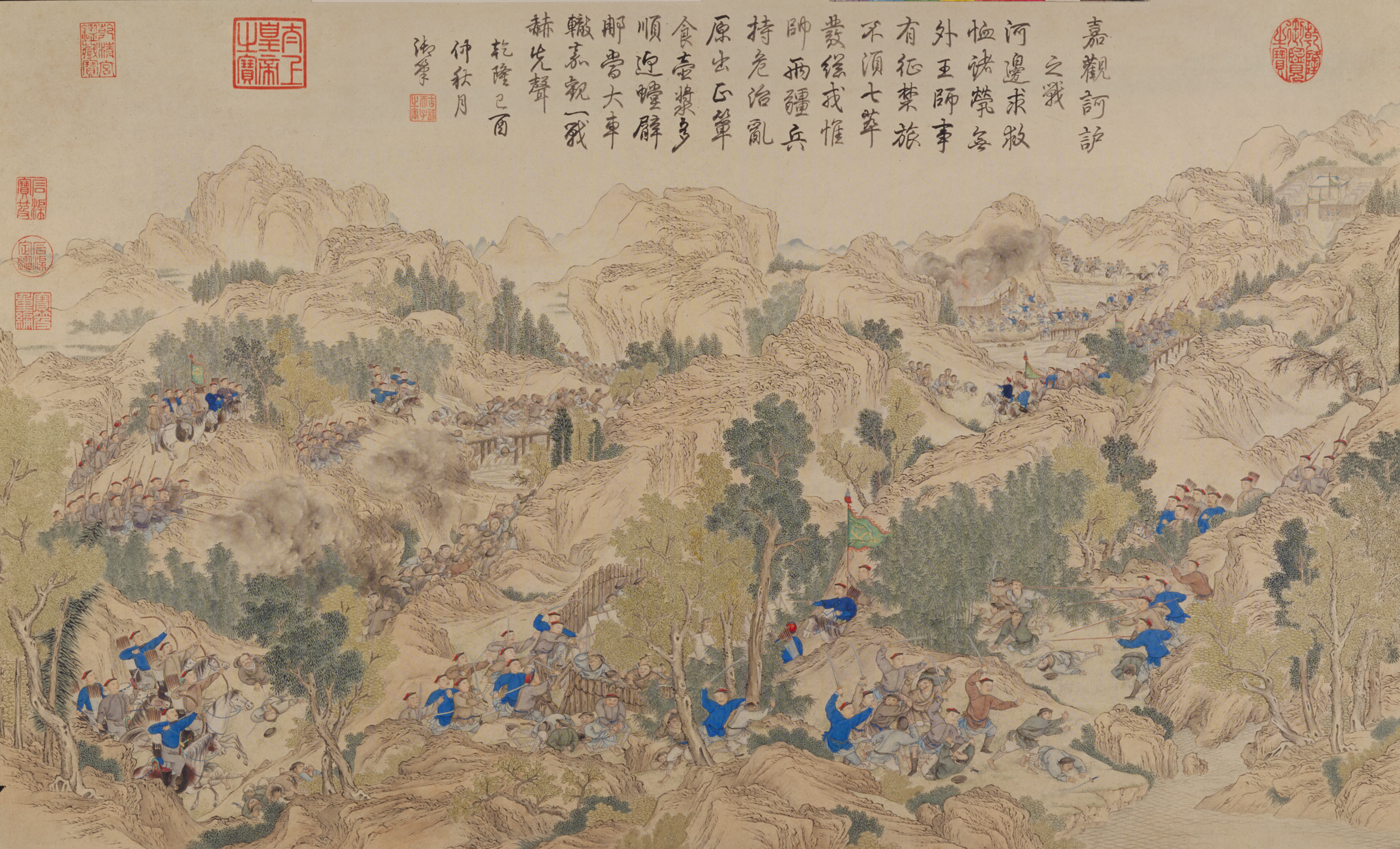
Qing invasion of northern Vietnam in 1788–1789

Vietnam emerged from the disintegration of China's Tang dynasty in the early 900s. The border between China and Vietnam was generally stable for the next 800 years, with China challenging the border once.

China invested the Trần dynasty (1225–1400) as Vietnam's rulers. The Trần's control of Vietnam weakened in the 1390s and in 1400, Hồ Quý Ly deposed the Trần ruler and declared himself the founder of a new dynasty. The Trần requested that China's Ming dynasty intervene on its behalf. The Ming sent troops and envoy to re-establish the Trần and quickly defeated Hồ. The Ming subsequently deemed the Trần to be in disarray and instead reclaimed Vietnam as its own territory. Subsequent Ming emperors returned the relationship to a tributary with a Vietnamese ruler in Vietnam.

According to a 2018 study in the Journal of Conflict Resolution on Vietnam-China relations from 1365 to 1841, they could be characterized as a "hierarchic tributary system" from 1365 to 1841. During Vietnam's Đại Việt period (968–1804), the Vietnamese court explicitly recognized its unequal status compared to China through explicit institutional mechanisms. Vietnam conducted its relations with China through the tributary system. During this period, Vietnam was primarily focused on addressing its domestic instability and its external relations generally focused to the south and west, including with the Champa kingdom, among others.

In 1884, during Vietnam's Nguyễn dynasty, the Qing dynasty and France fought the Sino-French War, which ended in a Chinese defeat. The Treaty of Tientsin recognized French dominance in Vietnam and the protectorate treaty France signed with Vietnam, spelling the end of formal Chinese influence on Vietnam and the beginning of Vietnam's French colonial period.

Both China and Vietnam faced invasion and occupation by Imperial Japan during World War II, and Vietnam languished under the rule of Vichy France. In the Chinese provinces of Guangxi and Guangdong, Vietnamese revolutionaries, led by Phan Bội Châu, had arranged alliances with the Chinese Nationalists, the Kuomintang, before the war by marrying Vietnamese women to Chinese National Revolutionary Army officers. Their children were at an advantage since they could speak both languages and so they worked as agents for the revolutionaries, spreading their ideologies across borders. The intermarriage between Chinese and Vietnamese was viewed with alarm by the French. Chinese merchants also married Vietnamese women and provided funds and help for revolutionary agents.

Late in the war, with Japan and Nazi Germany nearing defeat, US President Franklin Roosevelt privately decided that the French should not return in Indochina after the war was over. Roosevelt offered the Kuomintang leader, Chiang Kai-shek, all of Indochina to be under Chinese rule, but Chiang Kai-shek reportedly replied, "Under no circumstances!" In August 1943, China broke diplomatic relations with Vichy France, with the Central Daily News announcing that diplomatic relations were to be solely between the Chinese and the Vietnamese, with no French intermediary. China had planned to spread massive propaganda on the Atlantic Charter and Roosevelt's statement on Vietnamese self-determination to undermine the French authority in Indochina.

=== World War II and aftermath ===
The Chinese Kuomintang provided support to both the Việt Nam Cách mệnh Đồng minh Hội (Viet Cach) and the Việt Nam Độc lập Đồng minh (Viet Minh) in their struggle against Japanese forces.

After the Second World War ended, a United Nations mandate, had 200,000 Chinese troops, led by General Lu Han, sent by Chiang Kai-shek to Indochina north of the 16th parallel to accept the surrender of Japanese occupying forces. The troops remained in Indochina until June 1946. The Chinese supported the Việt Nam Quốc Dân Đảng and Viet Cach to put pressure on the communist-led Viet Minh. Nevertheless, Chinese occupational forces allowed Ho Chi Minh's Democratic Republic of Vietnam (established in 1945) more influence than their British counterparts in the south. Chiang Kai-shek threatened the French with war to force them to negotiate with Ho Chi Minh. In February 1946, Chiang forced the French colonists to surrender all of their concessions in China and to renounce their extraterritorial privileges in exchange for withdrawing from northern Indochina and for allowing French troops to reoccupy the region.

=== Cold War ===
People's Republic of China – Democratic Republic of Vietnam relations
- China: North Vietnam

Republic of China – Republic of Vietnam relations
- Taiwan: South Vietnam

==== First Indochina War and Vietnam War ====
Along with the Soviet Union, China was an important strategic ally of Vietnamese communists (Democratic Republic of Vietnam) during the First Indochina War and Vietnam War. The Chinese Communist Party provided arms, military training and essential supplies to help the Vietnamese communists against the French Union, the anticommunist Republic of Vietnam, their ally the United States, and other anti-communists between 1950 and 1975. As for the Chinese communists, in the face of the fact that this force was waging a civil war against the Kuomintang's government, the Vietnamese communists supported them with shelter and some necessities. In mid-1949, the Vietnamese communists even sent troops to coordinate with the Chinese communists to expand the control area in the Sino-Vietnamese border area. The efforts of the Vietnamese communists, operating under the cover of the Việt Minh front, were noticed and secretly supported by the Soviet Union and the Chinese communists before 1950. In 1947, the Chinese communists helped the Vietnamese communists buy weapons in Thailand. After Mao Zedong founded the People's Republic of China on October 1, 1949, Ho Chi Minh immediately sent two groups to China simultaneously to ask for help on October 6. In November 1949, at the World Trade Union Congress held in Beijing, Communist China publicly announced its intention when it announced that it would actively support the revolutionary movement in Indochina. During Mao's December 1949 visit to the Soviet Union, Stalin sought Mao's assistance in supporting the Vietnamese Communists against France in the First Indochina War. Mao accepted Stalin's view of a "worldwide communist revolution" and agreed to share "the international responsibility" and support the Vietnamese communists. After Mao's return to China, the country began sending military advisors and military aid to the Vietnamese. In January 1950, China and the Soviet Union recognized the government of the Vietnamese communists and formed the basis of relations changed from party-to-party to state-to-state. In April 1951, communist China raised relations with the Vietnamese communists to the ambassadorial level. Meanwhile, the French-associated State of Vietnam was established in June 1949 and later established diplomatic relations with the Republic of China, commonly known as Taiwan.

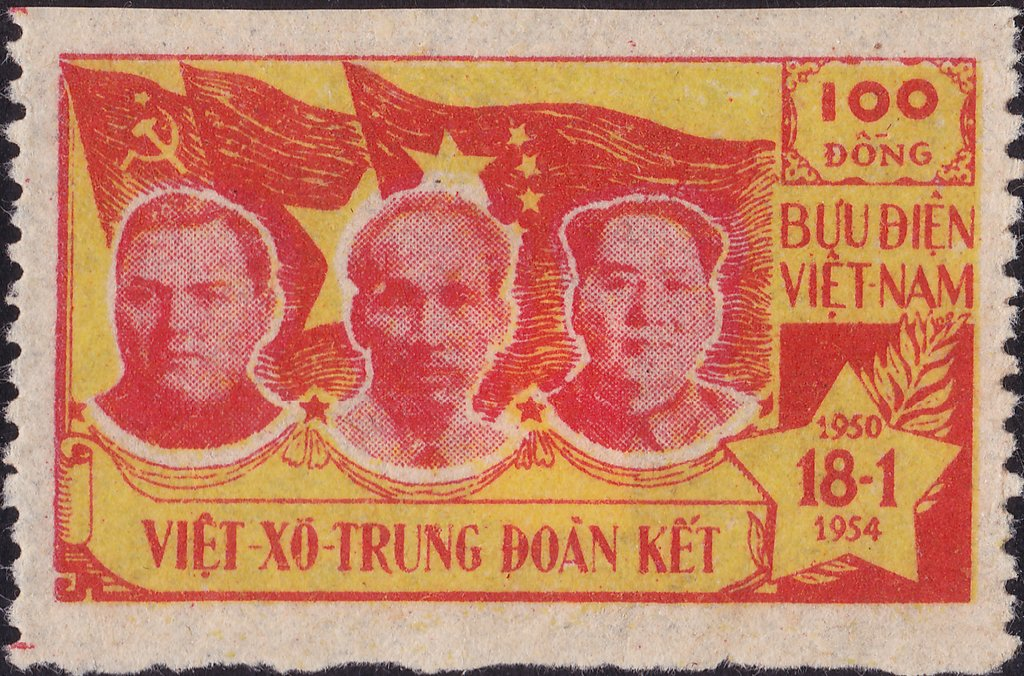
Postage stamp of Ho Chi Minh with Mao Zedong and Georgy Malenkov in 1954.

China provided enormous and important support to the Viet Minh both civilly and militarily during the war against France. However, during the 1954 Geneva Conference ending the First Indochina War, Chinese premier Zhou Enlai urged the Viet Minh delegation to accept partition at the 17th parallel with the communists ruling the North and pro-French government keeping the South, which was regarded as a betrayal.

In 1960, China became the first country to recognize the National Liberation Front (the Viet Cong) in Vietnam. Ho Chi Minh and Mao Zedong frequently characterized the bilateral relationship as "comrade plus brother". In 1963, Liu Shaoqi praised the strength of the relationship, stating, "Our friendship has a long history. It is a militant friendship, forged in the storm of revolution, a great class friendship that is proletarian internationalist in character, a friendship that is indestructible."

During 1964 to 1969, China reportedly sent over 300,000 troops, mostly in anti-aircraft divisions to combat in Vietnam. However, the Vietnamese communists remained suspicious of China's perceived attempts to increase its influence over Vietnam.

From 1960 to 1978, China sent aid $20 billion worth of aid to Vietnam. The aid was not a loan and no repayment was asked. In 1964, North Vietnamese leaders requested Chinese help in combatting malaria, which had become an increasing health problem following the war. Mao supported a major effort (Project 523), which included leveraging grassroots knowledge and folk remedies. These efforts led to the discovery of artemisinin.

In response to U.S. bombing of North Vietnam, China launched the Resist America, Aid Vietnam campaign. The campaign themes denounced U.S. imperialism and promoted Vietnamese resistance. Local communist party cadre organized mass meetings and street demonstrations, and millions of people across the country marched in China to support the campaign between February 9 and February 11, 1965. The communist party also expanded the campaign into cultural media such as film and photography exhibitions, singing contests, and street performances.

During the Vietnam War, the North Vietnamese and the Chinese had agreed to defer tackling their territorial issues until South Vietnam was defeated. Those issues included the lack of delineation of Vietnam's territorial waters in the Gulf of Tonkin and the question of sovereignty over the Paracel and Spratly Islands in the South China Sea. During the 1950s, half of the Paracels were controlled by China and the rest by South Vietnam. In 1958, North Vietnam accepted China's claim to the Paracels and relinquished its own claim; one year earlier, China had ceded White Dragon Tail Island to North Vietnam. The potential of offshore oil deposits in the Gulf of Tonkin heightened tensions between China and South Vietnam.

Vietnam disapproved of China's efforts to improve relations with the United States. Prime Minister Phạm Văn Đồng asked Mao Zedong to cancel the 1972 visit of United States President Richard Nixon to China, but Mao declined.

In 1973, with the Vietnam War drawing to a close, North Vietnam announced its intention to allow foreign companies to explore oil deposits in disputed waters. In January 1974, a clash between Chinese and South Vietnamese forces resulted in China taking complete control of the Paracels, leading to South Vietnam having to strengthen its defense in the Spratly Islands. When South Vietnam nearly fell in 1975, North Vietnam took over the South Vietnamese-controlled portions of the Spratly Islands. The unified Vietnam then canceled its earlier renunciation of its claim to the Paracels, and both China and Vietnam claim control over all the Spratlys and actually control some of the islands.

1970s

By the mid-1970s, the relationship between China and Vietnam was strained. The tensions between the two countries developed in relation to a number of issues, including Vietnam's support of the Soviet side during the Sino-Soviet split, Vietnam's invasion of Cambodia, Vietnam's mistreatment of ethnic Chinese in Vietnam, and border conflicts.

Tensions were heightened in the 1970s by the Vietnamese government's oppression of the Hoa minority (Vietnamese of Chinese ethnicity). In February 1976, Vietnam implemented registration programs in the south. Ethnic Chinese in Vietnam were required to adopt Vietnamese citizenship or leave the country. In early 1977, Vietnam implemented what it described as a purification policy in its border areas to keep Chinese border residents to the Chinese side of the border. Following another discriminatory policy introduced in March 1978, a large number of Chinese fled from Vietnam to southern China. China and Vietnam attempted to negotiate issues related to Vietnam's treatment of ethnic Chinese, but these negotiations failed to resolve the issues.

China's support of Angkar and the Khmer Rouge in Cambodia concerned Vietnamese leadership, which feared encirclement by China. The 1977 Cambodian–Vietnamese War caused tensions with China, which had allied itself with Democratic Kampuchea that was founded by the Maoist leader Pol Pot (Saloth Sâr).

In June 1978, China rescinded the appointment of its consul general to Ho Chi Minh City and informed Vietnam that it must close three of its consulates in China. By the end of July 1978, China ended all of its aid programs to Vietnam and recalled all of its experts from Vietnam.

==== Third Indochina War ====
Vietnam had signed a treaty of friendship with the Soviet Union and established extensive commercial and military ties.

On February 17, 1979, the Chinese People's Liberation Army crossed the Vietnamese border but withdrew on March 5, after a two-week campaign had devastated northern Vietnam and briefly threatened the Vietnamese capital, Hanoi. Both sides suffered relatively heavy losses, with thousands of casualties. Subsequent peace talks broke down in December 1979, and China and Vietnam began a major buildup of forces along the border. Vietnam fortified its border towns and districts and stationed as many as 600,000 troops. China stationed 400,000 troops on its side of the border. Sporadic fighting on the border occurred throughout the 1980s, and China threatened to launch another attack to force Vietnam's exit from Cambodia.

=== 1990–present ===
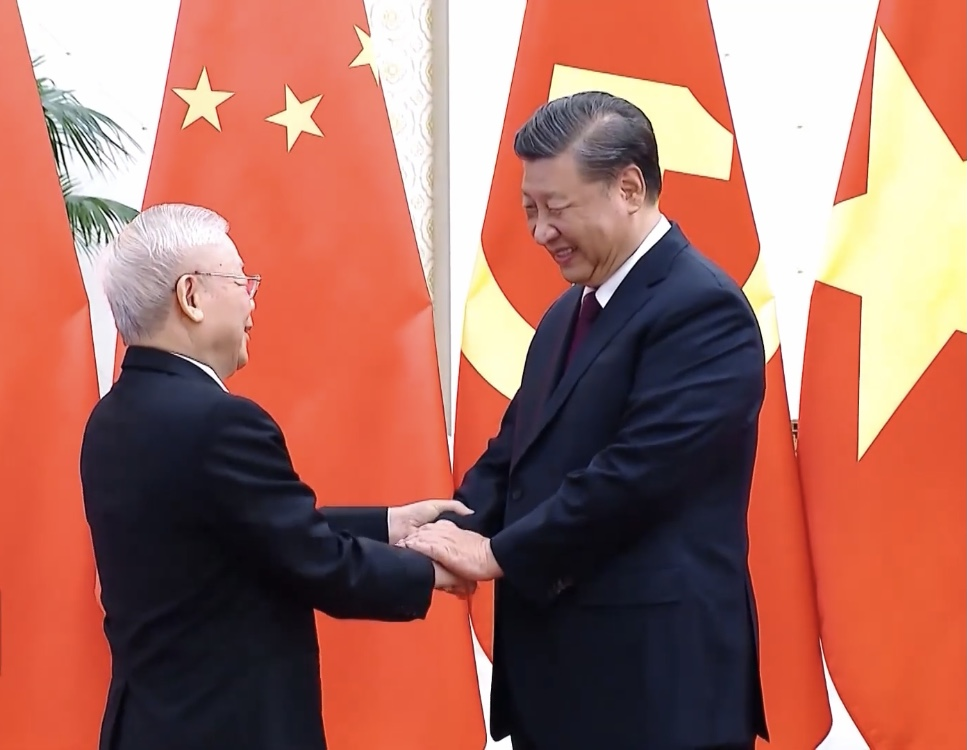
Vietnamese general secretary Nguyễn Phú Trọng with Chinese general secretary Xi Jinping in November 2022

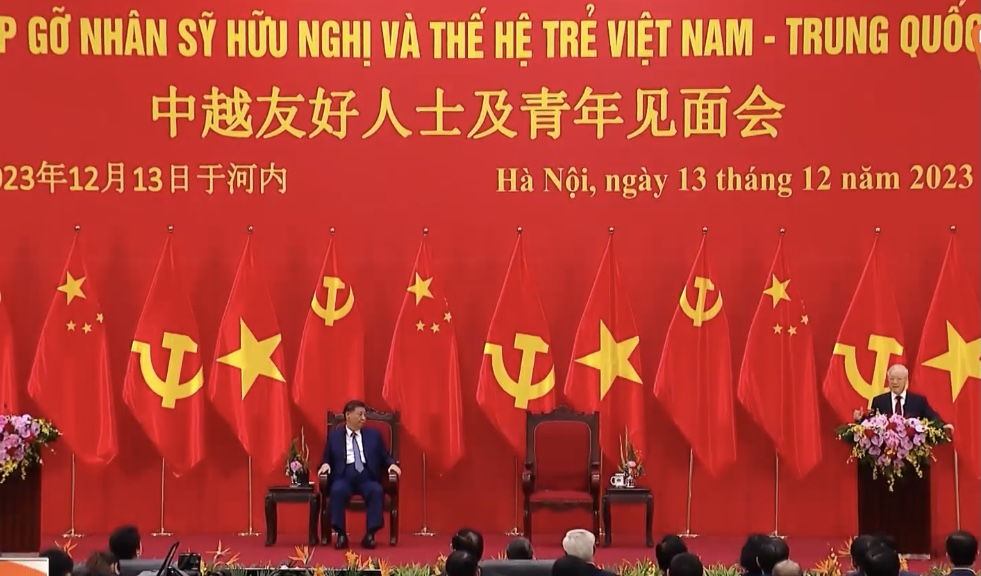
General secretary Nguyễn Phú Trọng and General secretary Xi Jinping in December 2023

With the 1991 dissolution of the Soviet Union and Vietnam's 1990 exit from Cambodia, China–Vietnam ties began to improve. Both nations planned the normalization of their relations in a secret summit in Chengdu in September 1990, and officially normalized ties on 5 November 1991. Since 1991, the leaders and high-ranking officials of both nations have exchanged visits. China and Vietnam both recognized and supported the post-1991 government of Cambodia, and supported each other's bid to join the World Trade Organization (WTO).

In their contemporary diplomatic framework, China and Vietnam regularly reference the Sixteen Word Guideline and the Four Good Guiding Spirits. The Sixteen Word Guideline includes principles such as "Friendly neighbourliness, comprehensive cooperation, long-term stability, and future-oriented thinking". The Four Good Guiding Spirits are "Good neighbours, good friends, good comrades, and good partners".

As part of efforts to develop border trade between the two countries, People's Liberation Army (PLA) soldiers began large scale mine-clearing operations along the border in 1993.

In 1999, the General Secretary of the Communist Party of Vietnam, Lê Khả Phiêu, visited Beijing, where he met General Secretary of the Chinese Communist Party Jiang Zemin and announced a joint 16 Word Guideline for improved bilateral relations; a Joint Statement for Comprehensive Cooperation was issued in 2000. In 2000, Vietnam and China successfully resolved longstanding disputes over their land border and maritime rights in the Gulf of Tonkin, including the cession of land surrounding the Friendship Pass to China. Phiêu delayed the signing of Vietnam's first bilateral trade treaty with the United States because he was concerned about the potential Chinese response.

==== 2000s ====
A joint agreement between China and ASEAN in 2002 marked out a process of peaceful resolution and guarantees against armed conflict. In 2002, Jiang Zemin made an official visit to Vietnam in which numerous agreements were signed to expand trade and co-operation and to resolve outstanding disputes.

China and Vietnam signed a comprehensive strategic partnership in 2008. In 2009, they signed a protocol on science and technology cooperation. In November 2009, the two countries signed a land boundary demarcation agreement on their land borders.

==== 2010s ====
In October 2011, CPV general secretary Nguyễn Phú Trọng made an official visit to China at the invitation of CCP general secretary Hu Jintao with the aim of improving relations in the wake of the border disputes.

On 1 December 2015, Vietnam and China signed an agreement to resolve border marker problems and to enhance cooperation in protecting and managing border markers.

On 12 July 2016, the historical and internationally-binding South China Sea Arbitration, organized under the United Nations Convention on the Law of the Sea (UNCLOS), rejected certain forms of Chinese claims, notably the maritime claims of China, within the so-called nine-dash line, which the court effectively invalidated. The ruling was welcomed by Vietnam. The court did not rule on matters of territorial sovereignty since that is not part of the court's scope. (Note: PCA Award, Section V(F)(d)(264, 266, 267), p. 113.) (Note: PCA Award, Section V(F)(d)(278), p. 117.) As of November 2023, 27 governments had called for the ruling to be respected, including Vietnam, the Philippines, the United States, Japan, South Korea, Indonesia, Malaysia, the United Kingdom, and France. It was rejected by eight governments, including China (PRC), Taiwan (ROC), and North Korea.

==== 2020s ====
In 2020, for the celebration of Vietnam's 75th National Day, CCP general secretary Xi Jinping and CPV general secretary Nguyễn Phú Trọng reaffirmed their bilateral ties while looking back saying: "In the past 70 years, although there have been some ups and downs in bilateral relations, friendship and cooperation had always been the main flow." Nguyễn Phú Trọng visited China in 2022 where he met Xi, becoming the first foreign leader to meet Xi after he secured a third term in the 20th CCP National Congress. Both leaders released a joint statement, calling for cooperation in economic, political, defense and security areas and working together in "the fight against terrorism, 'peaceful evolution', 'colour revolution' and the politicisation of human rights issues".

Vietnamese prime minister Phạm Minh Chính visited China in June 2023 to attend a summit of the World Economic Forum. While in China, he met with Xi, Chinese premier Li Qiang, chairman of the Standing Committee of the National People's Congress Zhao Leji, and chairman of the Chinese People's Political Consultative Conference Wang Huning. Phạm additionally visited Xiong'an New Area, a key project of Xi. In December 2023, Xi visited Vietnam, where both countries upgraded their relationship to a "community with a shared future of humanity", also translated as "community of common destiny for mankind" by Vietnam.

In August 2024, CPV general secretary Tô Lâm visited China, meeting Wang Huning, a member of the CCP Politburo Standing Committee, on August 19, 2024. They discussed the strategic plans established by their leaders to enhance the China–Vietnam relationship and promote their shared future. Both parties reaffirmed their commitment to advancing cooperation between their countries. The meeting also included Hu Chunhua and Wang Dongfeng. While in Beijing, Tô Lâm visited the Chairman Mao Memorial Hall, and visited several former headquarters, bases, and memorials of the Vietnamese communists in Guangzhou. On 13 October 2024, Vietnam and China signed 10 agreements to boost cross-border rail links, payment systems, and economic cooperation, while also enhancing defense and trade relations.

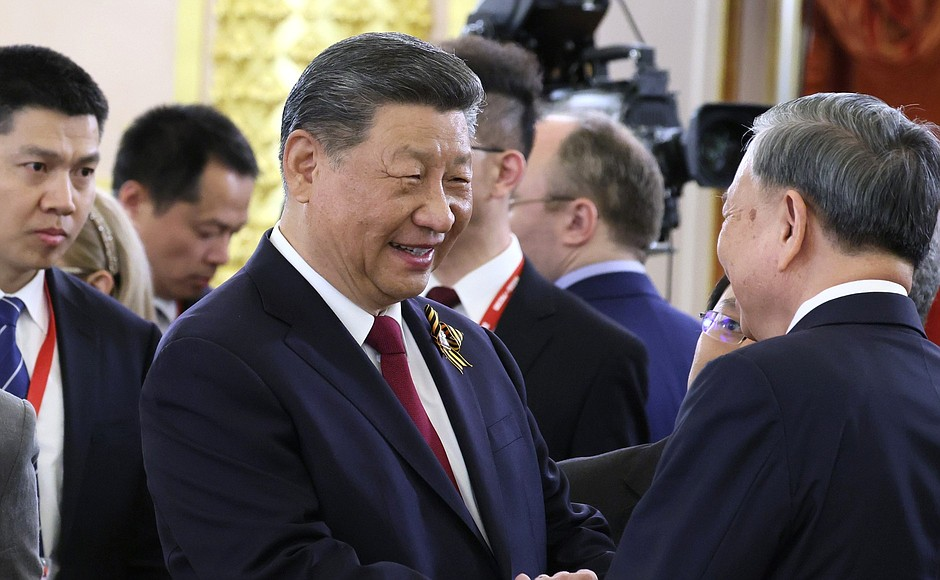
Chinese general secretary Xi Jinping meets Vietnamese general secretary Tô Lâm in Moscow (2025)

In April 2025, CCP General Secretary Xi Jinping visited Vietnam to reaffirm bilateral relations and to urge Vietnam to oppose "unilateral bullying" in response to US President Donald Trump's Liberation Day tariffs. Xi also met with General Secretary Tô Lâm and Vietnamese Prime Minister Phạm Minh Chính. During the visit, the two countries signed 45 agreements aimed at strengthening bilateral relations. These agreements covered a range of sectors, including supply chain integration, artificial intelligence, joint maritime patrols, and railway infrastructure development. On 30 April 2025, the 50th anniversary of the end of the Vietnam War, the PLA for the first time joined armies of Laos and Cambodia as part of Vietnam's military parade for the occasion. Vietnamese state media also disclosed for the first time that over 300,000 Chinese military personnel in North Vietnam provided assistance during the Vietnam War. On 2 September 2025, at the 80th National Day celebrations of Vietnam, the PLA joined the armies of Russia, Laos, and Cambodia in Vietnam's military parade to commemorate the day.

In early 2026, Vietnam protested China's land reclamation and construction at Antelope Reef in the disputed Paracel Islands, where dredging and infrastructure, including plans for an airstrip and maritime facilities, could make it China's largest outpost in the South China Sea. The expansion raised regional security concerns, while China maintained its claim over the islands, reflecting ongoing tensions in the South China Sea with overlapping territorial and maritime claims.

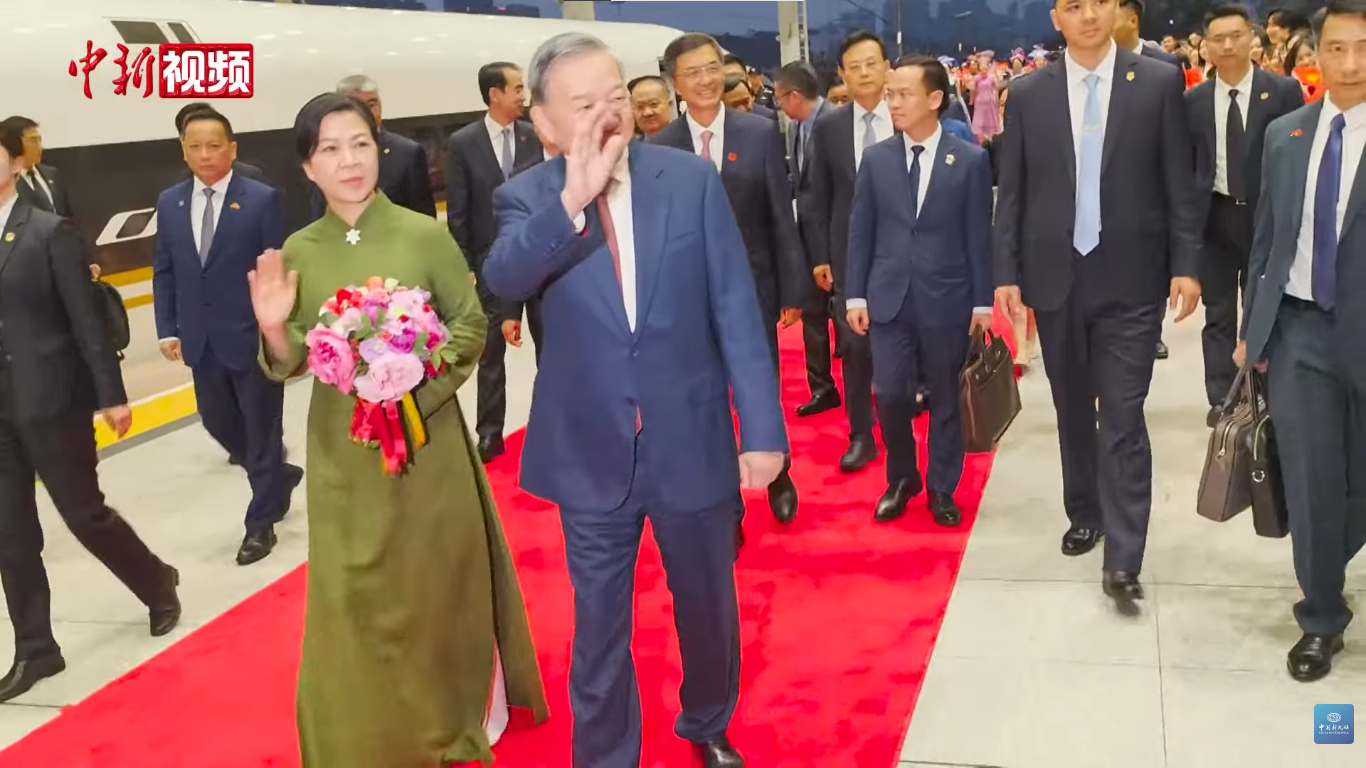
Tô Lâm and Ngô Phương Ly arrived at Nanning, Guangxi in April 2026

In April 2026, Tô Lâm visited China, which is the first overseas trip after he appointed as the Vietnamese president. The analysis said Lâm's visit will strengthen the China–Vietnam relationship. While meeting Lâm, Xi Jinping said that "Safeguarding the socialist system and the ruling status of the Communist Party constitutes the largest shared strategic interest of the two parties of China and Vietnam". In November 2026, Lâm visited Shenzhen to attend APEC China 2026. During the visit, he met with Xi, who told him that China and Vietnam were "comrades and brothers" and "should stand together all the more in turbulent times", while calling for cooperation on maritime issues.

== Economic relations ==
Countries that have signed co-operation agreements related to the Belt and Road Initiative

As of at least 2024, the Vietnamese economy is becoming increasingly connected with China's. Vietnam is China's eighth largest trading partner, and largest among southeast Asian countries. After both sides resumed trade links in 1991, growth in annual bilateral trade increased from only US$32 million in 1991 to almost US$7.2 billion in 2004. By 2011, the trade volume had reached US$25 billion. In 2019, the total value of trade between the two countries amounted to US$224 billion. As of 2024, China accounted for 18.2% of the total exports values of Vietnam and 37.8% of imports of Vietnam.

Vietnam's exports to China include crude oil, coal, coffee, and food, and China exports pharmaceuticals, machinery, petroleum, fertilizers, and automobile parts to Vietnam. Both nations are working to establish an "economic corridor" from China's Yunnan Province to Vietnam's northern provinces and cities and similar economic zones linking China's Guangxi Province with Vietnam's Lạng Sơn and Quang Ninh Provinces, and the cities of Hanoi and Haiphong. Air and sea links and a railway line have been opened between the countries, along with national-level seaports in the frontier provinces and regions of the two countries. Joint ventures have furthermore been launched, such as the Thai Nguyen Steel Complex, but the deal eventually fell through, resulting in the bankruptcy of state-owned Thai Nguyen Iron and Steel VSC and the withdrawal of the China Metallurgical Group Corporation from the project. Vietnam became able to export durian to China in 2022.

Chinese investments in Vietnam have been rising since 2015, reaching US$2.17 billion in 2017.

Vietnam joined the Belt and Road Initiative (BRI) in 2017.

In 2018, protesters went on the streets in Vietnam against government plans to open new special economic zones, including one in Quang Ninh, near the Chinese border, which would allow 99-year land leases, citing concerns about Chinese dominance.

In July 2025, China criticized a trade agreement that Vietnam reached with the United States, which imposed a tariff on the transshipment of non-Vietnamese good via Vietnam.

== Military relations ==
In 2014, China and Vietnam reached an agreement on holding annual border defense friendly exchange activities. In March of the same year, China's Guangxi Zhuang Autonomous Region and Vietnam's Quang Ninh Province held the first Sino-Vietnamese border defense friendly exchange activity, which was co-chaired by the defense ministers of the two countries. Since then, the two sides have taken turns to hold this activity every year. As of July 2025, it has been held nine times. In July 2025, the Ministry of National Defense of China announced that it would hold the "Walking Hand in Hand-2025" joint army training with Vietnam in Guangxi in mid-to-late July. This activity will be the first joint army training between China and Vietnam. China stated that this joint training will be based on the theme of "joint duty training in border areas" to strengthen mutual learning and mutual reference of border duty experience and further deepen practical cooperation between the two militaries.

== Territory issues ==
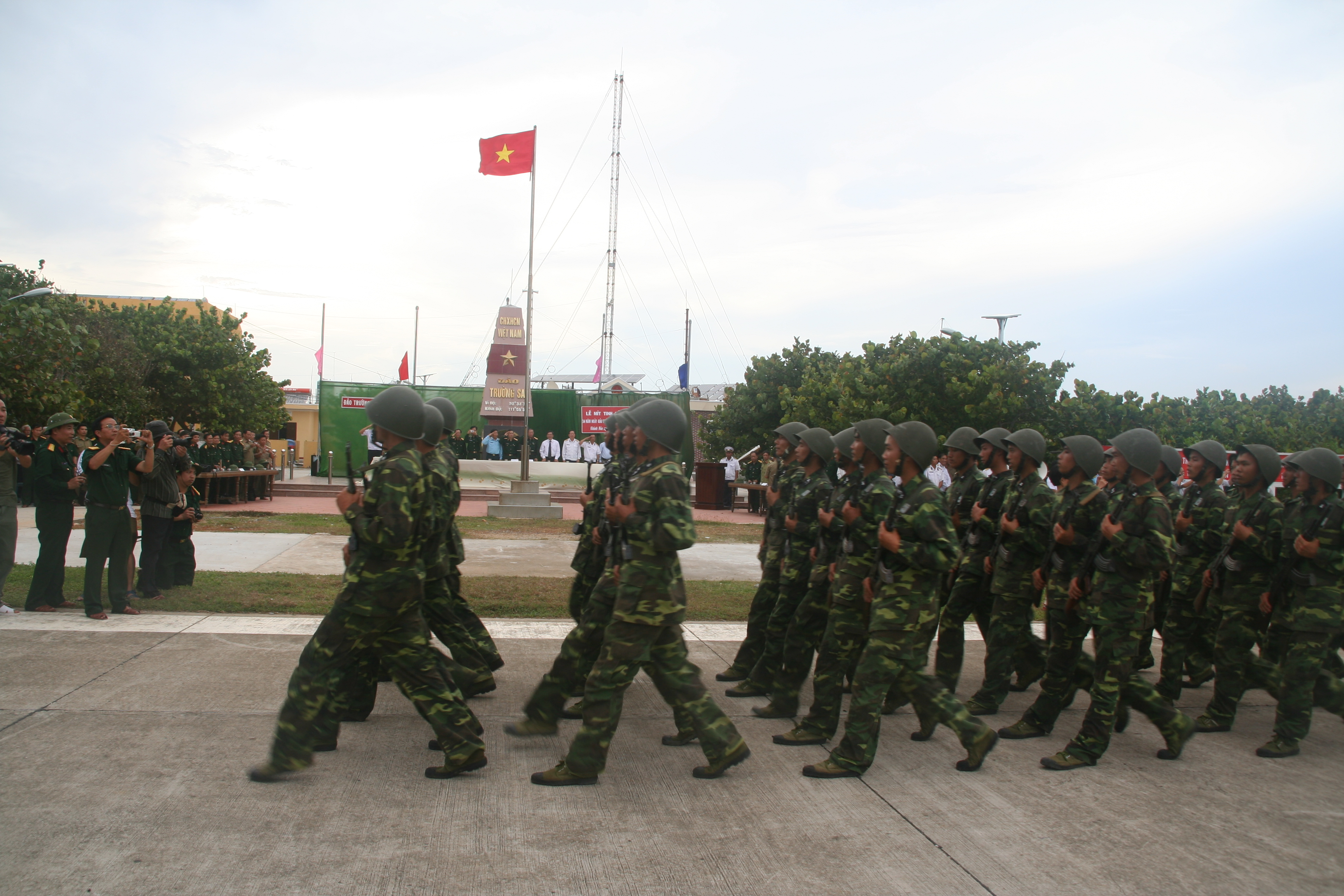
Vietnamese troops on Spratly Island in 2009.

Territorial claims in the South China Sea

The land border of China and Vietnam is 1,347 kilometers. Two Chinese provinces adjoin the border, and seven Vietnamese provinces do.

Border disputes between the two countries were significant in the 1970s. One hundred sixty-four locations on the land border totaling 227 square kilometers were disputed. Because there was not yet clear border demarcation, the countries engaged in a pattern of retaliatory land grabs and violence. The number of border skirmishes increased yearly from 125 in 1974 to 2,175 in 1978.

The two countries attempted a first round of negotiations to resolve land border issues, but were not successful. A second round of negotiations in August 1978 was also unsuccessful because of the Youyi Pass Incident in which the Vietnamese army and police expelled 2,500 refugees across the border into China. Vietnamese authorities beat and stabbed refugees during the incident, as well as 9 Chinese civilian border workers. Following this event, Vietnam occupied the Pu Nian Ling area, which China also claimed.

In June 2011, Vietnam announced that its military would conduct new exercises in the South China Sea. China had previously voiced its disagreement over Vietnamese oil exploration in the area, stating that the Spratly Islands and the surrounding waters were its sovereign territory. Defense of the South China Sea was cited as one of the possible missions of the first Chinese PLA Navy aircraft carrier, the Liaoning, which entered service in September 2012.

On 21 June 2012, Vietnam passed a law entitled the "Law on the Sea", which placed both the Spratly Islands and the Paracel Islands under Vietnamese jurisdiction, prompting China to label the move as "illegal and invalid." A month afterwards, China enacted a previously delayed plan established prefecture of Sansha City, which encompassed the Xisha (Paracel), Zhongsha, and Nansha (Spratly) Islands and the surrounding waters. Vietnam proceeded to a strong opposition to the measure and the reaffirmation of its sovereignty over the islands. Other countries surrounding the South China Sea have claims to the two island chains, including Taiwan, Brunei, Malaysia, and the Philippines.

=== 2013–2015 fishing and oil standoffs ===
In May 2013 Vietnam accused China of hitting one of its fishing boats.

On 7 June 2013, the two countries established a naval hotline. On 21 June 2013, Vietnam and China established a hot line to deal with fisheries incidents.

In May 2014, Vietnam accused China of ramming and sinking a fishing boat. In recent years, Beijing oversaw the replacement of traditional Chinese wooden fishing vessels with steel-hulled trawlers, fitted with modern communication and high-tech navigation systems. The better-equipped boats sailed into the disputed waters as a state-subsidized operation to extend Chinese sovereignty, while in Vietnam, private citizens, not the government, would donate to Vietnamese fishermen to maintain their position in the South China Sea and to defend national sovereignty. That dynamic continues to be a major source of tension between the two countries.

In May 2014, both countries sparred over an oil rig in disputed territory in the South China Sea, which triggered deadly anti-Chinese protests in Vietnam. Rioters attacked hundreds of foreign-owned factories in an industrial park in southern Vietnam, targeting Chinese ones. Following the damage, the Vietnamese government pursued a more moderate foreign policy approach with China and sought to improve the bilateral relations.

In June China declared there would be no military conflict with Vietnam. China then had 71 ships in the disputed area, and Vietnam had 61.

However, on 2 June 2014, it was reported by VGP News, the online newspaper of the Vietnamese Government that the previous day, Chinese ships had in three waves attacked two Vietnam Coast Guard ships, a Vietnamese fisheries surveillance ship and a number of other ships by physically ramming the ships and with water cannons.

In 2017, Beijing warned Hanoi that it would attack Vietnamese bases in the Spratly Islands if gas drilling continued in the area. Hanoi then ordered Spain's Repsol, whose subsidiary was conducting the drilling, to stop drilling.

=== 2019–present ===
Through 2019 and 2020, Chinese ships have continued attacking and sinking of Vietnamese fishing and other vessels in different incidents. Vietnam only reacted to these incidents by official statements and diplomatic protests. In late 2020, Chinese Defense Minister Wei Fenghe met with Vietnamese ambassador to China Phạm Sao Mai in an attempt to cool down tensions after an increased number of incidents. The Vietnamese strategy on the South Chinese Sea disputes has been described as a long term consistent act of "balancing, international integration and 'cooperation and struggle'."

In 2020, Bloomberg News reported that a hacker group known as APT32 or OceanLotus, allegedly affiliated with the Vietnamese government, targeted China's Ministry of Emergency Management and the Wuhan municipal government in order to obtain information about the COVID-19 pandemic. The Vietnamese Ministry of Foreign Affairs called the accusations unfounded. In May 2020, an Israeli cybersecurity company reported to have discovered ransomware attacks targeting government systems in Vietnam and several other countries by China-linked groups.

Illegal border crossings by Chinese nationals was linked by the Vietnamese public as the perceived cause of new COVID-19 infections in Vietnam, although there had been no evidence for this.

In August 2021 shortly before an expected visit by US Vice President Kamala Harris, Vietnamese Prime Minister Pham Minh Chinh reassured Xiong Bo, the Chinese envoy to Hanoi that Vietnam will not enter an alliance to counter China. Pham suggested the two nations should join with ASEAN to expedite "the slow-moving negotiations" and achieve a code of conduct in the disputed South China Sea region and that his country wanted to build political trust, cooperation and promote exchange with China. Xiong stated in the meeting that the two communist nations shared the same political system and beliefs and that China was willing to work with Vietnam and stick to the two countries' high-level strategic directive to further develop ties. Xiong also requested for Vietnam's support in opposing what China claims as "politicisation" of COVID-19 origin investigations.

In March 2023, Chinese and Vietnamese vessels had chased each other in South China Sea in an incident where Chinese ship intruded into Vietnam's Special Economic Zone.

On December 12, 2023, the two countries announced 36 cooperation agreements during a visit by CCP General Secretary Xi Jinping to Vietnam. The agreements addressed a variety of issues, including cross-border rail development, digital infrastructure, and establishing joint patrols in the Gulf of Tonkin and a hotline to handle South China Sea fishing incidents. China and Vietnam also issued a joint statement to support building a community of shared future for humankind. In September 2024, Vietnamese media reported that Chinese personnel boarded a Vietnamese fishing vessel near the Parcel Islands and beat its crew with iron bars. Vietnam and the Philippines condemned the attack while China disputed Vietnam's version of the incident.

In 2024, Chinese maritime forces reportedly clashed with Vietnamese fishing vessels near the Paracel and Spratly Islands, causing injuries and vessel damage. The incidents highlighted ongoing territorial disputes, the repression of local fishers, and limited protection from authorities, reflecting broader regional tensions.

== Cyberwarfare ==
In 2012, Chinese state-sponsored hackers attacked PetroVietnam, Vietnam News Agency, and Vietnam Post. During the Hai Yang Shi You 981 standoff in 2014, multiple Vietnamese government websites were attacked by Chinese hackers. In 2016, following the South China Sea Arbitration ruling, multiple Vietnamese airports were hacked. In 2020, Vietnamese government officials were targeted in phishing campaigns by the China-based state-sponsored hacking group Pirate Panda. In 2023, Vietnam publicly named several Chinese advanced persistent threat groups targeting it.

== Public opinions ==
In 2014, a survey conducted by the Pew Research Center showed 84% of Vietnamese were concerned that disputes relating to the South China Sea could lead to military conflict. During the 2010s, due to factors including territorial disputes, Vietnamese public was largely negative to China, coinciding with pro-American sentiments. Since the 2020s, Vietnamese public opinion was noted to have moved to become more favorable towards China. According to a 2026 feeling thermometer poll by the Carter Center and Emory University, Chinese opinion of Vietnam was on average 30 out of 100.

== Resident diplomatic missions ==
of China in Vietnam

- Hanoi (Embassy)
- Da Nang (Consulate-General)
- Ho Chi Minh City (Consulate-General)

of Vietnam in China

- Beijing (Embassy)
- Chongqing (Consulate-General)
- Guangzhou (Consulate-General)
- Hong Kong (Consulate-General)
- Kunming (Consulate-General)
- Nanning (Consulate-General)
- Shanghai (Consulate-General)

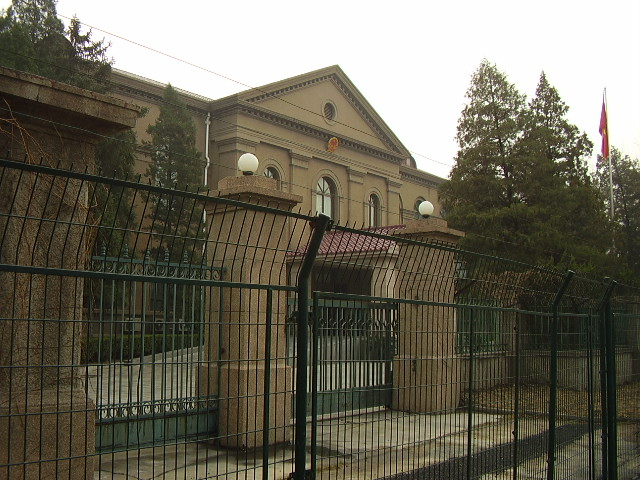
Embassy of Vietnam in Beijing

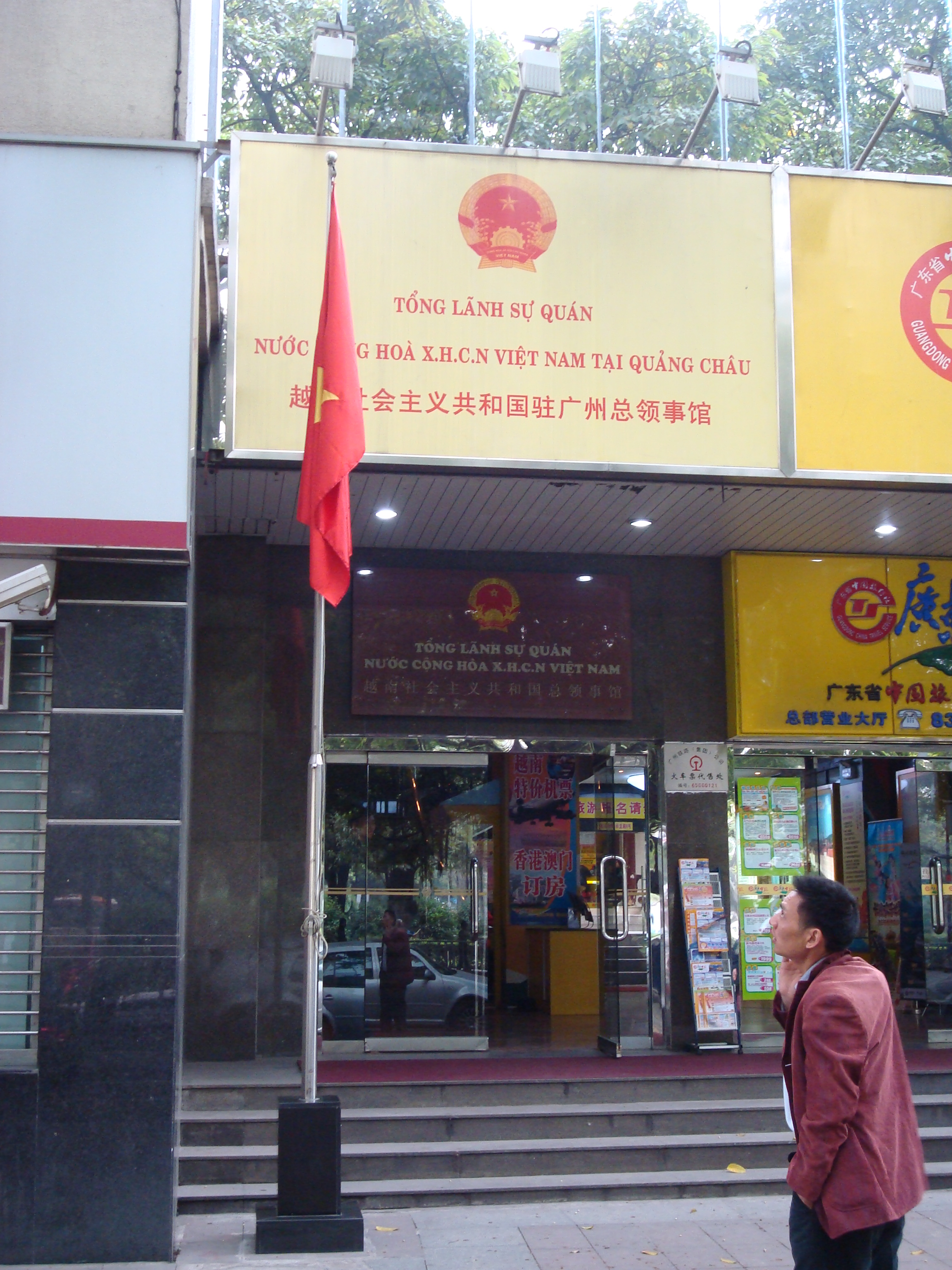
Consulate-General of Vietnam in Guangzhou

== See also ==
- Foreign relations of China
- Foreign relations of Vietnam
- Ambassadors of China to Vietnam
- Ambassadors of Vietnnam to China
- Chinese people in Vietnam
- Vietnamese people in China

== Bibliography ==
- Amer, Ramses. "China, Vietnam, and the South China Sea: disputes and dispute management." Ocean Development & International Law 45.1 (2014): 17–40.
- Ang, Cheng Guan. Southeast Asia's cold war: An interpretive history (U of Hawaii Press, 2018) online review.
- Ang, Cheng Guan. Vietnamese Communist Relations with China and the Second Indo-China Conflict, 1956-1962 (MacFarland, 1997).
- Ang, Cheng Guan. Southeast Asia after the Cold War: A Contemporary History (Singapore: NUS Press, 2019).
- Blazevic, Jason J. "Navigating the security dilemma: China, Vietnam, and the South China Sea." Journal of Current Southeast Asian Affairs 31.4 (2012): 79–108. online
- Brook, Timothy, Michael van Walt van Praag, and Miek Boltjes, eds. Sacred mandates: Asian international relations since Chinggis Khan (University of Chicago Press, 2018).
- Chakraborti, Tridib. "China and Vietnam in the South China Sea Dispute: A Creeping ‘Conflict–Peace–Trepidation’Syndrome." China Report 48.3 (2012): 283–301. online
- Chen, King C. Vietnam and China, 1938-1954 (Princeton University Press, 2015). excerpt
- Cuong, Nguyen Xuan, and Nguyen Thi Phuong Hoa. "Achievements and Problems in Vietnam: China Relations from 1991 to the Present." China Report 54.3 (2018): 306–324. online
- Fravel, M. Taylor. Active Defense: China's Military Strategy Since 1949 (Princeton UP, 2019).
- Garver, John W. China's quest: the history of the foreign relations of the people's Republic of China (Oxford University Press, 2015).
- Ha, Lam Thanh, and Nguyen Duc Phuc. "The US-China Trade War: Impact on Vietnam." (2019). online
- Han, Xiaorong. "Exiled to the ancestral land: The resettlement, stratification and assimilation of the refugees from Vietnam in China." International Journal of Asian Studies 10.1 (2013): 25–46.
- Kang, David C., et al. "War, rebellion, and intervention under hierarchy: Vietnam–China relations, 1365 to 1841." Journal of Conflict Resolution 63.4 (2019): 896–922. online
- Khoo, Nicholas. "Revisiting the Termination of the Sino–Vietnamese Alliance, 1975–1979." European Journal of East Asian Studies 9.2 (2010): 321–361. online
- Kiernan, Ben (2019). Việt Nam: a history from earliest time to the present. Oxford University Press. ISBN 978-0190053796.
- Kurlantzick, Joshua. China-Vietnam Military Clash (Washington: Council on Foreign Relations, 2015). online
- Le Hong Hiep (December 2013). "Vietnam's Hedging Strategy against China since Normalization". Contemporary Southeast Asia. 35 (3): 333–368. doi:10.1355/cs35-3b. S2CID 153762989.
- Liegl, Markus B. China's use of military force in foreign affairs: The dragon strikes (Taylor & Francis, 2017). excerpt
- Nguyen, Anh Ngoc. "Three Structures of Vietnam-China Relations: a View from the Structural Constructivist Theory." East Asia 38.2 (2021): 123–138. online
- Nguyen, Hanh Thi My. "Application of Center-Periphery Theory to the Study of Vietnam-China Relations in the Middle Ages." Southeast Asian Studies 8.1 (2019): 53–79. online
- Path, Kosal. "China's Economic Sanctions against Vietnam, 1975-1978." China Quarterly (2012) Vol. 212, pp 1040–1058.
- Path, Kosal. "The economic factor in the Sino-Vietnamese split, 1972–75: an analysis of Vietnamese archival sources." Cold War History 11.4 (2011): 519–555.
- Path, Kosal. "The Sino-Vietnamese Dispute over Territorial Claims, 1974–1978: Vietnamese Nationalism and its Consequences." International Journal of Asian Studies 8.2 (2011): 189–220. online
- Taylor, K. W. A History of the Vietnamese (Cambridge University Press, 2013). ISBN 0521875862.
- Wills Jr., John E. “Functional, Not Fossilized: Qing Tribute Relations with Đại Việt (Vietnam) and Siam (Thailand), 1700–1820,” T'oung Pao, Vol. 98 Issue 4–5, (2012), 439–47
- Zhang, Xiaoming. Deng Xiaoping's Long War: The Military Conflict Between China and Vietnam, 1979-1991 (U of North Carolina Press 2015) excerpt
- Zhang, Xiaoming. "Deng Xiaoping and China's Decision to go to War with Vietnam." Journal of Cold War Studies 12.3 (2010): 3-29 online
- Zhang, Xiaoming. "China's 1979 war with Vietnam: a reassessment." China Quarterly (2005): 851–874. online
