= Hồ Văn Hải =

Vietnamese doctor and blogger (b. 1964)

Ho Van Hai
- Born: 1964 (age 61–62)
- Occupations: Doctor and Blogger
- Known for: Citizen journalism

Hồ Văn Hải (born in 1964) is a Vietnamese doctor and blogger. He was arrested and charged with "anti-state propaganda” under Article 88 of the Vietnamese Penal Code. After a one-day trial in Ho Chi Minh City, Hải was sentenced to four years in prison followed by two years' house arrest.

== Background and activism ==
Previously, Hồ Văn Hải worked as a doctor at Cho Ray Hospital. He ran a private practice that he founded in 2004 up until his detention twelve years later. Additionally, Hải has served as the president of a non-profit that he established called the Go West Foundation.

Hải had criticized his nation's one-party regime by the name of “Doctor Ho Hải,” on the internet. His Facebook page and blog posts spanned topics such as education and the environment, notably covering a toxic spill that poisoned millions of fish which was caused by a Taiwanese-owned steel plant.

== 2016 arrest and sentence ==
In November 2016, Hồ Văn Hải was arrested in Ho Chi Minh City and accused of “spreading information and documents on the internet that are against the government of the Social Republic of Vietnam,”.

After a one-day trial in Ho Chi Minh City on February 1, 2018, Hải was sentenced to four years in prison followed by two years house arrest. He was charged with "anti-state propaganda” under Article 88 of the Vietnamese Penal Code.

According to activist Duong Lam, Hải's trial was held in secret and his friends and family were not informed of the proceedings.

His detention is part of a series of arrests of several activists and bloggers, including Nguyễn Văn Hoá and Le Dinh Luong, who also wrote about the environmental disaster at the Formosa steel plant.

Hồ Văn Hải was detained in Chi Hoa prison in Ho Chi Minh City in harsh conditions. Reportedly, his existing health issues were exacerbated and he did not receive sufficient food or correct medications.

Hải was released on April 17, 2020. Although he was scheduled to remain under house arrest until November 2022, he was released and returned to the U.S. in May 2021.

== International rsesponse ==
After his arrest, the UN Human Rights Office for Southeast Asia called on Vietnam to unconditionally release Hải.

In December 2017, the European Parliament adopted an urgent resolution which called on Vietnam to end its persecution of citizen-journalists and to free all of the bloggers that had been imprisoned.

In March 2019, human rights focused non-profit Freedom Now submitted a report detailing the case to the Office of the United Nations Human Rights Committee. This report was delivered in advance of Vietnam's Universal Periodic Review conducted by the UN in January 2019.

In October 2019, Freedom Now and international law firm Dechert LLP submitted a petition to the UN Working Group on Arbitrary Detention on behalf of Hồ Văn Hải. In February 2021, the Working Group determined that his detention is arbitrary and violates international law.

== See also ==
- 2016 Vietnam marine life disaster
- Human rights in Vietnam
- Nguyễn Văn Hoá
- Lê Đình Lượng
