= Trần Văn Bang =

Vietnamese activist, blogger and former soldier

Trần Văn Bang (born 1 March 1961), also known as Trần Bang, is a Vietnamese pro-democracy activist, blogger, and former soldier. After being arrested in March 2022 for promoting "anti-state propaganda" he was sentenced to eight years in prison by the People's Court of Ho Chi Minh City in May 2023.

== Personal life ==
During the late 1970s Bang enlisted in the People's Army of Vietnam, serving during the Sino-Vietnamese War in 1979. After retiring in the mid-1980s, he trained as an irrigation engineer. He became a member of the Lê Hiếu Đằng Club, an intellectual group who often speaks out publicly on national issues.

As of 2022 Bang lives in Bình Thạnh district, Ho Chi Minh City, with his wife.

== Activism ==
A pro-democracy activist, Bang became well known for his posts on the social media website Facebook. He is critical of the Chinese government, particularly regarding its claims over territories in the South China Sea, and the strengthening of ties between China and Vietnam. He has also campaign in support of environmental and human rights. He took part in the 2018 Vietnam protests, where he was assaulted by security forces.

Bang has spoken out publicly in support of political prisoners, including Phạm Đoan Trang, Cấn Thị Thêu, Lê Đình Lượng, Phạm Chí Dũng, and Nguyễn Văn Hoá. In December 2020, Bang went on a one-day hunger strike in support of Trần Huỳnh Duy Thức, a prominent blogger and pro-democracy campaigner who had been sentenced to 16 years in prison. Bang has also arranged fundraisers to support activists such as Đinh Văn Hải and Vũ Tiến Chi, who were assaulted by security forces in June 2018 after visiting Đỗ Thị Minh Hạnh, a political prisoner.

For his campaign work in 2019 Bang was one of ten finalists for Cống hiến award, in recognition for his contribution to the democracy movement in Vietnam.

=== March 2022 arrest ===
Prior to his arrest, Bang reported being frequently placed under house arrest to prevent him from attending rallies and protests. His public campaigning declined in 2021 and 2022 after he experienced poor health, including a tumour in his stomach. In a February 2022 interview with Radio Free Asia, Bang predicted his arrest was imminent, stating that he had been experiencing frequent interrogations from the police on the pretence of talking to him about "propaganda against the Socialist Republic of Vietnam".

On 1 March 2022 Bang was arrested under article 117 of the penal code for "making, storing, and disseminating propaganda", as well as "adversely impacting the political security and social order and safety in Ho Chi Minh City". Books and documents were seized from his home which were reported by state-owned media as containing "propaganda, distortion, and anti-state themes". Tuổi Trẻ, a newspaper and official mouthpiece for the Ho Chi Minh Communist Youth Union, accused Bang of "distorting, defaming, and speaking badly of the people's government... providing false information... causing confusion among the people... and expressing hate and discontent towards the authorities, party, state, and country's leaders".

Following his arrest Bang was held at Chí Hòa Prison in Ho Chi Minh City. His lawyer reported that he was unable to meet with Bang until February 2023, almost a year into his detainment; and that his family were prohibited from visiting him until November 2022. During his detention, Bang's family reported he had lost weight due to untreated health conditions, bad food, and poor prison conditions.

=== May 2023 trial ===
On 12 May 2023 Bang's trial began at the People's Court of Ho Chi Minh City. Evidence used against him included 31 Facebook posts between March 2016 and August 2021 which were critical of the Vietnamese government, including some calling for a boycott of the 2021 elections. Bang's defence stated that he had no control over his Facebook account after it was hacked and that he hadn't used it in some time.

Following a three-hour trial during which diplomats from France and the United States were prohibited from attending, Bang was sentenced to eight years in prison, to be followed by three years of probation. His lawyer stated his intention to appeal the verdict, calling the sentencing as contrary to article 25 of the Vietnamese constitution, which guaranteed freedom of speech.

=== International response ===
Human Rights Watch called for Bang's immediate release, citing his arrest as being evidence of the Vietnamese government using article 117 of the penal code to silence dissent online from pro-democracy activists.

=== Award received ===
Vietnam Human Rights Award 2023
