= Trương Văn Dũng =

Vietnamese human rights activist (born 1954)

Trương Văn Dũng (born 1954) is a Vietnamese human rights activist. After first gaining recognition in the 2000s as a land rights activist after his home was confiscated by the Vietnamese government, he went on to become known as an advocate for freedom of expression, association, and assembly, as well as for his vocal support of prisoners of conscience. In 2023, Dũng was sentenced to six years in prison for "conducting propaganda against the state" on charges that were criticised by Human Rights Watch.

== Personal life ==
Dũng worked as a motorcycle driver and lived in the Đống Đa district of Hanoi with his wife Nghiêm Thị Hợp, a hairdresser.

== Activism ==
Dũng first gained public recognition during the 2000s as a land rights activist, after he led a campaign against the forced confiscation of his home by local authorities. By the 2010s, he had become a vocal advocate for the freedom of expression, association, and assembly in Vietnam. Dũng also took part in multiple public protests in Hanoi, including those against China's occupation of the Paracel Islands, and the pollution of parts of the Vietnamese coast by the Taiwanese company Formosa in 2018. In 2018, he took part in protests against the proposed government cybersecurity law, and boycotted subsequent elections.

Dũng was a public supporter of a number of jailed human rights activists, including Phạm Đoan Trang, Cấn Thị Thêu, Lê Đình Lượng and Phạm Chí Dũng. In 2013, he co-founded Hội Bầu bí Tương Thân (lit. 'Mutual Aid Gourd Association'), a humanitarian group that provided financial and spiritual support for political prisoners and their families.

== Arrests, trial and imprisonment ==
Dũng was attacked on several occasions by government authorities. In October 2013, after visiting a police station to request that possessions taken from land appropriation victims be returned to them, he was physically assaulted, leading to him having three broken ribs. In March 2014, Dũng was attacked and injured by men in civilian clothing. On 21 December 2015, he was attacked with acid by an unknown assailant. On 17 July 2017, Dũng was attacked by plainclothes police officers after attending an anti-China protest.

On 14 March 2018, Dũng visited a police station in Hanoi where a fellow activist, Phạm Đoan Trang, was being held after she and Dũng had participated in a memorial earlier in the day for victims of the Johnson South Reef skirmish. Dũng was interrogated for several hours by police officers, and subsequently left outside his home severely injured.

On 27 October 2019, Dũng was among a group of human rights activists featured on a series of defamatory programmes on An ninh TV, a state-owned television channel. In September 2021, the police newspaper Công an Nhân dân wrote an article about Dũng in which he was described as an activist who "regularly disseminates and shares news/articles and images with content that distorts the political, economic and social situation in the country".

In May 2022, Dũng was arrested in Hanoi on charges of "conducting propaganda against the state" while exercising in public. His whereabouts were unknown for nine months, during which his family had no contact with him; Dũng was not able to speak to a lawyer until March 2023. His wife Hợp stated that Dũng had been physically abused during his detainment, and raised concerns that his health needs were not being met. Prior to his trial, Human Rights Watch called on the Vietnamese government to drop all charges against Dũng, describing him as "the latest in a long line of human rights defenders silenced by the Vietnamese government for protesting against human rights violations".

In March 2023, the Hanoi People's Procuracy released Dũng's indictment, which accused him of giving interviews to foreign media, including the United States-based Saigon Dallas Radio, between 2015 and 2022, and storing illegally printed books, under article 88 of Vietnam's penal code. Dũng's interviews were accused of "distorting and smearing" the Vietnamese government, while it was also reported that he owned illegal books, including Popular Politics by Phạm Đoan Trang, in addition to 31 banners critical of the Vietnamese state.

Dũng's trial occurred on 28 March 2023 at the People's Court of Hanoi, and lasted half a day. Dũng's defence claimed that it was not his voice heard in interviews with Saigon Dallas Radio. At the culmination of the trial, Dũng was sentenced to six years in prison for "conducting propaganda against the state". He is serving his sentence in Gia Trung prison in Gia Lai province.

In July 2023, Dũng's appeal against his sentence was rejected. In June 2024, his wife Hợp reported that Dũng had been kept in shackles for "violating prison regulations" after allegedly insulting another prisoner. He was also banned from having visits and buying supplies. Hợp also reported that Dũng had been kept in solitary confinement for a month between January and February 2024 after arguing with prison officers.

Prior to his trial, Human Rights Watch called on the government to drop all charges against Dũng, calling him "the latest in a long line of human rights defenders silenced by the Vietnamese government for protesting against human rights violations". He is being held in Gia Trung prison in Gia Lai province. In July 2023, his appeal was rejected. In June 2024, his wife Nghiêm Thị Hợp reported that Dũng had been kept in shackles after allegedly "violating prison regulations" after insulting another prisoner. He was also prohibited from visits and buying supplies. She also reported he had been kept in solitary confinement for a month between January and February 2024 after arguing with prison officers.
