= Trần Thị Xuân =

Vietnamese human rights activist (born 1974)

Trần Thị Xuân (born 10 October 1976) is a Vietnamese environmental activist who was sentenced to nine years in prison due to her affiliation with Brotherhood for Democracy, a pro-democracy group in Vietnam.

== Personal life ==
Xuân was born into a Catholic family in Thạch Kim commune, Lộc Hà district, Hà Tĩnh province, the youngest of eight children. She grew up in poverty and did not graduate high school, and worked for a time as a cleaner in Ho Chi Minh City before returning to Hà Tĩnh to care for her siblings' children. She took part in local humanitarian activities through the Catholic church, including collecting waste to be recycled, donating money to the poor and elderly, and providing assistance to victims of natural disasters.

== Activism ==
Xuân first became known as an activist in 2016 when she became a vocal supporter for the rights of fisherman who had lost their livelihoods following the 2016 Vietnam marine life disaster in which Formosa Ha Tinh Steel, a local steel plant, illegally discharged toxic waste into the ocean. This caused an ecological disaster across Vietnam's central coast, including in her home province of Hà Tĩnh. She participated in protests against the plant's owner Formosa Plastics in Lộc Hà, and publicly called for compensation for victims.

In May 2016, Xuân joined Brotherhood for Democracy, a pro-democracy group founded in April 2013 by Nguyễn Văn Đài and other human rights activists. The Vietnamese police's newspaper, Công an nhân dân, subsequently accused Xuân of using her personal Facebook account to share articles, photos and videos "with contents that oppose the Party and the State".

== Arrest, trial and imprisonment ==
On 17 October 2017, provincial police in Hà Tĩnh arrested Xuân as she travelled to church, and charged her with "carrying out activities that aim to overthrow the people's administration" under article 79 of Vietnam's penal code. Hà Tĩnh, a provincial newspaper, reported that Xuân had been a member of Brotherhood for Democracy, which it described as "a reactionary organisation aimed at overthrowing the people's government", and that she had received 170 million VND from terrorist organisations abroad to incite protests within Vietnam.

Four days after her arrest, on 21 October, an estimated three to four thousand people gathered in Thạch Kim commune in Hà Tĩnh calling for her immediate release.

In November 2017, state-run television in Hà Tĩnh broadcast a video of Xuân admitting her guilt and calling on young people not to listen to "reactionary groups" such as Brotherhood for Democracy. She was held at Hà Tĩnh province police detention centre in pre-trial detention.

On 11 April 2018, Xuân's trial took place over one day at the People's Court of Hà Tĩnh Province, culminating in her receiving a nine-year prison sentence, to be followed by five years on probation. Her trial had not been previously announced, meaning her family could not attend; this also resulted in Xuân not having legal representation at the hearing. Xuân's trial occurred the day after a fellow Brotherhood for Democracy activist and the organisation's deputy leader, Nguyễn Văn Tuc, was sentenced to 13 years imprisonment. Xuân is serving her sentence at Prison No. 5 in Thanh Hóa province.

== Response ==
In May 2018, the Văn Hạnh Deanery within the Roman Catholic Diocese of Vinh published a complaint and a petition requesting that her case be reopened by authorities, citing that she had not been granted access to a defence lawyer during her trial, in breach of the criminal procedure code which stated that any defendant accused of a crime that could be punished with the death penalty be granted access to a defence lawyer. They also questioned whether Xuân's arrest was linked to her support of victims of the Formosa ecological disaster.

In June 2018, the Human Rights Foundation submitted an individual complaint to the United Nations Working Group on Arbitrary Detention concerning Xuân and requesting that a formal investigation into her arrest, pre-trial detention, trial and conviction. In May 2019, the group found that Xuân was being arbitrarily detained and called for her immediate release.

Following Xuân's sentencing, Front Line Defenders called on the Vietnamese authorities to quash the sentence against her and other members of Brotherhood for Democracy, and stated that the accusations were "solely intended" to stop peaceful activism.

In November 2021, the UN special rapporteurs sent the Vietnamese government a Joint Allegation Letter raising concerns about the sentences received by several activists, including Xuân, and calling for their immediate releases.

In June 2022, Xuân's family reported that she was suffering from severe gout and receiving inadequate healthcare in prison. They had previously raised concerns in 2020 that she was suffering from coronary occlusion, which eventually led to authorities permitting her treatment at a local hospital; and that improper treatment for kidney disease had led to her experiencing fluid retention in 2021.
