= Trần Thị Nga =

Vietnamese politician (born 1977)

- Born: 28 April 1977 (age 49); Hà Nam
- Known for: Citizen journalism

Trần Thị Nga (born 28 April 1977) is a human rights defender from Hà Nam Province, Vietnam. She was arrested on January 21, 2017 by Vietnamese security police. Nga is member of Vietnamese Women for Human Rights. She also blogs under the pen name Thuy Nga and is known for capturing and hosting videos of police brutality.

== Personal life ==
Nga is married to Phan Văn Phong and has two sons.

== Activism ==
After being abused and exploited as a laborer in Taiwan, Nga spent 3 years recovering in the hospital. During this time, she learned about laborers’ rights. She did not know before then how she should have been treated. Along with advocating for labor and land rights, Nga also participated in anti-China and pro-environment demonstrations, watched blogger and rights activist trials, and paid solidarity visits to the homes of political prisoners. Nga has suffered from many violations because of her activism:

In May 2013, Nga and her young sons were kicked out from the motel at midnight where they slept on the sidewalk in the rain, as instructed by the police.

In May 2014, Nga broke her arm and leg because a group of five men assaulted her with iron rods.

In February 2016, Nga and her sons got shrimp paste thrown at them by civilian clothes men. She injured her eye and her older son had an allergic reaction.

== 2017 arrest and prison sentence ==
On January 21, 2017, Trần Thị Nga and her husband were arrested while at their home in Phủ Lý in Ha Nam Province. Before her arrest, she was monitored and beaten by Vietnamese security police, who began to offer her excuses as to why they harassed her. She was later charged under Article 88 of the penal code “for using the internet to spread some propaganda videos and writings that are against the government of the Socialist Republic of Vietnam.”

In a one-day trial on July 25, 2017, the People's Court in Hà Nam Province sentenced Nga to nine years prison and five years house arrest for "conducting propaganda against the State" under Article 88 of the Vietnamese penal code. Her lawyer, Ha Huy Son, said that "the court convicted our client with an already prepared verdict" and dismisses the charges as "groundless."

Nga's supporters were prevented from entering the courthouse including her husband and two sons. Dozens of activists sat across the courthouse to protest the unfair processes and called for her release. Videos show protesters confronted by plainclothed policemen pulling and tearing the signs from them.

== International response ==
On July 26, 2017, Ted Osius, the United States Ambassador to Vietnam, released a statement and called on "Vietnam to release Tran Thi Nga and all other prisoners of conscience, and to allow all individuals to express their views freely and assemble peacefully without fear of retribution". In the statement, Osius expressed that he was "deeply concerned that a Vietnamese court has convicted peaceful activist Tran Thi Nga to nine years in prison and five years of probation under the vague charge of "propaganda against the State.""

On July 27, 2017, the Asia coordinator of Human Rights Watch, Shayna Bauchner, stated despite that Nga and Ngọc Như Quỳnh's (Mother Mushroom) sentences "serve as retribution for their independence, leadership and solidarity," it does not have the silencing effect as intended for other rights defenders. A February petition signed by 900 activists stated that: "The arrest of Nga will not intimidate people with conscience and bravery. Moreover, this will make the democratic and human rights movement stronger."

Following the arrest of Nga, ARTICLE 19 published a statement on August 1, 2017, called for the immediate release of Nga and urged the Vietnamese government to "quash the conviction of Tran Thi Nga and unconditionally free her from prison. Moreover, the government should take immediate steps to repeal all laws that criminalize voice of the opposition, and end its ongoing crackdown on political dissidents in all forms."

== See also ==
- Human rights in Vietnam
- Peter Nguyen Van Hung
- Nguyễn Văn Oai
- Nguyễn Văn Hoá
