= Hoàng Thị Hồng Thái =

Hong Thai Hoang
- Born: Hoàng Thị Hồng Thái; 1980 (age 45–46)
- Occupations: housewife, blogger
- Known for: democratic activism, 2026 detention
- Website: https://www.facebook.com/ducthaifood

Hoàng Thị Hồng Thái (born 1980) is a Vietnamese human rights and democracy activist known for her social commentary blogging on Facebook. She was arrested in January 2026 for posting comments on Facebook that were deemed to be against the Vietnamese government.

Thái’s post about the National Day parade of the Socialist Republic of Vietnam received attention on Vietnamese social media in 2025.

== Arrest and imprisonment ==
On 8 January 2026, Thái was arrested by Vietnamese police on charges of opposing the state and posting content that was offensive to the Vietnamese government.

On 29 July 2026, a court in Hanoi found Thái guilty of anti-state propaganda and sentenced her to six years in prison.
