= Hong Vo =

Vietnamese Australian social worker

Hong Vo (born 1957) is a Vietnamese Australian social worker from the Melbourne and member of pro-democracy organization Viet Tan who was arrested in Ho Chi Minh City in Vietnam on October 10, 2010 for participating in a peaceful political demonstration in Hanoi, Vietnam affirming Vietnam's sovereignty over the Paracel and Spratly islands. She is being held under Article 84 of Vietnam's penal code, which is often used to charge and convict pro-democracy activists.

== Background ==
Vo came to Australia in 1982 and is currently a social worker for the City of Yarra. She is a single mother of two, and has been active in the Vietnamese community.

== Arrest ==
Vo assisted in organising a peaceful demonstration on October 9, 2010 in Hanoi to affirm Vietnamese sovereignty over the Paracel and Spratly Islands. During the rally which was attended by approximately 70 people, she passed out leaflets, T-shirts, and hats in relation to the Paracel and Spratly Islands dispute.

She was then arrested in the evening of October 10, 2010. The arrest occurred at the airport in Ho Chi Minh City, as Mrs. Vo was boarding a plan to Bangkok. Her son was on a phone call with her, when the call ended abruptly. She was then put into detainment without access to a lawyer.

While Vietnam has alerted the international community on her arrest already on October 11, 2010, authorities in Vietnam did not confirm the arrest until October 12, 2010. She was held under Article 84 of Vietnam's penal code, which is often used to charge and convict pro-democracy activists. During her arrest, her exact whereabouts are unknown, and other than a confirmation that she has been arrested, no further information has been provided by the government.

In a later interview, Vo described that she shared a cell with another prisoner, and was completely isolated from the world. Vo received a visit from the Australian consulate on October 18, 2010.

== Release ==
After the Australian consulate in Vietnam intervened in the case, Hong Vo was released from prison on October 21, 2010 and immediately expelled from the country without the possibility for her to ever return.

She returned to Australia after a total of ten days of detainment. From her experience, she comments that "she will struggle to return to the country of her birth after spending 10 terrifying days in a Vietnamese jail."

== International Response ==
State Labor MP Luke Donnellan, who personally knows Ms Vo well from her community work, promised to file a protest with the Vietnamese Embassy. He comments, "I will tell them how annoyed I am that they have arrested an Australian citizen and incarcerated her. It's totally inappropriate. Especially since we're talking about people handing out leaflets in relation to democracy, not actually any criminal acts".

A Facebook fan page has been created, as well as an online petition to ask for Australian Prime Minister Julia Gillard's assistance in releasing Ms Vo has been created.

Upon her release Viet Tan spokesman Duy Hoang comments that "By releasing her now, the Hanoi government admits that it unjustly detained Hong Vo and that what it labels 'terrorism' is in fact peaceful demands for democracy. Viet Tan will continue to demand the release of the many other democracy activists and bloggers arbitrarily detained in Vietnam."

== Legacies ==
- Inducted into the Victorian Honour Roll of Women in 2001.

== See also ==
- Viet Tan
- Nguyen Quoc Quan
