= Trịnh Bá Phương =

Vietnamese human rights activist (born 1985)

- Born: January 26, 1985 (age 41); Dương Nội, Hanoi, Vietnam
- Known for: Land rights activism
- Criminal charges: Making, storing, disseminating or propagandising information
- Criminal penalty: 10 years imprisonment
- Criminal status: Detained
- Spouse: Đỗ Thị Thu
- Children: 2
- Mother: Cấn Thị Thêu

Trịnh Bá Phương (born 26 January 1985) is a Vietnamese human rights activist. After his family were the victims of land confiscation in 2008, he, alongside his parents and siblings, became noted land rights activists. In 2021, Phương, his mother and his brother received prison terms for "anti-state propaganda", and in 2025, it was announced Phương was facing additional charges for committing the same offence within prison.

== Personal life ==
Phương was born and raised in Dương Nội, a ward of Hanoi. His parents, Trịnh Bá Khiêm and Cấn Thị Thêu, were both farmers. In 2008, the family were victims of land confiscation when the Vietnamese government announced a land acquisition covering Dương Nội, offering a low compensation price. Alongside other local families, the Trinhs ultimately unsuccessfully challenged the decision.

Phương is married to Đỗ Thị Thu, with whom he has two children.

== Activism ==
Following the loss of their land in 2008, Phương, alongside his parents and younger brother, Trịnh Bá Tư, became noted land rights activists. They used social media in addition to participating in protests to publicly oppose land confiscation by the Vietnamese government, in addition to supporting farmers who had lost their land to state developers.

In 2014, Phương's parents Khiêm and Thêu were both given custodial prison sentences for their land rights activism in Dương Nội; Thêu went on to serve an additional sentence in 2016. In 2015, upon Khiêm's release from prison, Phương and his brother Tư were assaulted by a group of unknown assailants while waiting outside Prison No. 6 in Nghệ An province.

On 26 August 2016, Phương was arrested outside of the office of Nguyễn Xuân Phúc, the then-Prime Minister of Vietnam, where he had been publicly appealing for the release of his mother from state custody. He was charged with "disturbing public order" and was placed under house arrest for one year, ending in 2017. Soon afterwards, he was arbitrarily detained for nine hours by plainclothes officers at an unknown location before being released without charge.

=== 2020 Đồng Tâm raid ===
In January 2020, an attempted land confiscation in the Đồng Tâm ward in Hanoi was met with public resistance, which resulted in the death of one farmer and three officers. Phương went on to co-author the Đồng Tâm Report sharing information on the raid. He also broadcast a live stream on social media of security agents blocking entry to Đồng Tâm following the raid, during which he was assaulted by officers; he went on to be arrested and interrogated for several hours before being released. Following the publication of the Đồng Tâm Report, Phương met with officials at the United States embassy, calling on them publicly to apply the Magnitsky Act in order to sanction Vietnamese government officials involved in the organisation of the Đồng Tâm raid.

Following Phương's actions during and after the Đồng Tâm raid he, his mother and his brother were identified as "opposing reactionary persons" in Công an Nhân dân, a police newspaper.

== 2020 arrest, trial and imprisonment ==
In June 2020, Phương was arrested in Hanoi and charged with "making, storing, disseminating or propagandising information, materials and products that aim to oppose the State of the Socialist Republic of Vietnam" in contravention of article 117 of Vietnam's penal code. His mother and brother were arrested on the same charges in Hòa Bình province. During his detention, between 1 and 31 March 2022 Phương was involuntarily detained on a psychiatric ward after refusing to speak in police interviews. In December 2021, Phương was found guilty and sentenced to 10 years imprisonment, to be followed by five years of probation; his mother and brother received eight year sentences. Phương's family members were not permitted to attend the trial.

Since his trial, Phương has made numerous hunger strikes to protest his treatment in prison. In November 2024, he went on a 20 day hunger strike at his prison in Quảng Nam province, after prison guards confiscated his books, papers and pens. He had previously protested his treatment in 2023, which had led to him being shackled and placed in solitary confinement for 10 days and having his family visits reduced.

Phương's family reported that they had experienced intimidation from Vietnamese authorities since the detention of Phương, his mother and brother. In April 2025, his father Khiêm and sister Trịnh Thị Thảo were interrogated by police officers due to their public campaigning for their family members' releases. Phương's wife Thu also reported being under state surveillance.

=== Additional charges ===
In a telephone call on 28 December 2024 with family members, Phương reported that he had been interrogated by police officers on 4 December after signs had been found in Phương's cell with statements including đả đảo cộng sản Việt Nam vi phạm nhằm quyên (lit. 'down with the Communist [Party] of Vietnam for violating human rights') in November. In addition, Phương had been accused of co-writing a statement with other prisoners condemning the treatment of a fellow activist and inmate, Phan Công Hải.

In April 2025, Phương was formally charged by authorities in Quảng Nam province once again under section 117 of the penal code for disseminating "anti-state propaganda". Phương's lawyer challenged the decision, stating that section 117 had not been breached as Phương had criticised the Communist Party of Vietnam and not the Vietnamese state itself. The next hearing was scheduled for 27 September 2025. At that hearing, Phương was sentenced to an additional 11 years imprisonment for criticising the Communist Party.

As of 2026, Phương is serving his sentence at Prison No. 6 in Nghệ An.

=== Response ===
Project 88, a non-governmental organisation advocating for human rights activists in Vietnam, noted that the new charges against Phương marked the first time a Vietnamese prisoner had been prosecuted for expressing their political opinions whilst incarcerated. Human Rights Watch, which described Phương's original sentence as "outrageous", called the new charges "yet another draconian charge against him" and called for them to be dropped.

The Observatory for the Protection of Human Rights Defenders condemned allegations of torture and mistreatment of Phương while in custody, and urged an investigation into the allegations, and called for the immediate release of him, his mother and his brother.
