= Law of Vietnam =

Law of Vietnam consists of interrelated legal norms and rules of conduct, which are divided into legal institutions and branches of law, represented in legal normative documents promulgated by the state within orders, procedures and specific forms.

== System ==
=== Criminal law ===
Criminal law is a branch of law in the Vietnamese legal system, consisting of a system of legal regulations issued by the state, which identify which acts that are dangerous to society are crimes, and at the same time regulate the penalties for crimes.

Article 1 of the Vietnamese Criminal Code 2015 states: The Criminal Code has the mission of protecting the sovereignty of the State, national security, protecting the socialist regime, human rights, citizens' rights, protecting the equality between ethnic groups, protecting the interests of the State, organizations, protecting legal order, combating all criminal acts; educating everyone to obey the law, preventing and combating crime.

=== Civil law ===
Civil law is a branch of law in the Vietnamese legal system, consisting of a collection of regulations governing property relations and certain personal relations in civil transactions on the basis of equality, self-determination, and self-responsibility of the subjects participating in civil relations.

== See also ==
- Constitution of the Socialist Republic of Vietnam
- Judiciary of Vietnam
- Supreme People's Procuracy of Vietnam
