= Nguyen Quoc Quan =

Vietnamese-American mathematician and human rights activist

Nguyễn Quốc Quân
- Nguyễn Quốc Quân
- Born: 20 November 1953 (age 72); Hanoi, French Indochina
- Occupation: mathematics researcher
- Known for: democracy activist
- Website: www.viettan.org

Dr. Nguyễn Quốc Quân (born November 20, 1953) is a Vietnamese-born American mathematics researcher and human rights activist and a member of the leadership committee of the anti-communist organization Việt Tân. He was detained on April 17, 2012, after arriving at Tân Sơn Nhất airport in Ho Chi Minh City (Saigon), Vietnam. On April 28, 2012, Vietnam's state media reported the "pro-democracy activist" has been arrested and accused of organizing "terrorism" activities. Previously, Dr Quân was arrested in Ho Chi Minh City in Vietnam on a trip on November 17, 2007, for preparing pro-democracy flyers. During that first trip, he brought in a Vietnamese translation of the book From Dictatorship to Democracy about nonviolent resistance. He stood trial in Vietnam on May 13, 2008, on charges of "terrorism" and was sentenced to 6 months in prison. He was eventually released on May 17, 2008, and returned to his home in Elk Grove, California, to his wife and two teenage sons. In 2012, he was re-arrested on another trip to Vietnam, and held in prison for 9 months. Following intense US pressure, he was deported on January 30, 2013.

== Background ==
Nguyễn Quốc Quân is a former high school math teacher in Kiên Giang, Vietnam. He escaped from Vietnam on a fishing boat in 1981, ending up in the United States where he earned a doctorate degree in mathematics from North Carolina State University. He has also practiced software engineering. He is a long-time democracy activist, a devotee of Martin Luther King Jr. and member of senior leadership committee of Việt Tân.

== 2007 arrest ==
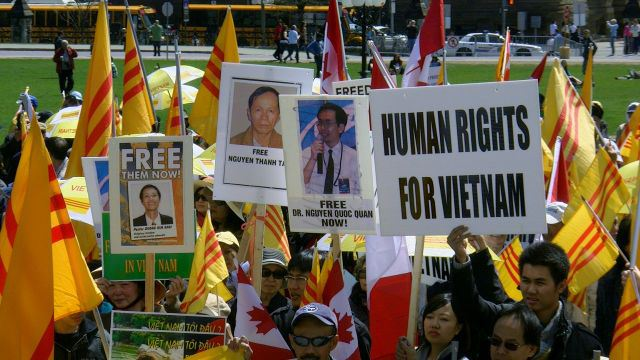
Vietnamese pro-democracy rally demanding for the release of Nguyen Quoc Quan

Nguyễn Quốc Quân entered Vietnam on November 15, 2007, on a bicycle through the Cambodian border.

On November 17, 2007, along with two other Việt Tân members (Trương Văn Ba, a Hawaiian restaurant owner, and Frenchwoman Nguyễn Thị Thanh Vân, a contributor to Việt Tân's Radio Chân Trời Mới radio show) he was arrested in the southern suburb of Ho Chi Minh City. At the time, they were leading a "democracy seminar" and preparing pro-democracy pamphlets, when 20 security officers raided the house. Also arrested in the same group were Vietnamese citizens Nguyễn Thế Vũ, Nguyễn Trọng Khiêm, Nguyễn Việt Trung and Thai journalist Somsak Khunmi.

The two-page pamphlet titled "Non-Violent Struggle: The Approach To Overcome Dictatorship" (translated from Vietnamese) and protesters to "faithfully maintain the discipline of non-violence."

The arrests were not officially confirmed by the Vietnamese government until November 22, 2007. During the press briefing, officials declined to state which laws the detained individuals have broken, nor released any information about Nguyễn Quốc Quân, whose whereabouts remained unknown for almost a week.

At the beginning, state-controlled media in Vietnam acknowledged jailing only some, but not all activists. The website of the newspaper Sài Gòn Giải Phóng originally showed an image of US national Nguyễn Quốc Quân wearing prison garb, but hours later replaced it with a manipulated image of him wearing a white shirt. Subsequent articles also listed his nationality as "unknown".

Authorities in Vietnam have attempted to link the arrest of these Việt Tân members to two Vietnamese Americans who reportedly attempted to smuggle firearms into the country six days after the original arrests. However, Việt Tân has firmly denied any association with those individuals.

=== International response ===
The arrest was condemned by organizations and individuals worldwide including Reporters Without Borders and Human Rights Watch. In a letter to US Secretary of State Condoleezza Rice, US representatives Loretta Sanchez, Zoe Lofgren, and Neil Abercrombie wrote "Not only do we ask you to work to return these United States citizens to the United States, but we ask you to convey to the government of Vietnam that the arbitrary detention of United States citizens is unacceptable."

Coinciding with Human Rights Day on December 10, 2008, 11 members of the United States Congress wrote a joint letter to the prime minister of Vietnam inquiring why the group of people are being detained in Vietnam and when they will be returned to their families in the United States.

=== Appeal for release ===
In response to the detention, California-based Việt Tân organized an international campaign under the name of Free Them Now that included a petition demanding for an immediate release. The petition collected more than 18,000 signatures. In addition, an international lobbying campaign was undertaken to rally support of Western government officials behind this issue, including many elected officials from the United States, Norway, France and Australia. The broad support of this campaign by many officials is credited for his eventual release.

On January 7, 2008, fifty-five members of the California Assembly signed a letter to the President of Vietnam, stating the "arbitrary detention of these individuals is unacceptable" and requested their immediate release.

On March 12, 2008, chairman of Viet Tan, Đỗ Hoàng Điềm, appeared before the US Senate Foreign Relations Committee's Subcommittee on East Asian and Pacific Affairs along with Nguyễn Quốc Quân's wife to appeal to lawmakers to confront the issue. The next day, U.S. Representative Zoe Lofgren (D-CA) sponsored and introduced a house resolution condemning the detention of Dr. Nguyễn Quốc Quân, and calls for a removal of permanent normal trade relations status with Vietnam until Dr. Nguyễn is released. Co-sponsors of the bill include U.S. representatives Steven Chabot (R-OH), Thomas Davis (R-VA), Bob Filner (D-CA), Nicholas Lampson (D-TX), Daniel Lungren (R-CA), Michael McNulty (D-NY), Ileana Ros-Lehtinen (R-FL) and Frank Wolf (R-VA).

Angela P. Aggeler, secretary for press and cultural affairs at the U.S. Embassy in Hà Nội, said "U.S. officials both here in Vietnam and in Washington have repeatedly called for the release of any individual for peacefully expressing his or her views and we have urged them to release Dr. Quân and that he be allowed to return to the United States as swiftly as possible".

=== Detention ===
During Nguyễn Quốc Quân's detention in Vietnam along with Thai citizen Somsak Khumni and Vietnamese businessman Nguyen The Vu, the U.S. consulate was allowed to visit him only once per month. Family visits were prohibited altogether. His wife was first granted a visa to visit him in January 2008, though the Vietnamese consulate revoked the visa one week prior her scheduled trip. She was able to talk to him only after his release 6 months later.

=== Trial and sentence ===
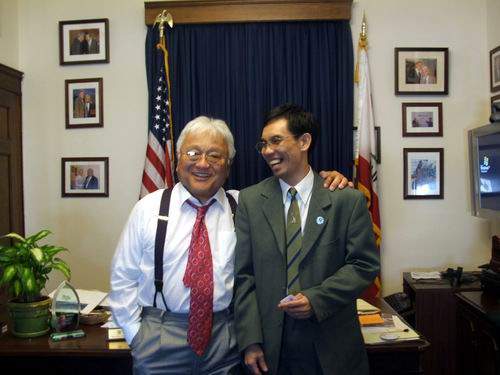
Democracy activist visits with US Congressman Mike Honda in 2008, after his release from prison in Vietnam

Nguyễn Quốc Quân along with the other two remaining detainees, Nguyễn Thế Vũ, and Somsak Kunmi stood trial in Vietnam on May 13, 2008. Officials from the U.S. consulate attended the behind-the-doors trial. Nguyễn Quốc Quân was sentenced to six months in prison, but since he has already served that time, was released on May 17, 2008. Nguyên Thế Vũ was released immediately, and Somsak Kunmi will server another three months before he will be released. Other than the sentences, the preceding judge would not release any further detail of the trial.

Following the sentencing, a U.S. Embassy spokeswoman in Hà Nội said in a statement: "We welcome his release and return to the United States. We remain disappointed by the decision of the Government of Vietnam to charge Dr. Quân with 'terrorism.' We are not aware of any information that would support charges of 'terrorism'. We object to the detention and prosecution of any individual for peacefully expressing his or her own views."

Michael Orona, The US State Department deputy director overseeing human rights, said that Quân "should not have been arrested in the first place."

When Dr. Quân returned to United States on May 17, 2008, he was greeted by a group of cheering supporters, including Sacramento assemblyman Dave Jones.

== 2012 arrest ==
On April 17, 2012, Dr. Quân was at the Tân Sơn Nhất Airport, when he called his wife and told her that he will call again shortly when he arrives at the hotel. Shortly after the phone call, he was then arrested at the airport in Ho Chi Minh City. Government officials did not confirm his arrest until five days later. He was detained on charges of terrorism and for planning to "instigate a demonstration" during the anniversary of the Fall of Saigon. The charges were later changed to subversion of the state. He is being detained for at least four months. According to his wife, he was planning to visit his younger sister and "talk about democracy and the rule of law". The U.S. consulate in Vietnam has confirmed that he has been arrested, but no formal charges have been filed and has not been granted a lawyer. Since his arrest, the US consulate was able to visit him only once.

=== International response ===
Upon his 2012 arrest, Việt Tân released a statement that the Vietnamese government's accusation of 'terrorism' against Quân is "completely fabricated and has no basis." The Wall Street Journal, in its April 30 editorial, notes that the Vietnamese government holds a radically different definition of "terrorism," citing the authorities recent arrests of American citizens for crimes that aren't crimes in any normal country. Six members of the U.S. Congress signed a letter to Secretary of State Hillary Clinton and urged the State Department to call for Dr. Quân's immediate release on grounds that the Vietnamese government is "abusing its vague national security provisions as the pretext to arrest and detain individuals who peacefully advocate for religious and political freedom." Luke Simpkins, a Member of the Australian Parliament, has stated that the accusations by the Vietnamese government against Dr Quân are "completely fabricated and have no basis".

=== Appeal for release ===
(Note: in Vietnamese customs, the wife does not need to change her surname when married).

On April 14, 2012, Dr Quân's wife, Ngô Mai Hương, went before a House of Representative panel to appeal for help in releasing her husband. She specifically requested the help of Secretary of State Hillary Clinton. Australian Member of Parliament Luke Simpkins also called for unconditional and immediate release of Dr Quân and all other voices of conscience. On May 17, US House Representatives Frank Wolf, Dan Lungren, Zoe Lofgren, Loretta Sanchez and Bob Filner co-signed a letter addressed urging U.S. Ambassador David Shear to "work to secure (Nguyễn’s) immediate release so he can be reunited with his wife and two sons."

On January 11, 2013, as the trial date was announced, US representatives Zoe Lofgren, Loretta Sanchez, Hang Johnson and Gerry Connolly repeated writing a letter to David Shear, US ambassador to Vietnam, asking him to take "immediate actions to secure the release of Dr. Nguyễn Quốc Quân."

=== 2013 release ===
His trial was set for January 22, 2013. However, prior to the trial was to take place, it was postponed with no explanation. If charged, he could face up a ten years in prison. Following intense US diplomatic pressure, he was released, deported on January 30, 2013. He was reunited with his family after arriving in Los Angeles Airport on January 30, 2013.

== See also ==
- Human rights in Vietnam
- Viet Tan
- Lê Quốc Quân
- Do Hoang Diem
- Duy Hoang
- Hong Vo
