= Supreme People's Court of Vietnam =

Supreme judicial body of Vietnam

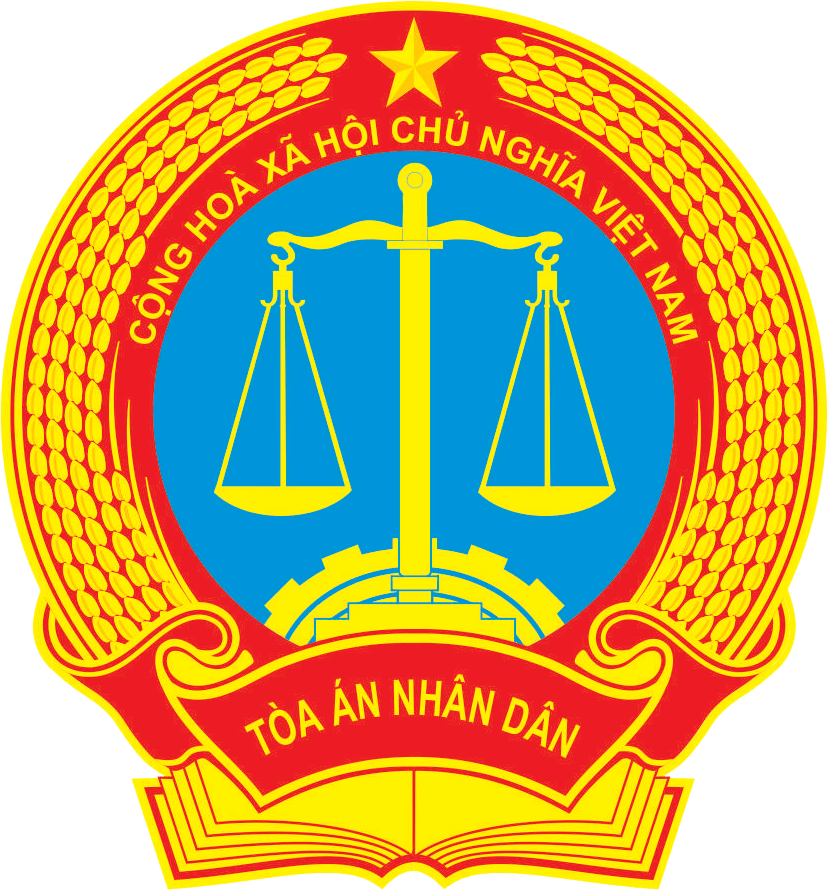
- Emblem of the Vietnam People's Courts

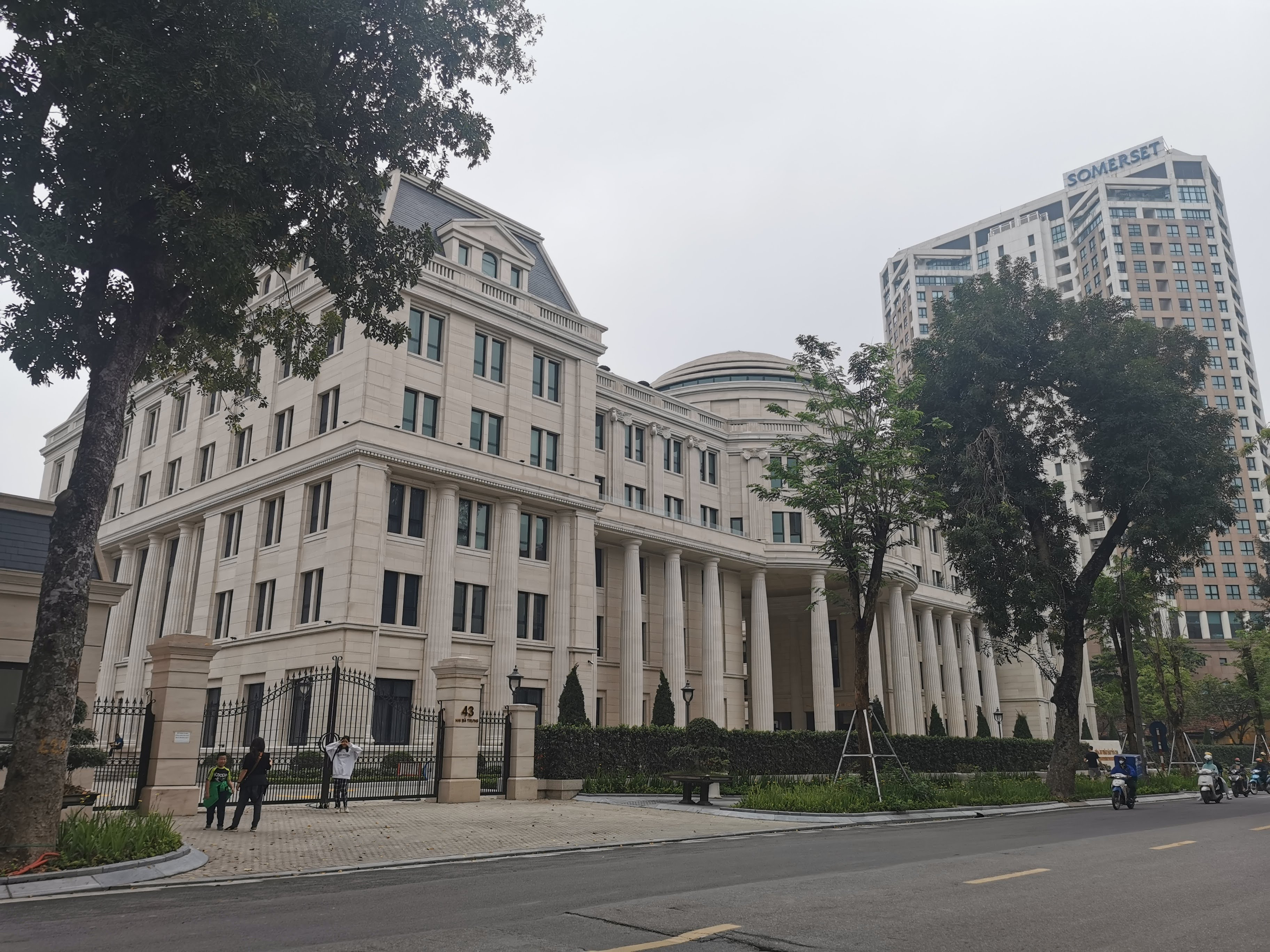
- Interactive map of Supreme People's Court of Vietnam
- Established: 13 September 1945
- Jurisdiction: Vietnam
- Location: Hanoi
- Composition method: Presidential nomination with confirmation from the National Assembly
- Authorised by: Constitution of Vietnam
- Judge term length: Five years
- Number of positions: 13–17, by statute
- Website: www.toaan.gov.vn

Chief Justice of the Supreme People's Court of Vietnam
- Currently: Nguyễn Văn Quảng
- Since: 10 November 2025

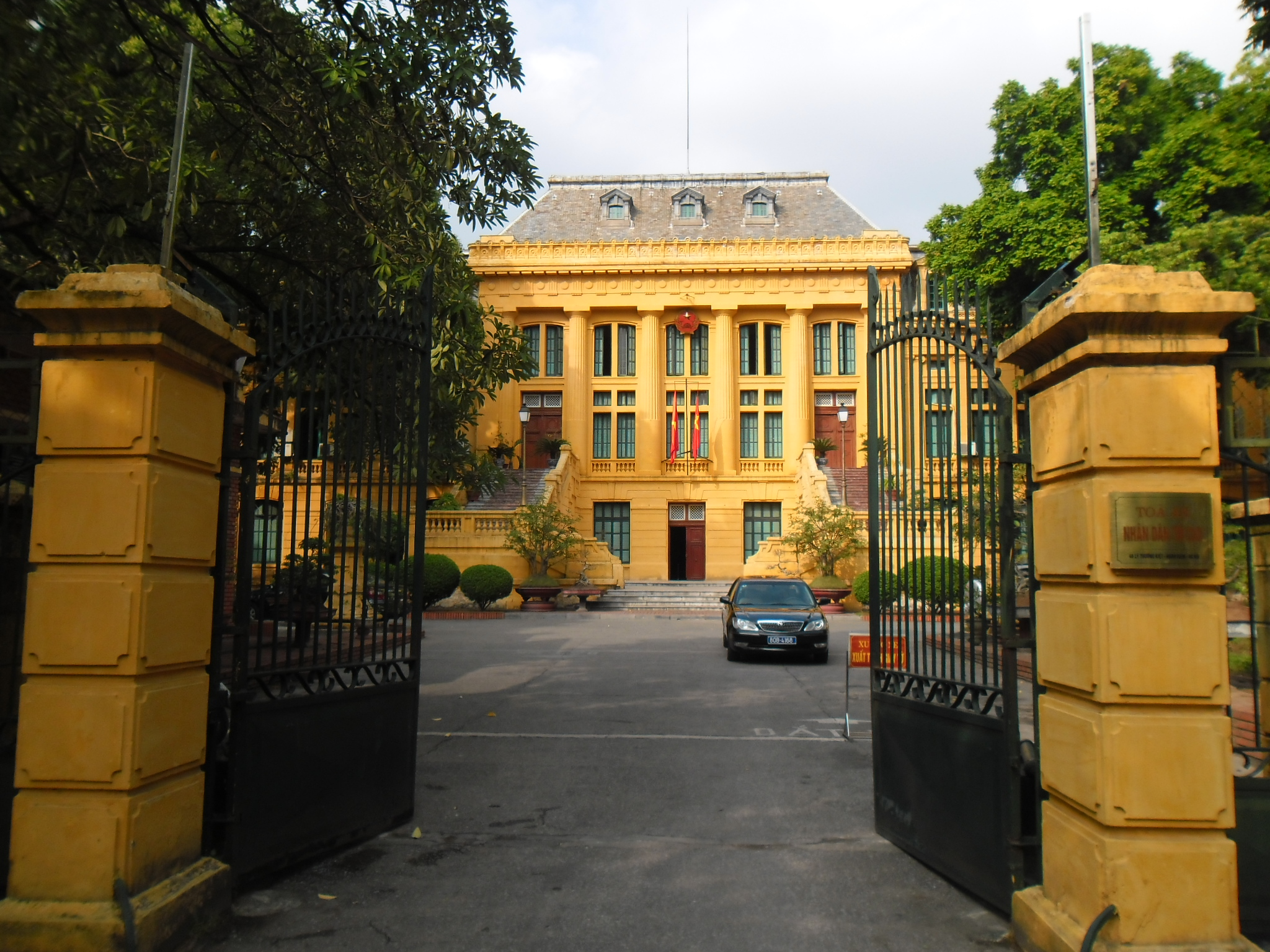
Headquarters.

The Supreme People's Court of Vietnam (Vietnamese: Tòa án nhân dân tối cao) is the supreme judicial organ of the Socialist Republic of Vietnam. It is one of the two institutions at the apex of the judicial system of Vietnam, with the other body being the Supreme People's Procuracy of Vietnam. Both are accountable to the President of Vietnam, the highest institution of government power in the country. The head of the Supreme People's Court of Vietnam is the Chief Justice.

== Responsibility and jurisdiction ==
The Supreme People's Court is responsible for providing leadership to the Vietnamese court system, supervising the judicial process, and recommending bills to the National Assembly as appropriate under law. It is a court of final resort.

The Court is by statute the court of final resort for all matters arising under Vietnamese law. It hears appeals in cases where decisions of lower courts have been implemented. The Court's Council of Justices can also pass resolutions directing lower courts on the uniform enforcement of the law across the country.

Prior to June 2015, when parts of the Law on the Organisation of People's Courts (2014) and several resolutions by the Standing Committee of the National Assembly took effect, the Supreme People's Court also had some intermediate appellate jurisdiction via its three appellate benches (toà phúc thẩm). The 2014 law transformed those appellate benches into full courts called superior people's courts (toà án nhân dân cấp cao), and removed intermediate appellate jurisdiction from the Supreme People's Court.

== Organisation ==
The Court's Council of Justices consists of the Chief Justice, the Deputy Chief Justices, and other justices of the Supreme People's Court as appointed by the National Assembly on nomination by the President. It must have at least 13 members, and at most 17 members. Appeals are heard by panels of five justices, or by the entire Council of Justices when appropriate under law.

The Supreme People's Court of Vietnam consists of:

- Council of Justices (Hội đồng Thẩm phán): 17 judges, including the Chief Justice and Deputy Chief Justices
- Office of the Supreme People's Court (Văn phòng Tòa án Nhân dân Tối cao)
- Assisting apparatus
- High People's Courts (Tòa án Nhân dân Cấp cao): currently there are 3 High People's Courts (High People's Court in Northern region, High People's Court in Central region and High People's Court in Southern region). The High People's Courts consist of:
  - Committee of Judges (Ủy ban Thẩm phán)
  - Criminal Court (Tòa Hình sự)
  - Civil Court (Tòa Dân sự)
  - Administrative Court (Tòa Hành chính)
  - Economic Court (Tòa Kinh tế)
  - Labor Court (Tòa Lao động)
  - Family and Juvenile Court (Tòa Gia đình và Người chưa thành niên)

== Chief justices ==
Number	Name	Term	Political party
Democratic Republic of Vietnam (1945–1976)
-	Trần Công Tường (acting)	5/1958–5/1959	Worker's Party of Vietnam
1	Phạm Văn Bạch	5/1959–7/1976	Worker's Party of Vietnam
Socialist Republic of Vietnam (1976–)
1	Phạm Văn Bạch	7/1976–5/1981	Communist Party of Vietnam
2	Phạm Hưng	1981–1997	Communist Party of Vietnam
3	Trịnh Hồng Dương	1997–2002	Communist Party of Vietnam
4	Nguyễn Văn Hiện	2002–2007	Communist Party of Vietnam
5	Trương Hòa Bình	2007–2016	Communist Party of Vietnam
6	Nguyễn Hòa Bình	2016–2024	Communist Party of Vietnam
7	Lê Minh Trí	2024–2025	Communist Party of Vietnam
8	Nguyễn Văn Quảng	2025–incumbent	Communist Party of Vietnam
