= Chau Van Kham =

Australian democracy activist

Chau Van Kham (Vietnamese: Châu Văn Khảm; born 1949) is an Australian democracy activist who was identified by Amnesty International Australia as being a prisoner of conscience after he was imprisoned in Vietnam between 2019 and 2023 on disputed charges of "financing terrorism".

== Early life and career ==
Chau was born in what was then French Indochina. During the Tet Offensive in 1968, he survived the Battle of Huế, where he had been studying. He later served as a soldier in the Army of the Republic of Vietnam before 1975. Following the end of the Vietnam War, he was sent to a re-education camp, where he remained for three years before fleeing Vietnam by boat.

Chau settled in Australia in 1983, where he ran a launderette in Sydney before working as a baker for several decades until he retired. At the time of his arrest, he was married with two children.

== Activism ==
Chau had fought for South Vietnam during the Vietnam War. In 2010, he joined Việt Tân, a United States-based organisation that aims to establish a liberal democracy in Vietnam. Việt Tân was subsequently proscribed as a terrorist group by the Government of Vietnam in 2016, though the United Nations described it as "a peaceful organisation advocating for democratic reform". Việt Tân operates legally in Australia, where Chau went on to become a prominent member of its New South Wales chapter, regularly taking part in events calling for increased transparency and civil rights in Vietnam.

== Arrest and imprisonment ==
=== Arrest ===
Chau had planned to travel to Vietnam to meet with democracy activists in January 2019. After being refused a visa by the Vietnamese government, he ultimately entered the country through its land border with Cambodia using false documents. On 13 January, he was arrested in Ho Chi Minh City, alongside Vietnamese citizens Nguyễn Văn Viễn and Trần Văn Quyền, on charges of "financing terrorism" linked to his membership of Việt Tân; it was reported that either Nguyễn or Trần were likely being surveilled by authorities. The Ministry of Public Security subsequently announced that Chau Van Kham had held a senior position within the New South Wales chapter of Việt Tân; that he had entered Vietnam illegally using false documents; and that he had given $400 to a Việt Tân member.

=== Pre-trial detention and trial ===
Chau was remanded following his arrest. In July 2019, prosecutors announced their intention to charge Chau with "terrorism that aim to oppose the people's administration". In November 2019, his single-day trial in Ho Chi Minh City, he was sentenced to 12 years imprisonment; at the same trial, Nguyễn andTrần were sentenced to 11 and 10 years, respectively. Chau was also ordered to be deported back to Australia following the completion of his sentence.

Chau dismissed his trial as a "sham", with his lawyers stating that he had only been permitted one half-hour meeting with them during the ten months he was detained ahead of his trial. Chau made an application to return to Australia under the International Transfer of Prisoners scheme following his sentencing.

=== National and international response ===
Đỗ Hoàng Điềm, the then-chairman of Việt Tân, stated that Chau had entered Vietnam to gain "first-hand insight" into the country's human rights situation and stated that he had not committed any crimes.

Human Rights Watch called Chau's sentence "essentially a death sentence", citing his age and poor prison conditions in Vietnam, calling on his immediate and unconditional release. Amnesty International Australia described Chau as a "prisoner of conscience", stating he had been detained solely for his political beliefs due to the only evidence used against him being his membership of Việt Tân. The United Nations' Working Group on Arbitrary Detention labelled Chau as "forcibly disappeared" in 2022.

Chau's family stated that they were unable to see him during his pre-trial detention and for several months did not know where he was being held. They called on the Australian Government to protect Chau's "rights and interests", voicing concern that the then-Prime Minister of Australia Scott Morrison had not raised Chau's ongoing detainment when he met with the then-Prime Minister of Vietnam Nguyễn Xuân Phúc in 2019. In December 2019, Chau's wife, Quynh Tran Truong, met with representatives from the Department of Foreign Affairs and Trade in Canberra.

The response of the Australian government was initially criticised; The Guardian described its public advocacy for Chau as being "subdued" when compared to similar cases, including the detentions of Yang Hengjun in China, Alek Sigley in North Korea, and Hakeem al-Araibi in Thailand. Human Rights Watch queried whether the government's muted response was linked to an increase in trade with Vietnam following a strategic partnership between the country and Australia in 2018 and called on the Australian government to prioritise the rights of Australian citizens over political concerns. In August 2019, Morrison publicly commented that "Australians need to abide by the laws of countries which they visit".

The Australian government's subsequent actions concerning Chau were more praised; in July 2022, when the Minister for Foreign Affairs Penny Wong raised Chau's imprisonment with Nguyễn Xuân Phúc, by then the President of Vietnam, along with the prime minister, Phạm Minh Chính, and her Vietnamese counterpart, Bùi Thanh Sơn, it was noted as the 70th such appeal of the Australian government since Chau had been imprisoned. In June 2023, the new Prime Minister of Australia, Anthony Albanese, raised Chau's imprisonment during a state visit to Vietnam to mark 50 years of Australia–Vietnam relations.

=== Release ===
Chau was released from prison on humanitarian grounds in July 2023 and was subsequently deported to Australia. Albanese publicly stated he "very much welcomes the release of Chau Van Kham", while his deputy, Richard Marles, thanked the Vietnamese government for its decision to release Chau, stating they did so "on the basis of humanitarian grounds and in the spirit of friendship that exists between Australia and Vietnam". Human Rights Watch, as well as Chau's family, thanked the Australian government for its advocacy and "high-level diplomacy", while noting that 150 people remained imprisoned in Vietnam for peaceful democratic activism.

In an interview after his release, Chau said he was "not afraid" of dying in prison, and that he knew his supporters in Australia would not give up on him. He currently lives in Sydney with his wife.
