= Independent Journalists Association of Vietnam =

- Native name: Hội Nhà Báo Độc Lập Việt Nam
- Website type: Online newspaper
- Available in: Vietnamese
- Founder: Phạm Chí Dũng
- Website: https://vietnamthoibao.org/

The Independent Journalists Association of Vietnam (IJAVN) is a media group that reports freely without government control in Vietnam. It was founded by Phạm Chí Dũng. Since 1975, all media in Vietnam has been strictly controlled by a single party. Freedom of the press is declared in Article 19 of the Constitution of the Socialist Republic of Vietnam. News or information that poses political challenges can lead to convictions under Articles 109, 117, and 331 of the Penal Code for activities aimed at overthrowing the government, anti-state propaganda, or abuses of rights related to freedom and democracy. In 2021, IJAVN president Pham Chi Dung was sentenced to 15 years in prison, while vice president Nguyen Tuong Thuy and editor Le Huu Minh Tuan received sentences of 11 years each. Their trial reportedly lasted less than four hours.
