= 2016 Vietnam marine life disaster =

2016 water pollution crisis in central Vietnam

- Native name: Cá chết hàng loạt ở Việt Nam năm 2016
- Date: April to July, 2016
- Location: Hà Tĩnh, Quảng Bình, Quảng Trị and Thừa Thiên–Huế provinces, Vietnam
- Cause: Large source of toxin from factory complex of Formosa Ha Tinh Company.
- Deaths: 1 diver + 115 tons of dead fish drift along the coast, 140 tons of fish and 67 tons of clam raised
- Injuries: 450 hectares of coral reefs have been damaged from 40 to 60%
- Suspects: Formosa Ha Tinh Steel

The 2016 Vietnam marine life disaster was a water pollution crisis affecting Hà Tĩnh, Quảng Bình, Quảng Trị and Thừa Thiên–Huế provinces in central Vietnam.

Fish carcasses were reported to have washed up on the beaches of Hà Tĩnh province from at least 6 April 2016. Later, a large number of dead fish were found on the coast of Hà Tĩnh and three other provinces (Quảng Bình, Quảng Trị and Thừa Thiên–Huế) until 18 April 2016. Formosa Ha Tinh Steel, a steel plant built by the Taiwanese corporation Formosa Plastics, discharged toxic industrial waste illegally into the ocean through drainage pipes. After denying responsibility for months, Formosa accepted responsibility for the fish deaths on 30 June 2016.

The massive marine life destruction led to a number of protests by Vietnamese citizens in some cities on 1 May 2016, calling for a cleaner environment and demanding transparency in the investigation process.

== Causes ==
The Formosa steel plant is suspected to be the source of the toxic chemical waste. The company admitted that there was a sewage pipe connecting the plant and the ocean and it was reported that several days before the incident, 300 tonnes (300 long tons; 330 short tons) of chemicals were imported by Formosa in order to clean the pipe. Formosa was later ordered by Vietnamese authorities to remove those sewage pipes. However, the Vietnamese government denied that the Formosa steel plant was linked to the disaster.

Vietnamese scientists largely agreed that the source of toxins was from the Vũng Áng Economic Zone, in which the Formosa steel plant was located; meanwhile, the Vietnamese government was accused of concealing the findings from the public.

In a press conference held on 27 April, Võ Tuấn Nhân, the Deputy Minister of Natural Resources and Environment, claimed that the two main suspects of the marine life destruction were red tide and toxins generated by people. However, the red tide explanation was quickly rejected by the Vietnamese Fisheries Society.

At 5:00 PM on 30 June 2016, the Government Office held a press conference to announce the causes and perpetrators of this particularly serious environmental disaster. Accordingly, the Natural Resources and Environment Ministry and other relevant units have checked and discovered violations regarding Formosa discharging toxic waste into the sea waste water containing toxins exceeding the permitted level. Based on the ground-level investigation, "the Vietnamese authorities along with the participation of scientists had concluded that Formosa was responsible for this environment pollution that led to marine life disaster."

== Effects and responses ==
Nguyễn Xuân Phúc, the Prime Minister of Vietnam, claimed that the massive marine life destruction was "the most serious environmental disaster Vietnam has ever faced".

By 29 April, approximately 80 tonnes (79 long tons; 88 short tons) of fish carcasses had been washed up to the shores of four central provinces of Vietnam from Hà Tĩnh to Thừa Thiên–Huế. On 6 May, the amount of collected fish carcasses surpassed 100 tonnes (98 long tons; 110 short tons).

The disaster disrupted the livelihood of fishermen in four provinces in the central coast of Vietnam. On 4 May 2016, Vietnamese government had announced a ban of processing and selling seafood caught within 20 nautical miles of central Vietnam provinces, just one day after the Ministry of Natural Resources and Environment had claimed that the seafood in the region met safety standards.

According to the local government of Quảng Bình, the fishermen of this province had already lost $5.2 million; in addition, the disaster also heavily impacted the tourism industry as nearly 30% tourists cancelled their planned tours to the affected provinces for the national holiday season starting on 30 April.

== Protests ==
2016 Vietnam protests
- Date: 1 May 2016 – April 2017
- Location: Across Vietnam, including: Ho Chi Minh City; Ha Tinh Province; Quang Binh; Nghe An; Quang Tri; Ha Noi; Some countries such as United States, Taiwan, Japan,...
- Caused by: 2016 Vietnam marine life disaster; How to handle the case of the government; People's dissatisfaction with the government; Economic and social inequality
- Goals: Requesting the government and Formosa Ha Tinh Group to compensate and remedy damage to fishermen in Nghe An, Ha Tinh, Quang Binh, Quang Tri .
- Methods: Demonstrations; Nonviolent resistance; Online activism; Civil disobedience; General strikes; Riots
- Result: Many people were arrested; Formosa Corporation declares compensation and remedy the consequences of the incident; Many leaders involved in the case were dismissed; The problem is completely fixed from the end of 2021

Parties
Fishermen in Nghe An, Ha Tinh, Quang Binh, Quang Tri; Catholic Church in Vietnam; Roman Catholic Diocese of Hà Tĩnh; Roman Catholic Diocese of Vinh; Green Trees; No-U Movement; Supported by: Việt Tân (alleged, denied)	Government of Vietnam: Communist Party of Vietnam; Politburo; Ministry of Public Security; Vietnam People’s Public Security Forces; People’s Army of Vietnam; Vietnam Self-Defence Militia; pro-government counterprotesters; Formosa Ha Tinh Steel

Lead figures
Nguyễn Văn Hoá; Lê Đình Lượng; Nguyễn Ngọc Như Quỳnh; Paul Nguyễn Thái Hợp; Đặng Hữu Nam; Lê Đình Thục	Nguyễn Xuân Phúc; Nguyễn Phú Trọng; Trần Đại Quang; Tô Lâm

On 5 March 2017, protesters gathered on Nguyễn Du Street and in front of the Ho Chi Minh City post office. Police tried to disperse the protesters. Overseas Vietnamese also joined in protest around the world, demanding greater action about Formosa and protesting police abuse of protesters. The event was also mentioned by the Vietnamese media as the Fish Revolution.

== Government response ==
The Vietnamese government has cracked down on protests, including arresting Nguyễn Văn Hoá, a journalist who covered the Formosa protests. He was charged for "conducting propaganda against the state" under Article 88 of the Vietnamese Penal Code and sentenced to seven years prison. Lê Đình Lượng, another citizen journalist, was arrested for "activities attempting to overthrow the state" in July 2017. He was later sentenced to 20 years prison and 5 years house arrest in August 2018. State media also accused "hostile elements", as well as some of "taking advantage of religion" to incite protests.

== See also ==
- Nguyễn Văn Hoá
- Lê Đình Lượng
- Environmental issues in Vietnam
- 2014 Vietnam anti-China protests, which also targeted the Formosa steel mill
