= Mother Mushroom =

Vietnamese blogger and dissident

Nguyễn Ngọc Như Quỳnh
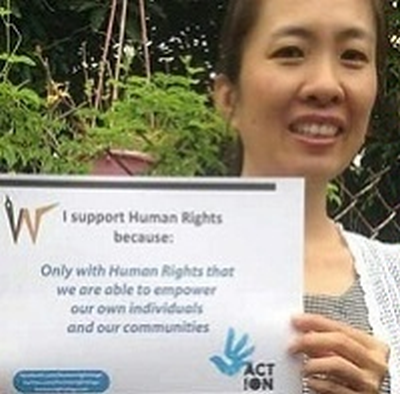
- Born: 1979 (age 46–47); Khánh Hòa, Vietnam
- Occupations: blogger, political activist
- Organization: Network of Vietnamese Bloggers
- Known for: human rights activism
- Awards: Hellman-Hammett award 2010; Civil Rights Defender of the Year (2015)

Mother Mushroom (Vietnamese: Mẹ Nấm; born 1979 in Khánh Hòa, Vietnam) is the pen name of the Vietnamese blogger and dissident, Nguyễn Ngọc Như Quỳnh.

== Blogging and arrests ==
Quỳnh writes blogs under the pseudonym Mẹ Nấm (Mother Mushroom) and has openly criticised the Vietnamese government over its human rights violations and corruption. She began blogging in 2006 when she visited a hospital and witnessed many poor people in the hot sun desperately waiting for treatment, but ignored because they lacked money to bribe hospital officials.

In 2012, Quỳnh was one of the first interns of the Vietnamese Overseas Initiative for Conscience Empowerment.

In 2013 she co-founded the Network of Vietnamese Bloggers with Phạm Đoan Trang.

=== 2009 arrest ===
Quỳnh was first arrested in 2009 for blogging about government land confiscations related to a Chinese-backed bauxite mine and for printing T-shirts opposing the bauxite project. She was released nine days later, after she promised to close the blog.

=== 2013 arrests ===
On 21 May 2013, Quỳnh and fellow blogger Binh Nhì Nguyễn Tiến Nam were arrested and interrogated for several hours by the Khánh Hòa provincial police after publicly distributing copies of the Universal Declaration of Human Rights alongside balloons reading "quyền của con người phải được tôn trọng" (lit. 'human rights must be respected'). On 15 December 2023, Quỳnh was detained at an airport and had her passport confiscated while attempting to fly to Bangkok, Thailand to meet with a representative of the United Nations High Commissioner for Human Rights.

=== 2014 arrest ===
On 19 April 2014, Quỳnh was arrested alongside Paulo Thành Nguyễn and Trịnh Kim Tiến by police in Nha Trang while preparing to give a talk on the United Nations Convention Against Torture. Quỳnh was accused of "insulting and discrediting the People's Public Security of Vietnam" following social media posts made ahead of the talk in which she presented cases of 31 people who had died while in police custody in Vietnam.

=== 2015 arrests ===
On 28 March 2015, Quỳnh was arrested in Nha Trang while preparing to travel to Hanoi to present a petition at the 132nd session of the Inter-Parliamentary Union. She was arrested again on 25 July while taking part in a hunger strike in support of imprisoned activists Nguyễn Ngọc Già, Bùi Thị Minh Hằng and Trần Huỳnh Duy Thức.

=== 2016 arrest ===
On 10 October 2016, Mother Mushroom was arrested while trying to visit an imprisoned political activist. The Office of the United Nations High Commissioner for Human Rights reported that she was arrested in Khánh Hòa and charged with crimes under Article 88 of Vietnam's Penal Code, which prohibits "conducting propaganda against the Socialist Republic of Viet Nam."

==== Reactions ====
The United States, the European Union and UN High Commissioner for Human Rights demanded Mother Mushroom's release and stated that the government's arrest of her violated international human rights norms, as well as Vietnam's domestic laws on human rights. Ted Osius, the United States Ambassador to Vietnam said he was "deeply concerned" about the Vietnamese government's detention of activists and stated: "This trend threatens to overshadow Vietnam's progress on human rights."

Bärbel Kofler, the Human Rights Commissioner for the German Federal Government, issued a statement on 11 October on the arrest: "... this would be another serious violation of the human rights principles and international rules that Viet Nam has made a commitment to uphold."

Zeid Ra'ad Al Hussein, the United Nations High Commissioner for Human Rights, said in a news release: "Article 88 effectively makes it a crime for any Vietnamese citizen to enjoy the fundamental freedom to express an opinion, to discuss or to question the Government and its policies. The overly broad, ill-defined scope of this law makes it all too easy to quash any kind of dissenting views and to arbitrarily detain individuals who dare to criticize Government policies."

=== 2017 sentencing ===
On 29 June 2017, she was sentenced to 10 years of jail by a court in Khánh Hòa Province after being found guilty of publishing propaganda against the state.

== Exile ==
On 17 October 2018, she was released from prison and exiled. She and her family were granted political asylum in the United States.

From 2019 to 2023, she wrote for the Vietnamese website Tiếng Dân.

== Awards ==
- Human Rights Watch, Hellman/Hammett grant program recipient (2010)
- Civil Rights Defenders, Defender of the Year (2015) Speaking with RFA's Vietnamese Service after she won the award, she said: "I still wish I did not have to receive such awards, because I live in an authoritarian country and I got the awards for fighting efforts."
- International Women of Courage Award (2017).
- International Press Freedom Award (2018)
- Victims of Communism Memorial Foundation's Dissident Human Rights Award (2019)
