= Lộc Hà district =

Lộc Hà District Huyện Lộc Hà
- District
- Interactive map of Lộc Hà District
- Country: Vietnam
- Region: North Central Coast
- Province: Hà Tĩnh
- Capital: Thạch Bằng
- Time zone: UTC+07:00 (Indochina Time)

Lộc Hà is a rural district of Hà Tĩnh province in the North Central Coast region of Vietnam.

== Notable residents ==
- Trần Thị Xuân: human rights activist.
