= Constitution of Vietnam =

Supreme law of Vietnam

Constitution of the Socialist Republic of Vietnam
- The 2013 Constitution, featuring 2025 amendments

Overview
- Original title: Hiến pháp nước Cộng hòa Xã hội chủ nghĩa Việt Nam
- Jurisdiction: Vietnam
- Ratified: November 28, 2013
- Date effective: January 1, 2014
- System: Unitary communist state

Government structure
- Branches: One (Note: All three branches: Legisature, Executive, and Judiciary are accountable to the National Assembly, the nation's supreme organ of state power.)
- Head of state: President of Vietnam
- Chambers: National Assembly (unicameral)
- Executive: Prime Minister
- Judiciary: Supreme People's Court
- Federalism: No
- Electoral college: No

History
- First legislature: 13th National Assembly
- Amendments: 1
- Last amended: June 16, 2025
- Citation: Constitution no. 52/VBHN-VPQH (PDF), July 21, 2025
- Signatories: Nguyễn Sinh Hùng (2013 edition); Lê Quang Tùng (2025 amendment)
- Media type: PDF
- Supersedes: 1992 Constitution of the Socialist Republic of Vietnam

Full text
- Constitution of Vietnam (2013) at Wikisource

The Constitution of the Socialist Republic of Vietnam (Vietnamese: Hiến pháp nước Cộng hòa xã hội chủ nghĩa Việt Nam) is the communist state constitution of Vietnam. It functions as the fundamental and supreme law of the state. The current constitution, commonly known as the 2013 Constitution (Hiến pháp năm 2013), was adopted on November 28, 2013, by the 13th National Assembly of Vietnam and took effect on January 1, 2014, being the third constitution adopted by the Vietnamese state since the political reunification of the country in 1976. It was amended in 2025.

== Current constitution ==
The current constitution, known as the 2013 Constitution, contains a preamble and 11 chapters:

- Chapter I: Political System
- Chapter II: Human Rights, Basic Civil Rights and Civic Duties
- Chapter III: The Economy, Society, Culture, Education, Science, Technology, and the Environment
- Chapter IV: Defence of the Homeland
- Chapter V: The National Assembly
- Chapter VI: President of the Republic
- Chapter VII: The Government
- Chapter VIII: The People's Court and the People's Procuracy
- Chapter IX: Local Government
- Chapter X: The National Electoral Council and the State Audit Office
- Chapter XI: The Effect of the Constitution and Amending the Constitution

== Previous constitutions ==
The Democratic Republic of Vietnam (DRV) had two constitutions:

- 1946 Constitution of the Democratic Republic of Vietnam, adopted on November 9, 1946.
- 1959 Constitution of the Democratic Republic of Vietnam, adopted on December 31, 1959.

The former Republic of Vietnam also had two constitutions, adopted in 1956 and 1967. Neither of these constitutional documents is in force, as the 1967 Constitution was abrogated when the government of the Republic of Vietnam collapsed in 1975.

Upon political reunification of the country in 1976, the 1960 Constitution of the Democratic Republic became the constitution of the Socialist Republic of Vietnam. Since then, the Vietnamese government adopted two constitutions before the 2013 Constitution:

- 1980 Constitution of the Socialist Republic of Vietnam, adopted on December 19, 1980.
- 1992 Constitution of the Socialist Republic of Vietnam, adopted on April 25, 1992, and amended in 2001.

=== 1946 Constitution ===
The 1946 constitution adopted a semi-presidential system similar to the French constitution; it allowed for multiple parties to participate in elections.

According to the 1946 constitution, the president of the republic, was the head of government, rather than a ceremonial head of state. The president also had significantly more power than the current office of president. The later 1959 constitution turned the president into a ceremonial head, while giving de facto power to the party leader.

Despite the changes in later constitution, the current Vietnamese government still heavily praises it, calling it "one of the world's most democratic constitution[s] at the time."

=== 1959 Constitution ===
While the 1946 constitution was a superficially liberal democratic document, its 1959 successor was a fully communist document. Its preamble defined the DRV as a "people's democratic state led by the working class", thus codifying the actual state of affairs that had prevailed since 1945. The document provided for a nominal separation of powers among legislative, executive, and judicial branches of government. On paper, the legislative function was carried out by the National Assembly. The assembly was empowered to make laws and to elect the chief officials of the state, such as the president (who was largely a symbolic head of state), the vice president, and cabinet ministers. Together those elected (including the president and vice president) formed a Council of Ministers, which constitutionally (but not in practice) was subject to supervision by the Standing Committee of the National Assembly. Headed by a prime minister, the council was the highest executive organ of state authority. Besides overseeing the Council of Ministers, the assembly's Standing Committee nominally supervised the Supreme People's Court, the chief organ of the judiciary. The assembly's executive side nominally decided on national economic plans, approved state budgets, and acted on questions of war or peace. In reality, however, the final authority on all matters rested with the Political Bureau.

=== 1980 Constitution ===
The 1959 document had been adopted during the tenure of Ho Chi Minh and demonstrated a certain independence from the Soviet model of state organization. The 1980 Constitution was drafted when Vietnam faced a serious threat from China, and political and economic dependence on the Soviet Union had increased. Perhaps, as a result, the completed document resembles the 1977 Soviet Constitution, which is evident in the principle of dictatorship of the proletariat, the exclusive leadership of the Communist Party, the centrally planned economy, the citizen's duties and statist rights, and the Leninist constitutional structure consisting of the supreme National Assembly, the collective presidency called the Council of State, the subordinate government called Council of Ministers, the procuracies, and the courts.

The reunification of North and South Vietnam (the former Republic of Vietnam) in 1976 provided the primary motivation for revising the 1959 constitution. Revisions were made along ideological lines set forth at the Fourth National Congress of the Vietnamese Communist Party (VCP) in 1976, emphasizing popular sovereignty and promising success in undertaking "revolutions" in production, science and technology, culture, and ideology. In keeping with the underlying theme of a new beginning associated with reunification, the constitution also stressed the need to develop a new political system, a new economy, a new culture, and a new socialist person.

The 1980 Vietnamese Constitution concentrates power in a newly established Council of State, much like the Presidium of the Supreme Soviet, endowing it nominally with both legislative and executive powers. Many functions of the legislature remain the same as under the 1959 document, but others have been transferred to the executive branch or assigned to both branches concurrently. The executive branch appears strengthened overall, having gained a second major executive body, the Council of State, and the importance of the National Assembly appears to have been reduced accordingly. The role of the Council of Ministers, while appearing on paper to have been subordinated to the new Council of State, in practice retained its former primacy.

Among the innovative features of the 1980 document is the concept of "collective mastery" of society, a frequently used expression attributed to the late party secretary Le Duan (1907 - 1986). The concept is a Vietnamese version of popular sovereignty, which advocates an active role for the people so that they may become their own masters as well as masters of society, nature, and the nation. It states that the people's collective mastery in all fields is assured by the state and is implemented by permitting the participation in state affairs of mass organizations. On paper, these organizations, to which almost all citizens belong, play an active role in government and have the right to introduce bills before the National Assembly.

Another feature is the concept of socialist legality, which dictates that "the state manage society according to law and constantly strengthen the socialist legal system." The concept, introduced at the Third National Party Congress in 1960, calls for achieving socialist legality through the state, its organizations, and its people. Law, in effect, is made subject to the decisions and directives of the party.

The 1980 Constitution comprises 147 articles, in 12 chapters, dealing with numerous subjects, including the basic rights and duties of citizens. Article 67 guarantees the citizens' rights to freedom of speech, the press, assembly, association, and the freedom to demonstrate. These rights, however, were subject to a caveat stating that, "no one may misuse democratic freedoms to violate the interests of the state and the people." In practice, the party and the government had considerable latitude to determine what was in "the interests of the state and the people."

=== 1992 Constitution ===
In light of the Đổi Mới market reforms adopted by Vietnam beginning on 18 December 1986 and the collapse of the Eastern Bloc, Vietnam adopted a new constitution in April 1992. The 1992 constitution adopted the socialist-oriented market economy, which allowed the development of private economic sectors, but it largely retained the previous constitutional structure.

The 1992 constitution established a right to healthcare for all citizens.

== See also ==
- Law enforcement in Vietnam
