= Nguyễn Văn Hoá =

Vietnamese citizen from Ha Tinh Province (born 1995)

- Born: 1995 (age 30–31); Hà Tĩnh
- Occupation: Videojournalist
- Known for: Journalism

Nguyễn Văn Hoá (born 1995) is a Vietnamese citizen from Ha Tinh Province. He was arrested and charged for "abusing democratic freedoms" under Article 258 of the Vietnamese Penal Code. His charges were later changed to "conducting propaganda against the state" under Article 88 of the Vietnamese Penal Code before being sentenced to seven years prison.

== Activism ==
Hoá has been active in assisting families affected by the 2016 Vietnam Marine Life Disaster, caused by the Formosa Ha Tinh Steel Plant in April 2016. He helped assist affected fishermen seek compensation and environmental justice.

A contributor with Radio Free Asia, Hoá submitted videos of protests in response to the disaster. He recorded videos of the environmental protests using a Flycam drone, and published them on various social media platforms.

== 2017 Arrest and Sentence ==
Nguyễn Văn Hoá was arrested in Ha Tinh on January 11, 2017. Hoá had his equipment including his mobile phone and camera seized whilst working on an assignment.

Hoá has been held incommunicado in Ha Tinh Province. His family were only notified of his temporary detention by authorities on January 23, 2017.

Hoá's arrest was a part of a series of arrests of several activists by Vietnamese authorities in days leading up to the Tet holiday. This included Nguyễn Văn Oai, a former prisoner of conscience, who was detained under Article 257 of the Vietnamese Penal Code.

Hoá was later sentenced to seven years prison in a one-day trial charged under Article 88 of the Vietnamese Penal Code for "conducting propaganda against the state".

== International Response ==
Committee to Protect Journalists's senior Southeast Asia representative Shawn Crispin stated that "Vietnam should stop treating journalists like criminals and Nguyễn Văn Hoá should be freed immediately, and without charge."

Brad Adams, Asia Director of Humans Rights Watch, condemned the arrest and stated that "Vietnam's international donors and trade partners should tell the government loud and clear that they will reassess their relationships if it keeps throwing peaceful critics in prison."

Hoá's case was also mentioned by Australian Members of Parliament including Chris Hayes who has "made a commitment to publicly condemn blatant violations of human rights" and Dr Anne Aly who called the arrests "extremely concerning and an act of harassment and intimidation."

To mark World Press Freedom Day, more than 25 international digital and human rights groups released a statement on May 3, 2017, regarding Nguyễn Văn Hoá's detention. The statement said: "With mounting social and environmental challenges, the government of Vietnam should welcome transparency and peaceful dialogue. Repressing citizen journalists is not only a violation of human rights but also a major impediment to Vietnam's aspirations to become a tech and innovation hub."

The European Union Parliament passed a motion for a resolution of freedom of expression in Vietnam, with a notable mention of the case of Nguyễn Văn Hoá in December 2017.

== See also ==
- 2016 Vietnam marine life disaster
- Human rights in Vietnam
- Nguyễn Văn Oai
- Trần Thị Nga
