= Đỗ Hoàng Điềm =

Do Diem
- Đỗ Hoàng Điềm
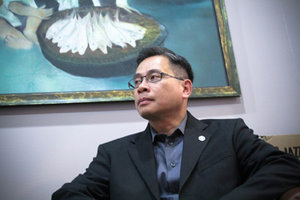
- Born: 1963 (age 62–63); Saigon, South Vietnam
- Occupation: Democracy activist
- Website: www.viettan.org

Do Hoang Diem (Đỗ Hoàng Điềm, also known as Diem Do) is the former chairman of the pro-democracy party Việt Tân. He is a prominent leader in the Vietnamese democracy movement.

== Early life and career ==
Do Hoang Diem attended the University of Houston to earn his MBA. After graduating business school in 1987, he worked as an executive in industries including banking, entertainment, health care and electronics.

Diem became very active in the Vietnamese American community. He served on the Vietnamese Professionals Society's first Board of Directors from 1991 to 1992, was a radio and TV talk show host for Little Saigon Broadcasting, and was also a member of the Executive Board of the Vietnamese Community of Southern California. Most notably, Diem testified numerous times in the United States Congress about human rights violations in Vietnam and US-Vietnam relations as a member of the Vietnamese Public Affairs Committee (VPAC), a grassroots organization aiming to empower Vietnamese Americans.

== International advocacy ==
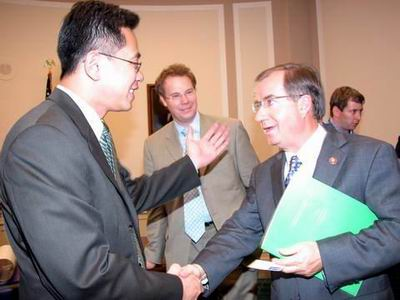
Do Hoang Diem and Congressman Edward Royce after a 2007 Congressional Human Rights Caucus hearing.

As chairman of Việt Tân, Do Hoang Diem meets with policymakers and non-governmental organizations in Canberra, Paris, Washington, D.C and other capitals.

Speaking before the Congressional Human Rights Caucus on May 10, 2007, Diem stated: "It is no longer the question of if democracy will triumph in Vietnam, but when." In his testimony, he recommended Congress to pressure the Vietnamese government to stop jamming Radio Free Asia broadcasts.

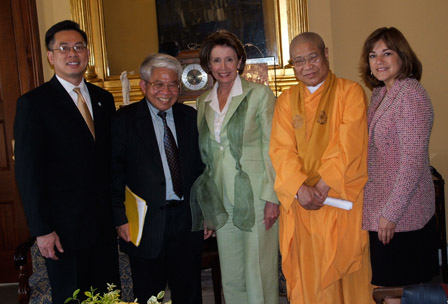
From the left: Do Hoang Diem, Nguyen Ngoc Bich of the National Congress of Vietnamese Americans, House Speaker Nancy Pelosi, prominent Buddhist leader Thich Giac Duc, and Congresswoman Loretta Sanchez.

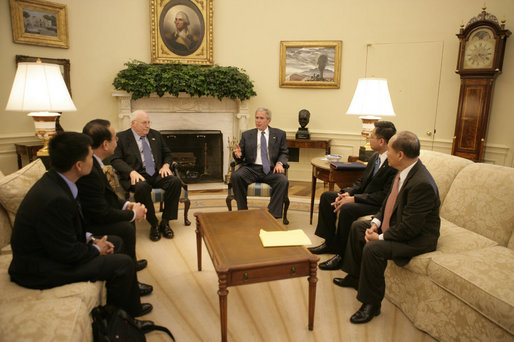
Việt Tân chairman Do Hoang Diem (2nd from right) meets with U.S. President George Bush and Vice President Dick Cheney on May 29, 2007 urging the president to increase pressure on Vietnam to respect human rights

On May 29, 2007, chairman Do Hoang Diem was invited by US president George W. Bush together with three other Vietnamese-American activists to the White House on a meeting about Vietnam's increasingly harsh treatment of anti-government activists and an upcoming visit by Vietnam's president Nguyen Minh Triet to the United States. During the 45-minute meeting, Do Hoang Diem urged the president to increase pressure on Vietnam to respect human rights and asked for the United States to support openly democratic forces to bring change to Hanoi. During Nguyen Minh Triet's visit to the US, Do Hoang Diem also met with House Speaker Nancy Pelosi shortly before her meeting with the Vietnamese president to stress the importance of raising the issue of Vietnam's poor human rights record.

On March 12, 2008, he appeared before the U.S. Senate Foreign Relations Committee's subcommittee on East Asian and Pacific Affairs to encourage lawmakers to call for the release of imprisoned activists in Vietnam including several Việt Tân members. He told the Senate panel: "After more than 50 years in power, for the first time, the Vietnamese Communist Party is facing numerous and unprecedented challenges to its rule. The desire for real changes in Vietnam is stronger now than ever before. In response, the regime is using terror tactics to silence opposition, and severely violate human rights of not just political dissidents but also bloggers, farmers, workers, students or whoever dares to question the regime's authority."

On March 19, 2009, Diem testified before the Human Rights Sub-Committee of the Australian Parliament. He addressed the issues of arbitrary arrest and detention, freedom of expression, religious freedom and workers rights.

He is a frequent speaker at public events. His op-ed articles on Vietnam have been published in the Wall Street Journal and Asia Times.

During 2013 Conviction of 14 Vietnamese Dissidents, he also appeared on public media including Saigon Broadcasting Television Network as well as Al Jazeera to speak out against this "blatant crackdown."

== Việt Tân membership ==
Diem joined Việt Tân in 1982 while he was still in college. Diem eventually quit as a senior health care executive to work full-time in Việt Tân.

After having been a member for almost ten years, he became the Southern Californian Regional Director from 1991 to 1995, afterwards he became the External Affairs Director from 1996 to 2004, and briefly held the position of Policy Director in 2005-2006. In September 2006 at the 6th Party Congress, he was elected as the chairman of Việt Tân, replacing the previous chairman, Nguyen Kim. In September 2022, the 9th Party Congress elected Mr. Ly Thai Hung as the new chairman of Việt Tân. Do Hoang Diem is still a member of Viet Tan's central committee.

== See also ==
- Việt Tân
- Hoang Tu Duy
- Nguyen Quoc Quan
