= Human rights in Vietnam =

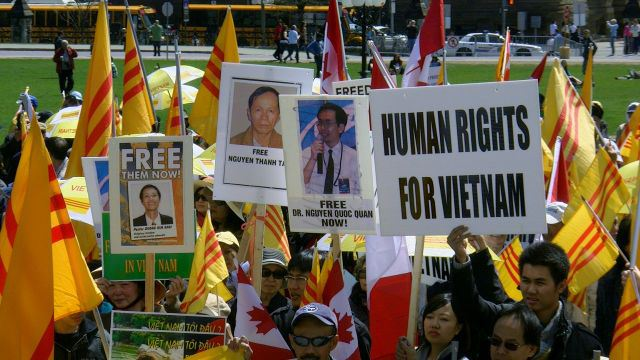
A rally demanding for the release of Nguyễn Quốc Quân on 30 April 2012, during "Black April"

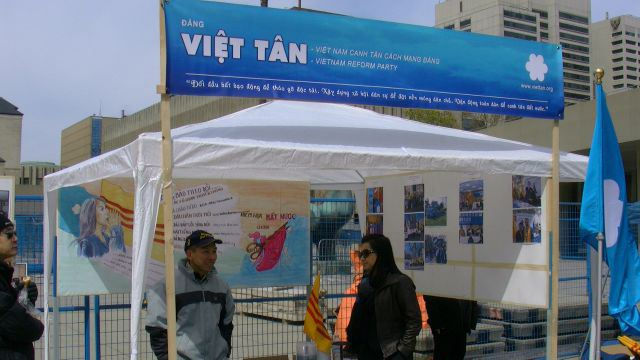
Việt Tân Party info booth at a pro-democracy, pro-human rights rally

Human rights in Vietnam (Vietnamese: Nhân quyền tại Việt Nam) are among the poorest in the world, as considered by various domestic and international academics, dissidents and non-governmental organizations (NGOs) such as Amnesty International (AI), Human Rights Watch (HRW), and the United Nations High Commissioner for Human Rights (OHCHR).

This has long been a matter of controversy between the Government of Vietnam, led by its Communist Party (CPV), and other countries and political unions, such as the European Union (EU) and the United States. Under the current constitution, the CPV is the only legal political party: all other parties are outlawed, making Vietnam one of a few legally constituted one-party states, along with China, Cuba, Eritrea, Laos, and North Korea.

Elections in Vietnam have been characterized as nothing more than a rubber stamp, with every election resulting in 99% of votes for the CPV. Freedom of association, freedom of speech, freedom of the press, and the right to a healthy environment are severely restricted. Citizens critical of the Vietnamese government or who discuss certain topics deemed "unacceptable" by the CPV are often subject to intimidation and imprisonment.

The Vietnamese government has also made use of online operatives and nationalist netizens or "public opinion brigades", state-sponsored anonymous political commentators and trolls who combat any perceived dissent against CPV policies or protest over the status of human rights. A Vietnam Human Rights Day is observed each year on 11 May in the U.S. state of Virginia, particularly by the Vietnamese diaspora who left after the Vietnam War and the Fall of Saigon (Note: Also known as the "Liberation of Saigon" by the regime.) as well as by dissidents who fled the country in subsequent decades.

== Rights ==
=== Environmental rights ===
De jure, the article 43 of the constitution of Vietnam includes a right to a healthy environment. The state is obliged to "…protect the environment; manage, and effectively and stably use natural resources; protect nature and biodiversity; take initiative in prevention and resistance against natural calamities; and respond to climate change." These rights were further advanced through the Law on Environmental Protection in 2014.

=== Freedom of religion ===
While the Constitution of Vietnam officially provides for freedom of religion, in practice the government imposes a range of legislative measures restricting religious practice (such as registration requirements, control boards, and surveillance). All religious groups must register and seek approval from the government. The government requires all Buddhist monks to be approved by and work under the officially recognized Buddhist organization, the Vietnam Buddhist Sangha (VBS). The number of Buddhist student monks is controlled and limited by the Committee on Religious Affairs. According to a 2020 report by Human Rights Watch, prohibited religious activities are those deemed to be contrary to arbitrary notions of the "national interest", "public order", or "national unity". Unrecognized religious groups, including Cao Đài, Hòa Hảo, and some Christian and Buddhist groups face "constant surveillance and harassment". Some religious groups may be subject to "public criticism, forced renunciation of faith, detention, interrogation, torture, and imprisonment." Laws continue to be applied unevenly however, with some local government areas taking a more relaxed and tolerant approach than others.

In 2023, the country was scored 1 out of 4 for religious freedom by the American organization Freedom House. In the same year it was ranked as the 25th most difficult place in the world to be a Christian by Christian mission Open Doors.

== Rights of specific groups ==
=== LGBT rights ===
Lesbian, gay, bisexual, and transgender (LGBT) rights in Vietnam have expanded in the 21st century; however, LGBTQ+ people still face legal challenges not experienced by non-LGBTQ residents.

Both female and male forms of same-sex sexual activity between consenting adults are legal and never have been criminalized in Vietnamese history. However, same-sex couples and households headed by same-sex couples are ineligible for the legal protections available to heterosexual couples. Vietnam provides limited anti-discrimination protections for transgender people. (Note: Article 4, Decree 01/VBHN-BYT prohibits discrimination against people who has undergone sex reassignment. Article 35, Decree 176/2013/NĐ-CP establishes monetary fine of 2,000,000 to 5,000,000 Vietnamese dong for those engaging in discriminatory acts against transgender people, while Article 155 of the 2015 Penal Code specified a sentence of probation up to 3 years for repeated violation.) The right to change gender was officially legalized in Vietnam after the National Assembly passed an amendment to the Civil Code in 2015.

The Vietnamese Penal Code indicates that the age of consent is 16 years, regardless of gender or sexual orientation.

Vietnam's first annual gay pride parade took place in Hanoi on 5 August 2012. In 2017, pride parades were held in around 34 other cities and provinces.

=== Ethnic minorities ===
According to the Vietnamese constitution: "All the ethnicities are equal, unified and respect and assist one another for mutual development; all acts of national discrimination and division are strictly forbidden."

The Cham, Montagnard and Khmer Krom minorities joined together in the United Front for the Liberation of Oppressed Races (FULRO), to wage war against the Vietnamese for independence during the Vietnam War. The last remaining FULRO insurgents surrendered to the United Nations in 1992.

Various ethnic minority organizations like the Montagnard Foundation, Inc., International Office of Champa, and Khmers Kampuchea-Krom Federation allege that the Vietnamese people and government perpetuate human rights abuses against the Degar (Montagnards), Cham, and Khmer Krom. Vietnam has settled over a million ethnic Vietnamese on Montagnard lands in the Central Highlands. The Montagnard staged a massive protest against the Vietnamese in 2001, which led the Vietnamese to forcefully crush the uprising and seal the entire area off to foreigners.

=== Repression of Chams ===
The Cham in Vietnam are only recognized as a minority, and not as an indigenous people by the Vietnamese government despite being indigenous to the region. Both Hindu and Muslim Chams have experienced religious and ethnic persecution and restrictions on their faith under the current Vietnamese government, with the Vietnamese state confiscating Cham property and forbidding Cham from observing their religious beliefs. Hindu temples were turned into tourist sites against the wishes of the Cham Hindus. In 2010 and 2013, several incidents occurred in the villages of Thành Tín and Phươc Nhơn, where Cham were murdered by Vietnamese. Cham Muslims in the Mekong Delta have also been economically marginalized and pushed into poverty by Vietnamese government policies, with ethnic Vietnamese Kinh settling on majority Cham lands with state support, and the religious practices of minorities have been targeted for elimination by the Vietnamese government.

In 2012, Vietnamese police in Chau Giang village stormed into a Cham Mosque, stole the electric generator, and also raped Cham girls.

The Vietnamese government fears that evidence of Champa's influence over the disputed area in the South China Sea would bring attention to human rights violations and killings of ethnic minorities in Vietnam such as those which were committed in the 2001 and 2004 uprisings, and lead to the issue of Cham autonomy being brought into the dispute, since the Vietnamese conquered Cham people in a war in 1832, as well as the Vietnamese continuing to destroy evidence of Cham culture and artifacts left behind, plundering or building on top of Cham temples, building farms over them, banning Cham religious practices, and omitting references to the destroyed Cham capital of Song Luy in the 1832 invasion in history books and tourist guides. The situation of the Cham compared to that of ethnic Vietnamese is substandard, with the Cham lacking water and electricity and living in houses made out of mud.

== Reporting ==
=== Vietnamese UNHRC report ===
A report drafted by the Vietnamese government on 18 June 2007 for the United Nations Human Rights Council to review the implementation of human rights in the territory of Viet Nam stated: For Viet Nam, the people are both the ultimate objective and driving force of any social and economic development policy, and protecting and promoting human rights are always the Government's consistent policy. The 1992 Constitution, the supreme law of the country, guarantees that all citizens enjoy equal political, economic, cultural and social rights, and are equal before the law. Every citizen has the right to participate in the management of the State and the society, the freedoms of religion and belief, the right to free movement and residence in the territory of Viet Nam, the right to complaints and petitions, the right to employment, education and healthcare etc. regardless of gender, race and religion. On that basis, Vietnamese laws enumerate the specific rights in accordance with international human rights standards.

According to the Vietnamese embassy, the UN ratified Vietnam's human rights report. The embassy also stated that many of these countries appreciated Vietnam's renewal, achievements and strong commitment to fostering human rights.

According to a 1997 report by the China Internet Information Center, Vietnam has made a number of changes to its constitution, laws, and practical policies in the area of human rights since the Đổi Mới, or the economic reform in 1986. For instance, the Constitution was amended in 1991 to enshrine the protection of "political, civil, economic, cultural and cultural rights" for the first time, and the penal code explicitly banned torture. Internationally, Vietnam was the second signatory of the Convention on the Rights of the Child. Although Vietnam retains capital punishment, the Constitution of 1992 reduced the number of eligible crimes from 44 to 29, and over 90% of the population has access to health care. In women's rights, Vietnam ranks 2nd among Asia-Pacific countries and 9th among 135 countries in percentage of female parliamentarians.

=== Reports regarding human rights in Vietnam ===
Recent US reports maintain the same observations and international human rights organizations that share these views include Human Rights Watch and the Unrepresented Nations and Peoples Organization. The United Nations has highlighted religious persecution.

In 2009, the European Parliament expressed concern about "the growing climate of intolerance in Vietnam towards human rights defenders and members of officially unrecognized religious communities." It called on the government to end repression against freedom of expression, belief, and assembly, and to release its "political prisoners".

Freedom of expression remains a problem as the Vietnamese authorities continue to use tough national security laws to punish critics of the Vietnamese government. According to the British government's Foreign, Commonwealth and Development Office, official media remained tightly controlled by government censorship and obstruction.

As of 2017, Vietnam held over 100 political prisoners for the crime of criticizing the government or participating in religions, protests, activism, or political parties not sanctioned by the government.

According to Human Rights Watch, the government of Vietnam has increased its crackdown on dissidents, human rights activists and independent journalists, ahead of the 13th party congress of the Communist Party of Vietnam that took place in January 2021. The court has also increased the prison time for dissidents serving detention.

On 23 December 2021, Office of the United Nations High Commissioner for Human Rights (OHCHR) condemned the conviction and long-term sentencing of four prominent human rights defenders and journalists in Vietnam. The sentences against Do Nam Truong, Trinh Ba Phoung, Nguyen Thi Tam and Pham Doan Trang stemmed from their continuous advocacy and reporting on human rights in Viet Nam.

== Arrests of dissidents in the twenty-first century ==
=== 2000s ===
In 2009, Lê Công Định, a lawyer who several years previously had acted for the government in a successful case against American catfish farmers, was arrested and charged with the capital crime of subversion; several of his associates were also arrested. Many Western governments condemned the move, and human rights groups alleged that the arrest was due to Le Cong Dinhs' support for freedom of speech. Amnesty International named him and his arrested associates prisoners of conscience.

=== 2010s ===
As of 2011, Vietnam holds several other individuals in detention whom Amnesty International considers to be prisoners of conscience: Cù Huy Hà Vũ, convicted of "conducting propaganda against the state" for giving interviews to foreign press; Nguyễn Đan Quế, convicted of "red-handed keeping and distributing documents" calling for the overthrow of the government; and Roman Catholic priest Thadeus Nguyễn Văn Lý (also known as Father Thaddeus) detained for "spreading propaganda against the state."

In January 2019, the authorities of Vietnam arrested and sentenced an Australian democracy activist, Chau Van Kham, to 12 years of imprisonment on charges of "financing terrorism". The 70-year-old was arrested over his membership of pro-democracy group Việt Tân. The charges against him were claimed to be baseless and politically motivated by human rights advocates, lawyers and his family. In June 2023, after serving four years in prison, The Guardian reported that the activist was released from imprisonment on humanitarian grounds, with the efforts of the Australian government.

=== 2020s ===
Dozens were arrested and tried in 2021.

In May 2023, activist Trần Văn Bang was sentenced to eight years in prison after making Facebook posts critical of the government.

In January 2026, activist Hoàng Thị Hồng Thái was sentenced to prison after making Facebook posts critical of the government.

== See also ==
- Vietnam Human Rights Network – founded by Vietnamese dissidents
