= Võ Tuấn Nhân =

Vietnamese politician

Võ Tuấn Nhân (born 6 March 1963, age 63) is a Vietnamese politician. He used to be a member of the National Assembly of the 13th term of the term 2011–2016, belonging to the National Assembly delegation of Quang Ngai province and currently serves as Deputy Minister of Natural Resources and Environment.

He was born in Tiên Mỹ commune, Tiên Phước District, Quang Nam province. He currently resides in Nghĩa Chánh Ward, Quảng Ngãi, Quảng Ngãi Province.

== Career ==
Vo joined the Communist Party of Vietnam on October 20, 1988. He was a member of the provincial People's Council (1999-2004). He was also a member of the 12th National Assembly. On May 22, 2011, he was elected a member of the National Assembly of Vietnam for Quang Ngai province.

He is a member of the Provincial Party Committee, Deputy Head of the delegation in charge of the delegation of Quang Ngai Provincial Party XII and Deputy Minister of Natural Resources and Environment.
