= Hanoi Pride =

LGBTQ event in Hanoi, Vietnam

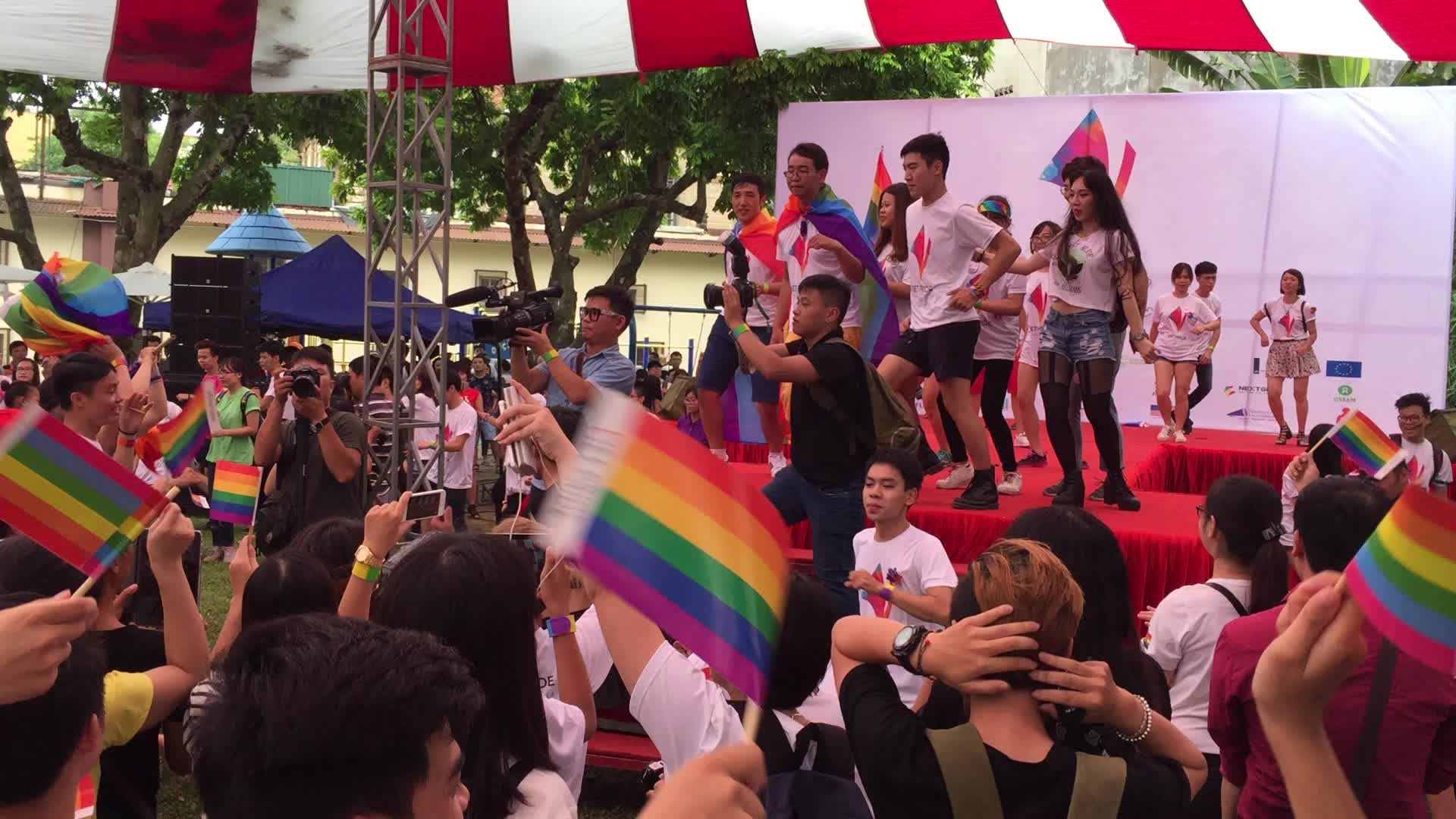
- Hanoi Pride, 2016
- Inaugurated: 5 August 2012
- Most recent: 22 September 2024

Hanoi Pride is an annual series of events which celebrates lesbian, gay, bisexual, transgender, queer (LGBTQ+) life in Hanoi, Vietnam.

The first pride in Hanoi was celebrated in 2012, and has been celebrated annually since. In 2015, openly gay United States Ambassador to Vietnam Ted Osius attended the event. In 2020 and 2021, the event was held online due to the COVID-19 pandemic. In-person celebrations resumed in 2022.
