= Cấn Thị Thêu =

- Born: 1962 (age 63–64)

Cấn Thị Thêu (born 1962) is a Vietnamese human rights activist. After moving to Dương Nội, a village outside of Hanoi, after marrying a local farmer, Thêu became known for her work in documenting land seizures and mobilization for the returns of lands and fair compensation from local authorities. On 20 September 2016 she was sentenced to 20 months imprisonment by The People's Court of Đống Đa District in Hanoi on charges of “Disturbance public order”. Thêu is considered a "prisoner of conscience" by human rights groups.

== Background ==
In Vietnam, land is considered people's property have usage rights, but the government is the administrator of its usage. In late 2007, local authorities seized the family farm of Thêu without adequate compensation. Thêu, her husband and two sons are one of more than 350 families in Dương Nội alone who have been taking their case to local authorities to petition for redress. Thêu has been active in campaigning against and documenting land confiscations in Hanoi and surrounding provinces. She is calling for adequate compensation for land seizures in Vietnam, supporting others defend their land and calling attention to government expropriation of land at unfair prices. In 2020 she was arrested with a criminal charge.

== Prior arrests ==
Her first arrest was in April 2014 for recording video of land confiscations in Hà Đông district in Hanoi and police attacking protestors with sticks and batons. She was charged with “Resisting a law enforcement officer in performance of his/her official duties” under Article 257 of the Penal Code during the course of her arrest. In September of that year Thêu and her husband, Trinh Ba Tu, were sentenced to 15 months in prison. After her release in July 2015 she continued to engage in peaceful demonstrations against land seizures by the local authorities.

In January 2016 Thêu was briefly detained in Hanoi for protesting against attempts by the local authorities to confiscate family farms. Thêu and about 100 people in the central city were broken up when about 200 to 300 police surrounded the demonstrators near 34 Ly Thai To street and herded a group of them onto a bus to the police station.

== 2016 arrest ==
On 10 June 2016 several dozen police officers arrived at Thêu's family home in Hoa Binh province in the north of Vietnam to search her house, confiscate her mobile phone and arrest her. Thêu is detained under Article 245 of Vietnam's Penal Code on a charge of “causing public order” as she had allegedly been involved in disturbances of the Đống Đa district in Hanoi. In fact, she and other land petitioners attended a "peaceful demonstration" to demand the return of their land which was seized by authorities.

Her sons, Trinh Ba Tu and Trịnh Bá Phương, and many other land petitioners held a peaceful demonstration in Hà Đông district to call for her immediate release. But prior to that, they had been using social media to spread their own conspiracy about how the government works. As a consequence, police confiscated their cameras and cell phones and erased all data including pictures and videos during their 10-hour detention on 13 June 2016. Following this, the organization who backed them did take this seriously.

Thêu can be held in custody for up to four months while the police investigate her case. If she is found guilty, she could face imprisonment of up to seven years. Thêu is facing charges that reportedly relate to her role in organizing a peaceful demonstration on 8 April 2016 honoring the tenth anniversary of a pro-democracy group and urging the release of detained human rights lawyer Nguyễn Văn Đài, but also using social media to spread conspiracy.

Her lawyer is Ha Huy Son, who has submitted paperwork to be Dai's defense lawyer but was declined by the Ministry of Public Security. Son had his first meeting with Thêu on 22 June 2016 and advised her to stop the hunger strike that she started on the first day of her arrest.

On 20 September 2016 Thêu was sentenced to 20 months imprisonment by The People's Court of Đống Đa district in Hanoi on charges of “Disturbance public order” under Article 245 of the Penal Code. Thêu appealed against the sentence, citing an unfair trial that failed to meet international standards for justice, but the Hanoi's People's Court upheld her conviction on 30 November 2016.

== 2020 arrest ==
On 24 June 2020, after a long time of spreading conspiracies and hiding their location from the public. Thêu was located due to the fact that Facebook had let the authority access to all data in Vietnam. She was arrested with charge "Making, storing, using, spreading informations, items against the Socialist Republic of Vietnam" - Penal Code 117. At the time, she was hiding with her son Trịnh Bá Tư in Hoà Bình. At her house, police uncovered many items, recordings, 10 CD, DVD discs and USB devices contain informations against the Socialist Republic of Vietnam, together with 3 smartphones that were used to manage their social media accounts.

In July 2026, Thêu's finally published concerns that prison officials were not providing her medical treatment for abdominal pain and fever.

== International response ==
The recent detention of Thêu is condemned by various organizations and individuals worldwide.

On 12 August 2016, Ian Britza, Member of Western Australian Parliament representing Morley, called for the release of Thêu by writing a letter to the Prime Minister of Socialist Republic of Vietnam, Nguyễn Xuân Phúc. Ian expresses his concerns about Thêu's current health and well being as she conducted a 13-day hunger strike. In his letter Ian also points out that Vietnam has signed the Universal Declaration of Human Rights and the International Covenant on Civil and Political Rights and should commit to them.

In addition, human rights organization Front Line Defenders has encouraged people to take action for Thêu by signing a letter to Phạm Bình Minh, the Minister of Foreign Affairs of Vietnam. The letter contains three actions that the Vietnamese government should immediately undertake. First, Thêu and Dai need to be released urgently and unconditionally and all charges need to be dropped against them. Second, all necessary measures need to be taken to guarantee the physical and psychological integrity and security of Thêu and her family. Finally, human rights defenders in Vietnam need to be able to carry out their legitimate human right activities.

== See also ==
Human rights in Vietnam
