= Judicial system of Vietnam =

National court system of Vietnam

The judicial system of Vietnam is governed under the Constitution of Vietnam, the Law on the Organization of People's Courts (2014), and the Law on the Organization of People's Procuracies (2014). The judiciary falls under the leadership of the Communist Party of Vietnam. The judiciary is nominally accountable to the National Assembly of Vietnam, which is the highest institution of government power in the country.

== Criticisms ==
While the constitution provides for independent judges and lay assessors (who lack administrative training), the U.S. Department of State maintains that Vietnam lacks an independent judiciary, in part because the Communist Party of Vietnam selects judges and vets them for political reliability. The party seeks to influence the outcome of cases involving perceived threats to the state or the party's dominant position.

In an effort to increase judicial independence, the government transferred local courts from the Ministry of Justice to the Supreme People's Court in September 2002. The Department of State saw no evidence that the move actually achieved the stated goal.

== Death penalty ==
As of June 2025, the death penalty can be applied to those found guilty of certain crimes. In January 2014, a court in northern Vietnam sentenced 30 Vietnamese citizens to death after they were found guilty of heroin trafficking—the largest number of defendants sentenced to death in a single trial in the country's legal history. At the same time, around 700 people are on death row in Vietnam. The January 2014 decision received condemnation from some international organizations, such as the World Coalition Against the Death Penalty. Ten and a half years later, Vietnam removed the death penalty for corruption, drug trafficking, and some other crimes.
