= Hoang Tu Duy =

Vietnamese-born American democracy activist

Duy Hoang
- Hoàng Tứ Duy
- Born: November 29, 1971 (age 54); Saigon, South Vietnam
- Occupations: Executive Director of Viet Tan, writer, democracy activist

Hoàng Tứ Duy (also known as Duy "Dan" Hoang) is a Vietnamese-born American democracy activist. He is currently the executive director for Viet Tan, an unsanctioned pro-democracy political movement in Vietnam. Before becoming a full-time democracy activist, he worked as an investment banker for over 10 years. He has testified before US Congressional committees on human rights issues and written for the Wall Street Journal, Asia Times Online and leading Vietnamese-language publications.

He currently lives in Washington, D.C.

== Early life and career ==
Born in Saigon, he left Vietnam in April 1975 at the age of three. He holds a B.A. from the University of California, Davis and an MBA from the University of Chicago.

He was a principal financial officer at the International Finance Corporation, the private-sector arm of the World Bank, where he was responsible for IFC's local currency financing programs in Asia and Eastern Europe. He was hired to head Deutsche Bank's investment banking activities in Vietnam in 2007. However, he was reportedly denied entry by government authorities.

He has a long history of organizing for the Vietnamese community, actively serving as board member and organizer.

He is a co-founder and former National Co-chair for the Vietnamese American National Gala (VANG), a national annual celebration of Vietnamese heritage and pride.

He is a co-founder of VOICE, a non-profit organization that focuses on advocacy for the protection of Vietnamese refugees, as well as addressing other issues confronting the conscience of our community.

He also served on the board of Vietnamese-American Public Affairs Committee, a grassroots organization aiming to empower Vietnamese Americans through civic engagement. As a VPAC member, he testified before the House Committee on Ways and Means about US-Vietnam trade relations.

== Pro-democracy activism ==
Duy quit his career as an investment banker to join Viet Tan full-time in 2007. He has been a member of the leadership since 2001, currently serving as the spokesperson.

He is active on raising awareness about the dangers of bauxite mining in the Central Highlands in Vietnam. He has testified before US Congressional committees on human rights issues, calling on the international community to support democratic reforms in Vietnam.

As the number of Internet users reached critical mass in Vietnam and the government ramps up its crackdown on bloggers and digital activists, Viet Tan launched the Internet Freedom Campaign, with Duy being an outspoken advocate for Vietnamese netizens to access the net. He testified before a Congressional Briefing on Internet Freedom in Vietnam and spoken to conferences on strategies to promote access.

== Publications ==
- May Vietnam Follow South Africa, Chicago Tribune, May 20, 1994.
- A Damaged Brand, Wall Street Journal, November 15, 2007.
- South China Seizure, Wall Street Journal, February 6, 2008.
- Uncomfortable anniversary in Vietnam, Asia Times Online, September 10, 2008.
- Mr. Obama, Set Vietnam Free, Wall Street Journal, January 30, 2009.
- Vietnam bauxite plan opens pit of concern, Asia Times Online, March 17, 2009.
- China rift opens in Vietnam, Asia Times Online, January 14, 2009.
- Vietnam teeters towards a currency crisis, Asia Times Online, September 22, 2009.
- Hanoi’s Problems Run Deeper Than The Dong, Wall Street Journal, February 11, 2010.
- A Rights Agenda for Vietnam, Wall Street Journal, July 20, 2010.
- A sinking ship in Vietnam, Asia Times Online, April 6, 2012.
- Vietnam to target social media, The Diplomat, April 25, 2012.
- Rights before weapons for Vietnam, Asia Times Online, August 20, 2014.

== See also ==
- Đỗ Hoàng Điềm
- Việt Tân
