= Phạm Chí Dũng =

Vietnamese journalist

Phạm Chí Dũng (born 1966) is a Vietnamese journalist, political activist, dissident and Doctor of Economics. He is the founder of the Independent Journalists Association of Vietnam and has been a member of the Ho Chi Minh City Writers' Association since 1986. In 2019, he was arrested and convicted to 15 years imprisonment for "making, storing, and spreading information, documents, and items for the purpose of opposing the State of the Socialist Republic of Vietnam" in 2021. He was sentenced with two others and described as the mastermind.

Pham Chi Dung was a member of the Communist Party of Vietnam before resigning in December 2013 and served as an officer at the Internal Security Department of Ho Chi Minh City until July 2012.

In the course of his activities, Dung has used different pseudonyms.
