= Lê Đình Lượng =

Vietnamese activist

- Born: December 10, 1965 (age 60)
- Occupation: Businessman
- Known for: Democracy activism, citizen journalism

Lê Đình Lượng is a Vietnamese blogger, activist and prominent member of the Catholic Church. A veteran of the 1983 during Sino-Vietnamese conflicts, 1979–1991, he was arrested in Vietnam on 24 July 2017 and charged for "activities attempting to overthrow the state" under Article 79 of 1999 Penal Code. Lượng was subsequently sentenced to 20 years prison and 5 years house arrest in a one-day trial in August 2018.

== Activism ==
Lượng is a citizen journalist for Good News for the Poor and Catholic Youth, reporting on the movement for environmental justice following the 2016 Vietnam marine life disaster. He campaigned for the rights of farmers to refuse to pay excessive educational and agricultural output fees imposed by local authorities. Lượng also worked on supporting detained human rights defenders and their families, advocating for the release of political prisoners and the end to intimidation and harassment of activists and their families. He was physically attacked by policemen in Lâm Đồng Province following a celebration to mark the release of human rights activist and journalist Tran Minh Nhat.

Lượng was arrested while on his way home after visiting the wife of Nguyễn Văn Oai, a human rights defender who has been imprisoned since January 2017. According to his wife, he has not been permitted family visitations despite multiple requests.

== 2018 Conviction ==
Le Dinh Lượng was sentenced to 20 years prison and 5 years house arrest on 16 August 2018 in a trial which lasted five hours. He was only able to meet with his lawyer in late July 2018, after being held incommunicado for a year.

The international community was quick to react following the verdict. Phil Robertson, Deputy Asia Director of Human Rights Watch said it was "absolutely outrageous" and that "speaking out and peacefully demonstrating should not be a crime". The United States Department of State expressed their concerns calling the charges "vague" and that the trend of lengthy prison sentences handed down on peaceful activists was "troubling". The European Union Delegation said Lượng's conviction was in "direct breach of (the Vietnamese government's) international obligations" and conventions including the International Covenant on Civil and Political Rights.

== See also ==
- 2016 Vietnam marine life disaster
- Human rights in Vietnam
