= Law enforcement in Vietnam =

Law enforcement in Vietnam is primarily administered by the Ministry of Public Security through the People’s Public Security Forces, a uniformed state body responsible for maintaining public order, enforcing the law, and protecting national security. The force also undertakes criminal investigations covering a wide range of offenses, including economic crimes and activities considered threats to state security. As part of the People’s Armed Forces, it combines conventional policing functions with intelligence and internal security responsibilities under the centralized authority of the one-party state that is the Communist Party of Vietnam (CPV).

Vietnam People's Public Security is a part of Vietnam People's Armed Forces, it includes two branches:

- Vietnam People's Police
- Vietnam People's Security Force

== Organizational structure ==
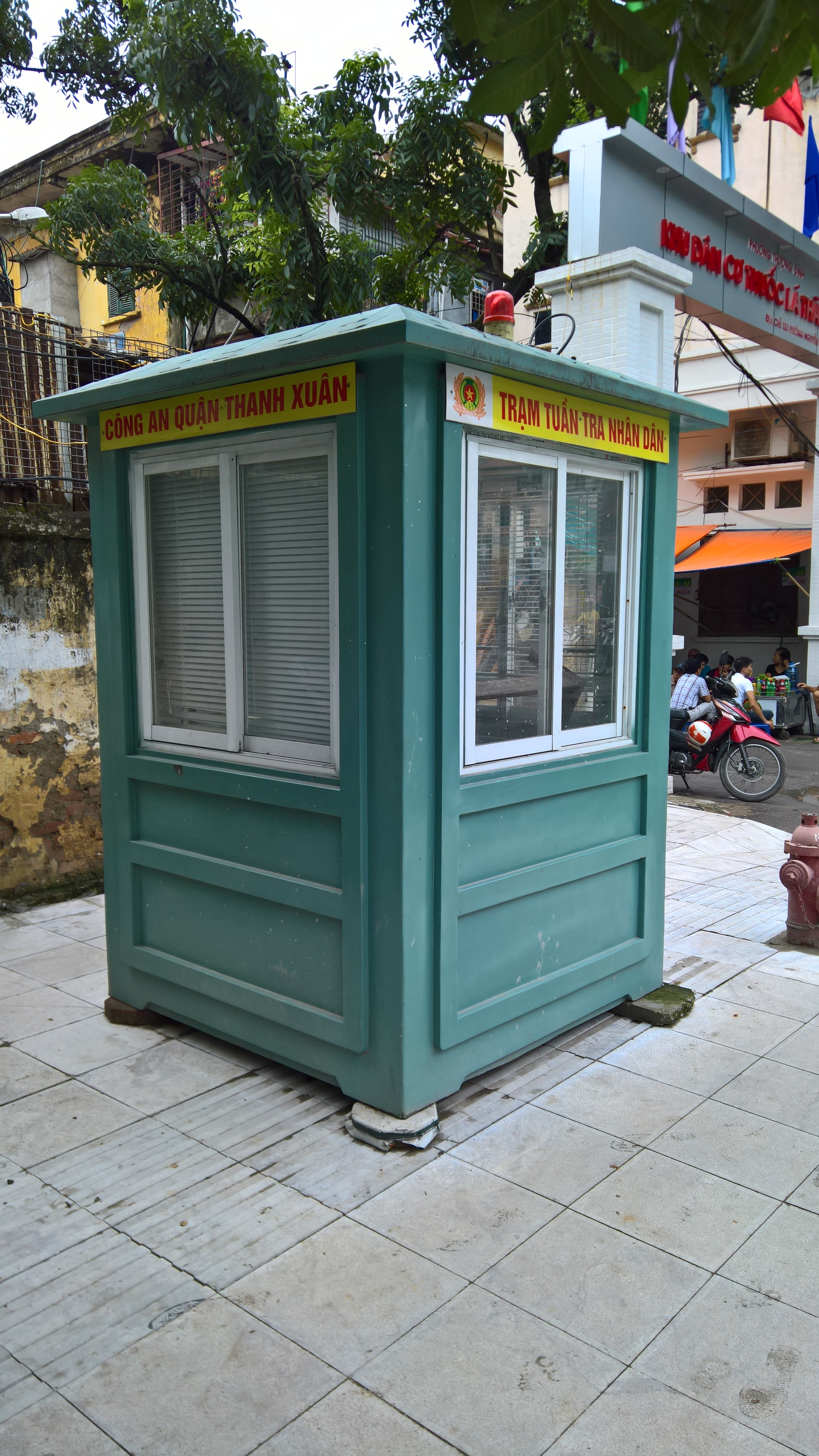
Thanh Xuân Police box.(2017)

=== National level ===
At the apex of the hierarchy is the Ministry of Public Security, a cabinet-level body responsible for:

- National policing policy
- Internal intelligence and counterintelligence
- Counterterrorism and counter-subversion
- Cybersecurity and information security
- Immigration and border control
- Criminal justice administration

The Ministry of Public Security is headed by a minister who reports to the national government and party leadership. Under the ministry are numerous general departments and specialized bureaus responsible for distinct operational domains, including economic crime, drug enforcement, technical surveillance, and public security intelligence.

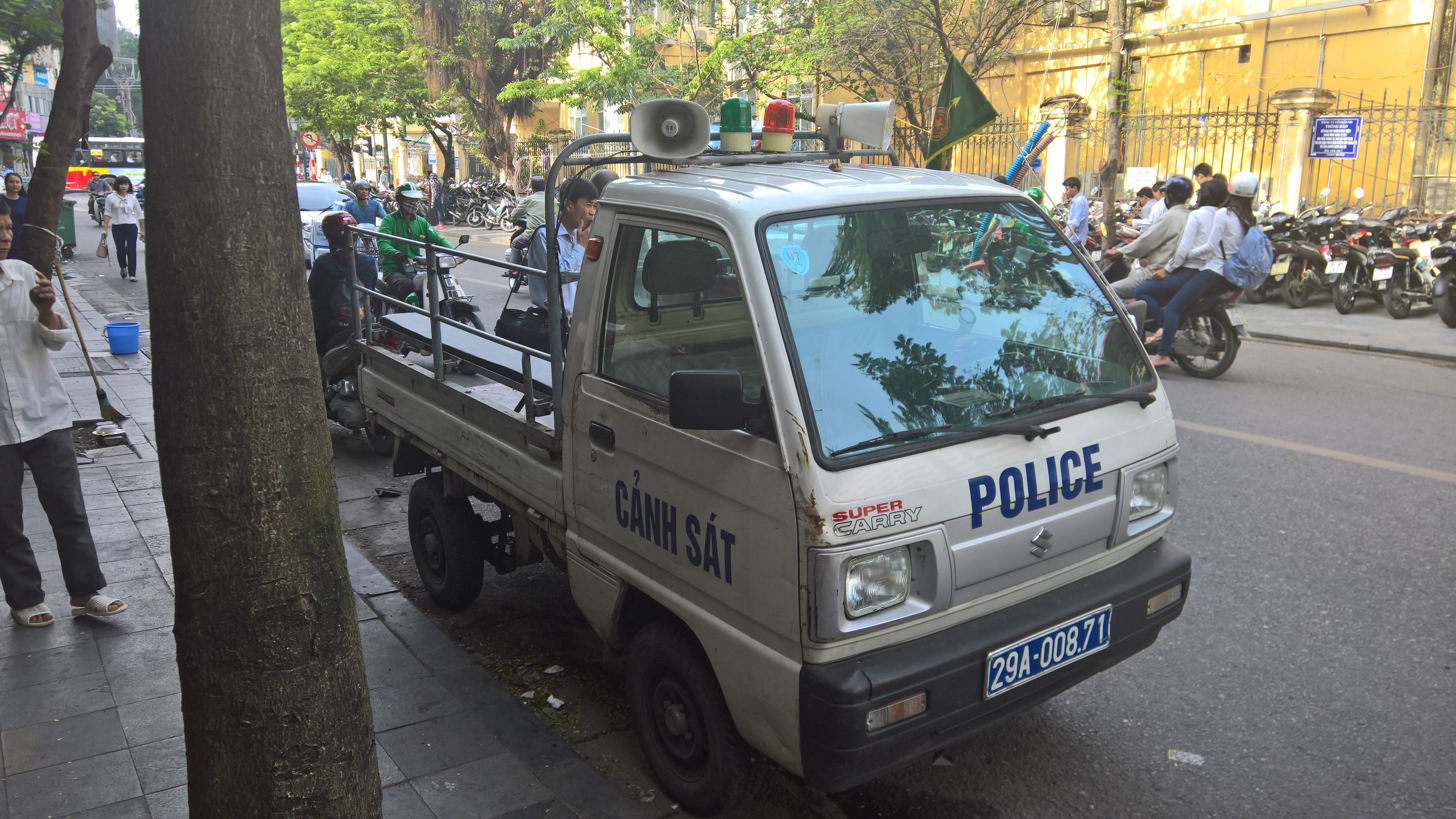
Local patrol police car in Hanoi.(2017)

=== Provincial and local levels ===
Below the national command structure are geographically organized police units:

1. 1 Provincial/Municipal Department of Public Security
- Administer policing within provinces and major cities
- Implement national directives
- Manage large investigations and detention facilities
1. 2 District Public Security Units
- Handle criminal investigations
- Conduct patrol and community policing
- Supervise custody and case processing
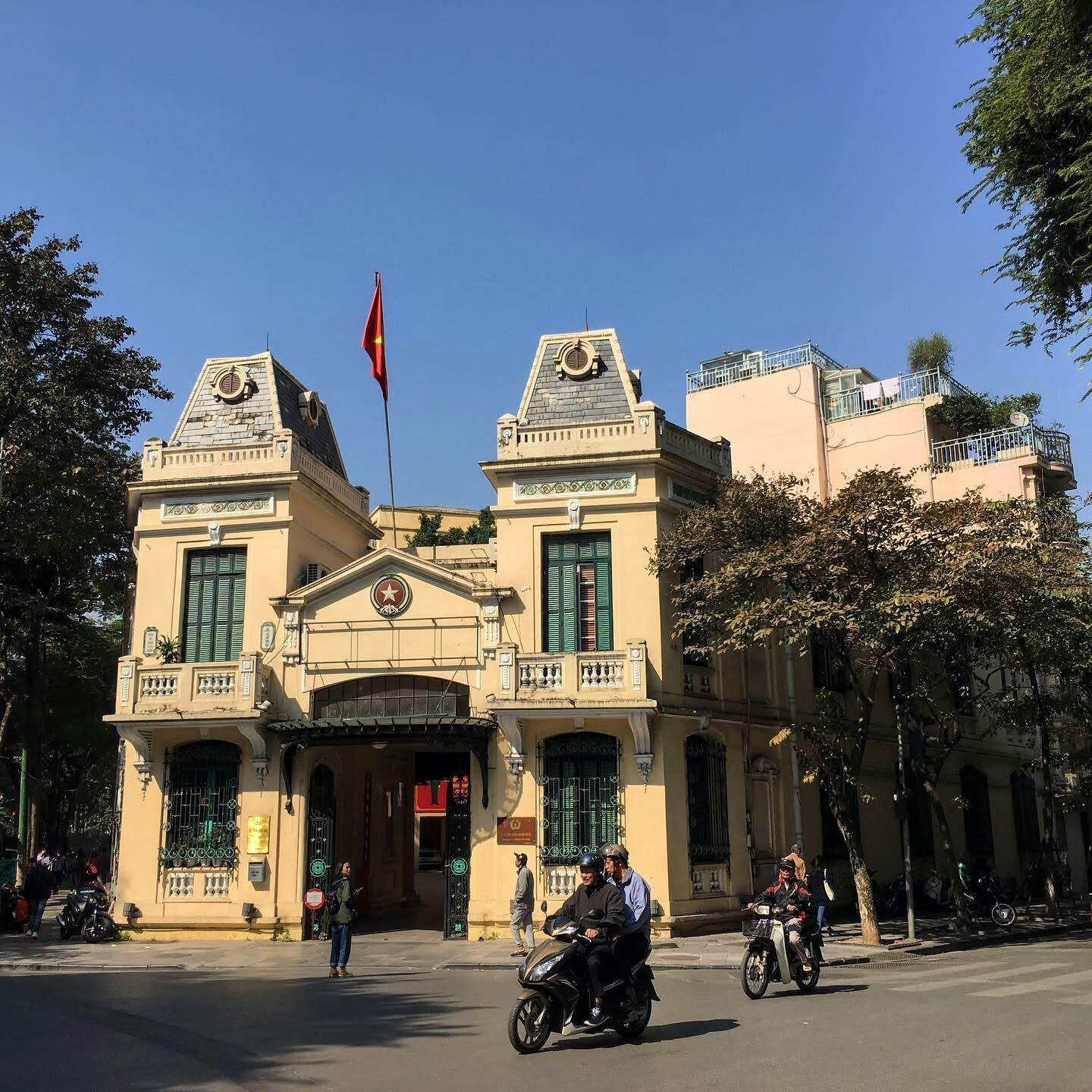
  Public Security station in Hoan Kiem, Hanoi.
1. 3 Commune/Ward Public Security Posts
- Grassroots security presence
- Household registration and residency management
- Local dispute mediation
- Public order monitoring

== Types of Police ==
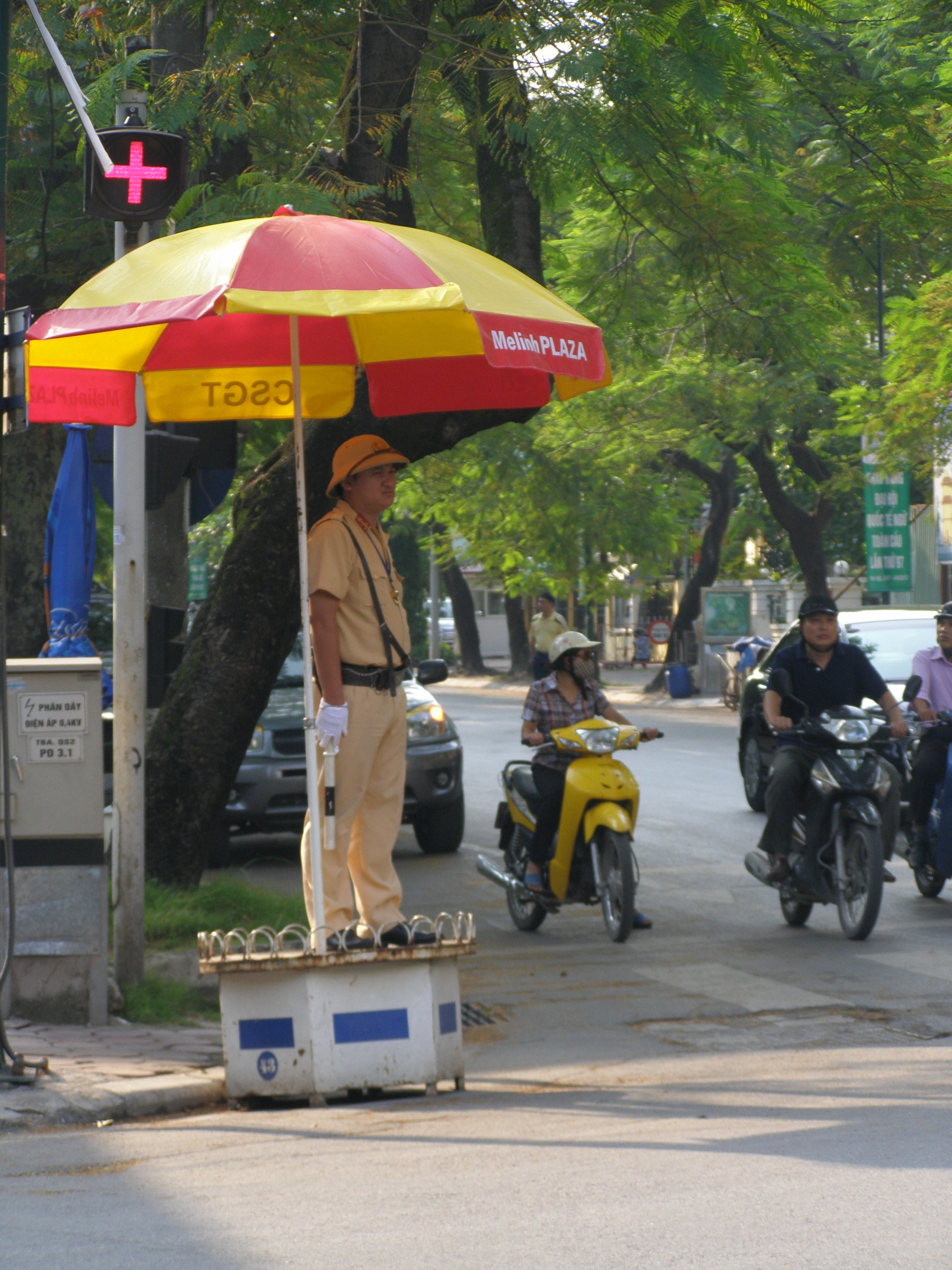
Traffic police officer in Hanoi (2018)

=== Traffic police ===
Traffic enforcement in Vietnam is carried out by the Traffic Police Department under the Ministry of Public Security. Traffic police units operate at national, provincial, and municipal levels, with responsibility for road safety enforcement, transport regulation, and vehicular crime prevention.

=== Mobile Police and Special Weapons and Tactics units ===
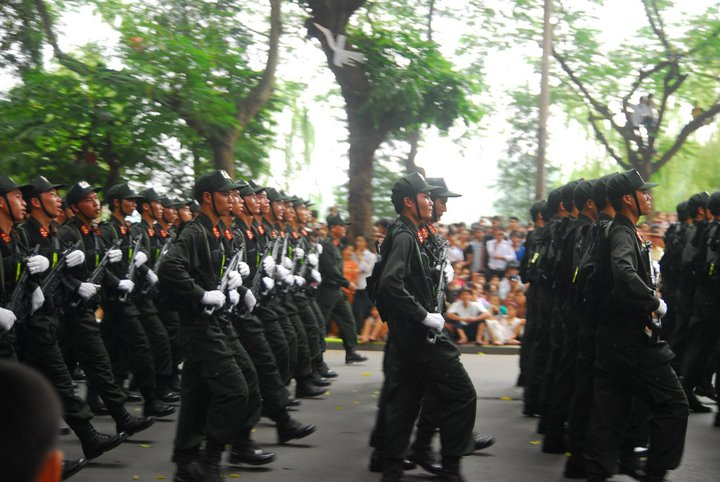
Mobile Police parading celebrating the Millennial Anniversary of Hanoi (2010)

Vietnam’s closest equivalent to SWAT forces operates under the Mobile Police Command, a rapid-response paramilitary branch of the People’s Public Security Forces. These units are trained and equipped for counterterrorism, riot suppression, hostage rescue, and high-risk armed operations.

The Mobile Police Command reports directly to the Ministry of Public Security and maintains regional regiments positioned for rapid deployment nationwide.

== Revolutionary foundations (1945–1954) ==
Vietnam’s contemporary law enforcement institutions emerged during the August Revolution of 1945, when revolutionary authorities established security organizations to defend the newly proclaimed Democratic Republic of Vietnam. Early public security units were tasked with counter-espionage, protection of revolutionary leaders, suppression of armed opposition groups, and maintenance of civil order in areas under revolutionary control.

Security personnel frequently operated in wartime environments. Their duties included identifying infiltrators, dismantling clandestine networks, securing supply routes, and enforcing administrative directives issued by revolutionary committees.

== Institutionalization in North Vietnam (1954–1975) ==
After the Geneva Accords divided Vietnam in 1954, North Vietnam formalized a centralized public security structure. The Ministry of Public Security developed specialized departments dedicated to political protection, economic regulation enforcement, border defense, and internal intelligence.

During the Vietnam War, public security forces conducted counterintelligence operations, protected strategic infrastructure, monitored population movements, and investigated suspected collaboration with foreign intelligence services. Security organs also managed wartime detention systems and ideological re-education programs.

== Post-reunification expansion (1975–1986) ==
Following national reunification in 1975, the Ministry of Public Security extended its authority across the entire country. Southern policing institutions were reorganized and integrated into the socialist security framework.

During this period, the ministry oversaw political vetting of former regime personnel, administration of re-education facilities, suppression of armed insurgent remnants, enforcement of centralized economic controls

Public security forces played a major role in consolidating state authority during the transition to unified governance.

== Reform era modernization (1986–present) ==
The Đổi Mới reforms initiated in 1986 transformed Vietnam’s economy and produced new law enforcement challenges. Market liberalization led to the growth of financial crime, smuggling networks, corruption cases, and cyber-enabled offenses.

In response, the Ministry of Public Security expanded professional training, established economic and cybercrime units, and strengthened international policing cooperation. Legal reforms clarified investigative procedures, detention regulations, and prosecutorial coordination.

== Weapons ==
The following is a list of firearms that the law enforcement in Vietnam uses:

Name	Origin	
APX	Italy	Used in 2012.
Steckin APS	USSR	Used ever since the Vietnam War.
PX-4	Italy	Used by Mobile Police Command.
Beretta 92	Italy	Less commonly used.
TT-33 (K54)	USSR	Also used by the military and special forces.
Pistolet Makarova (K59)	USSR	Also produced two models: SN9 (8 rounds) and SN9M (12 rounds).
CZ-82	Czechia	The 9×18mm Makarov model of CZ 83 was imported in the 1980s, and now still in use with People's Army of Vietnam and Vietnam People's Public Security.
CZ 75 P-07	Czechia	Widely used from 2012 to the present.
Glock	Austria	Commonly used from 2010 to the present. Includes two versions: Glock 19 and Glock 34.
P-64	Poland	Donated by Poland; exact numbers were unknown. Also used by the People's Public Security in limited number.
HS-9	Croatia	Unknown amount in circulation.
Heckler & Koch MP5	Germany	This includes the Pakistani and Turkish MP5-A3 versions.
Micro Uzi	Israel	The Micro-Uzi is manufactured under the name TK K12 at the Z111 factory according to the technology standards and license provided by Israel. TK-K12 is equipped for the Vietnam Special Forces.
AK-47	USSR	Widely used in the Vietnam War (1954-1975).
Galil ACE	Israel	Limited use since 2010. The IWI has established a $100 million factory in Vietnam via the Z111 Factory, to produce an unspecified number of Galil ACE assault rifles for the PAVN.
STV-380	Vietnam	Used by the 1st Peacekeeping Police Unit.
RPK	USSR	Widely used during the Vietnam War (1964-1975) and from 1976 to the present.
RPD	USSR	Widely used during the Vietnam War (1964-1975) and from 1976 to the present.

== Research ==
Vietnamese law enforcement was involved in policing HIV transmission amongst intravenous drug users:

Police perceive conflicting responsibilities, but overwhelmingly see their responsibility as enforcing drug laws, identifying and knowing drug users, and selecting those for compulsory detention. Harm reduction training was very patchy, ward police not being seen as important to it; and understanding of harm reduction was limited.

— Melissa Jardine, Global Law Enforcement and Public Health Association

The law was changed in 2009, to decriminalize drug use, effective 2010; this triggered a change to one of a harm reduction model.

== See also ==
- Vietnam Coast Guard
- Vietnam Border Guard
