= 2013 conviction of Vietnamese dissidents =

On January 8–9, 2013 a trial was held by the People's Court of Nghệ An Province, Vietnam for 14 democracy activists, primarily belonging to the Catholic church, including high-profile blogger Paulus Le Son. All of them were sentenced to 3–13 years in prison on charges of subversion. Many human rights organizations have called this the "largest case of its kind" in Vietnam, and condemned the sentence. Many organizations, including the US Embassy in Vietnam, have called for an immediate release of the dissidents.

== Defendants ==
All 14 defendants were arrested in 2011 as part of the 2011 crackdown on Vietnamese youth activists. They were writers and political and social activists, mainly belonging to the Redemptorist group. They have engaged in community service and fighting against land seizures and corruption. Recently, many activists have been critical of the Vietnamese government, backing other dissidents and bloggers and called for democracy and human rights. Some defendants have participated in peaceful protests in support of other previously-convicted dissidents.

The defendants were:

Name	Age at time of arrest	Hometown	Background	Date of Arrest	Sentence	Date of Release
Dang Xuan Dieu	32	Vinh City	Businessman	July 30, 2011	13 years prison term	January 12, 2017 (sent to Paris)
Ho Duc Hoa	37	Vinh City	Businessman	August 2, 2011	13 years prison term	Not released
Nguyen Van Oai	31	Vinh City	Catholic activist	July 30, 2011	3 years prison term, 2 years house arrest	July 30, 2015
Paulus Le Son (Le Van Son)	26	Thanh Hóa Province	High profile blogger	August 3, 2011	13 years prison term, 5 years of house arrest	August 3, 2015
Nong Hung Anh	23	Lạng Sơn	Presbyterian activist and student	August 5, 2011	5 years prison term, 3 years house arrest	June 5, 2014
Nguyen Van Duyet	31	Vinh City	Catholic activist	August 7, 2011	6 years prison term, 4 years house arrest	January 30, 2015
Nguyen Xuan Anh	29	Vinh City	Catholic activist	August 7, 2011	3 years prison term, 2 years house arrest	August 7, 2013
Ho Van Oanh	26	Vinh City	Catholic student	August 16, 2011	3 years prison term, 2 years house arrest	February 16, 2014
Thai Van Dung	23	Nghệ An Province	Catholic activist	August 19, 2011	5 years prison term, 3 years house arrest	August 19, 2015
Tran Minh Nhat	23	Lâm Đồng Province	Catholic activist and student	August 27, 2011	4 years prison term, 3 years house arrest	August 27, 2015
Nguyen Dinh Cuong	30	Nghệ An province	Businessman	December 24, 2011	4 years prison term, 3 years house arrest	December 24, 2015
Dang Ngoc Minh	54	Trà Vinh City	Housewife	August 2, 2011	3 years prison term, 2 years of house arrest	June 2, 2014
Nguyen Dang Minh Man	26	Trà Vinh City	Worker	August 2, 2011	8 years prison term, 5 years of house arrest	Not released
Nguyen Dang Vinh Phuc	31	Trà Vinh City	Worker	August 2, 2011	3 years prison term, but the verdict was conditionally suspended	January 9, 2013

Nearly all defendants were bloggers or students. Among the 14 defendants, three of them come from the same family (Dang Ngoc Minh, her son Nguyen Dang Vinh Phuc and her daughter Nguyen Dang Minh Man).

== 2011 Arrests ==
Many of them were arrested in the 2011 by the Vietnamese government for protesting for land rights and circulating a petition to free prominent legal rights activist Cu Huy Ha Vu, a prominent human rights defender who was imprisoned for seven years in April 2011.

Prior the trial, Dang Xuan Dieu was quoted saying "I have done nothing contrary to my conscience", and that in punishing him, the government was "trampling on the eternal good morals of the Vietnamese nation."

== Trial ==
The trial was held in the city of Vinh on January 8 and 9, 2013, by the People's Court of Nghệ An province, Vietnam. The courtroom was packed due to the unusually large number of defendants on trial as well as police.

Outside the courtroom, relatives and supporters of the defendants clashed with hundreds of uniformed as well as plainclothes security police blocking them from gathering outside the court. The police physically attacked many supporters including elderly women and Catholic clergy and some were also temporarily detained. Nguyen Dinh Cuong's mother attempting to attend the trial had also been beaten by police outside the building in the afternoon.

== Charges ==
The defendants were accused of having ties with Viet Tan. All of the 14 defendants rejected the charges. Defendant Nguyen Dinh Cuong's sister-in-law Kim Chi stated that many defendants have attended training workshops organized by Viet Tan on leadership skills and online security, but that their activism was aimed at helping the people, not at overthrowing the government.

Dang Ngoc Minh and her daughter Nguyen Dang Minh Man were accused of painting the slogan "HS.TS.VN" on the walls of a school, which means "Hoang Sa, Truong Sa, Viet Nam". The slogan has been used to support the case in the Paracel and Spratly Islands disputes that the archipelagoes belong to Vietnam, a claim that the Vietnamese government actually endorses.

== Sentence ==
The verdict was announced by Judge Tran Ngoc on January 9, 2013. Three have been sentenced to 13 years, and 11 others to 3–8 years on charges violating Clause 1 of Article 79 of the Vietnamese criminal code for organizing "to attempt to overthrow the government". At the trial, Paulus Le Son was the only one not to have acknowledged any wrongdoings.

According to Human Rights Watch, the supposed charges included attending a training course by Viet Tan in Bangkok, being members of Viet Tan or actively participating with the organization.

A BBC report says that these sentences were among "the harshest given to any political dissident in Vietnam in recent years".

== International Response ==
The United States Embassy in Hanoi stated that it was "deeply troubled" and called the trial a "part of a disturbing human rights trend in Vietnam."

Brad Adams, Asia director of Human Rights Watch, condemned the arrest and calls for the "convictions to be squashed immediately". He states "The conviction of yet more peaceful activists is another example of a government that is increasingly afraid of the opinions of its own people. Instead of imprisoning critics, the Vietnamese government should be honoring them for their efforts to address the myriad problems facing the country that the government itself has also identified." Phil Robertson, the deputy director of the Asia division of Human Rights Watch also followed up with "this was the largest group to be brought to trial together in recent times."

Reporters Without Borders quickly emerged and stated that it is "appalled at the groundless verdict handed down yesterday by a court in northern city of Vinh" and that it is the position to prove his innocence. The statement also reads that "We have proof that the Vietnamese authorities use false pretexts to convict bloggers that criticize them." The organization released a picture of Paulus Le Son attending a training course organized by Reporters Without Borders in Bangkok to prove that he was not meeting with Viet Tan as the prosecutors have claimed.

In a news briefing in Geneva on January 11, Rupert Colville, a spokesperson for the Office of the UN High Commissioner for Human Rights of the United Nations expressed alarm over the fact that "the convictions were handed down after only two days of trial [...] and that these latest convictions [...] exemplify the limited space for critical voices in Vietnam."

In a press release by Amnesty International the organization says that "the conviction and heavy sentencing [...] flies in the face of justice and is part of an escalating government crackdown on freedom of expression."

Duy Hoang, spokesman for Viet Tan, calls the trial "a disregard for peaceful political expression and democratic aspirations." The organization has neither confirmed nor denied that the 14 detained activists are among its members. In an official statement, Viet Tan rejects "the fabrications peddled by the communist court to rationalize the 'subversion' charges".

A statement by US Congresswoman Loretta Sanchez says "the final product of an unjust criminal justice system in this subversion case was a verdict of 100 years imprisonment forced upon 14 patriots."

Other human rights organizations have called this the "largest subversion to be brought in years" in Vietnam.

== Call for Release ==
Many other organizations have called for an immediate release of the defendants including Amnesty International, Electronic Frontier Foundation, English Pen, Human Rights Watch.

On January 4, 2013, Allen Weiner, the director of the Stanford Program in International and Comparative Law at Stanford Law School, filed an updated to a previous petition submitted to the United Nations Working Group on Arbitrary Detention in Geneva contesting the illegal arrest and detention of the defendants.

== See also ==
- 2011 crackdown on Vietnamese youth activists
- Paulus Le Son
- Dang Xuan Dieu
- Ho Duc Hoa
- Nguyen Dang Minh Man
- Thai Van Dung
- Tran Minh Nhat
- Le Quoc Quan
- Viet Tan
- Ta Phong Tan
- Human rights in Vietnam
