= List of political parties in Vietnam =

This article lists political parties in Vietnam.

Vietnam is a Marxist–Leninist one-party state based on democratic centralism. Only one political party, the Communist Party of Vietnam (Đảng Cộng Sản Việt Nam) is legally allowed to hold effective power. Vietnamese elections conform to the popular front principle used in communist countries. The united front in Vietnam is called the Vietnam Fatherland Front and is led by the Communist Party of Vietnam.

== Official parties ==
Party	Abbr.	Founded	Ideology	Political position	Leader	National Assembly
Communist Party of Vietnam; Đảng Cộng sản Việt Nam	CPV	1930	Communism; Marxism–Leninism; Ho Chi Minh Thought	Far-left	Tô Lâm	482 / 500

== Other parties ==
Other parties exist outside Vietnam or secretly operate inside Vietnam as outlawed opposition and dissidents:

Party	Abbr.	Ideology	Political position	Leader	Years active	National Assembly
Vietnam Reform Revolutionary Party; Việt Nam Canh tân Cách mạng Đảng	Việt Tân	Reformism; Liberalism; Liberal democracy; Vietnamese nationalism; Classical pluralism; Anti-communism	Centre	Lý Thái Hùng	1982–2016 (Note: Banned in Vietnam.)	0 / 500
Vietnamese Nationalist Party; Việt Nam Quốc Dân Đảng	VNQDĐ	Vietnamese nationalism; Democratic socialism; Anti-communism; Three Principles of the People	Centre-left to centre-right	Nguyễn Thái Học; Nhất Linh; Vũ Hồng Khanh	1927–1975 (Note: Currently operating in exile.)	0 / 500
Great Viet Nationalist Party; Đại Việt Quốc dân Đảng	ĐVQDĐ	Vietnamese nationalism; Anti-communism; Three Principles of the People	Right-wing	Trần Trọng Đạt	1939–present	0 / 500

- Bloc 8406 (Khối 8406) (prohibited in Vietnam)
- People's Action Party of Vietnam (PAP) (Đảng Nhân Dân Hành Động Việt Nam) (outside Vietnam)
- Vietnam Populist Party (ĐVD) (Đảng Vì Dân) (outside Vietnam, prohibited in Vietnam)

Many members of these parties have been jailed in Vietnam under the charge of "attempt to overthrow the government". Political rights are very limited in Vietnam, especially the right to change the form of government.

== Defunct parties ==
Party	Abbr.	Ideology	Political position	Leader	Years active
League for Independence of Vietnam; Việt Nam Độc lập Đồng minh	Việt Minh	Anti-imperialism; Communism; Marxism–Leninism; Revolutionary socialism; Vietnamese nationalism	Far-left	Hồ Chí Minh	1941–1955
National Liberation Front of South Vietnam; Mặt trận Dân tộc Giải phóng miền Nam Việt Nam	Việt Cộng	Anti-imperialism; Communism; Marxism–Leninism; Revolutionary socialism; Vietnamese nationalism	Far-left	Nguyễn Hữu Thọ	1960–1977
People's Revolutionary Party of Vietnam; Đảng Nhân dân Cách mạng Việt Nam	PRP	Scientific socialism; Marxism-Leninism; Vietnamese nationalism; Vietnamese reunification; Anti-imperialism	Far-left	Võ Chí Công	1962–1976
Democratic Party of Vietnam; Đảng Dân chủ Việt Nam	ĐDCVN	Until 1954: Vietnamese nationalism; Social democracy; From 1954: Democratic socialism; Marxism–Leninism	Centre-left to far-left	Dương Đức Hiền	1944–1988
Socialist Party of Vietnam; Đảng Xã hội Việt Nam	ĐXHVN	Socialism; Vietnamese nationalism	Left-wing	Phan Tư Nghĩa	1946–1988
Vietnamese Democratic Socialist Party; Đảng Dân chủ Xã hội Việt Nam	VDSP	Vietnamese nationalism; Democratic socialism; Social democracy	Centre-left	Huỳnh Phú Sổ	1946–1975
Personalist Labor Revolutionary Party; Cần lao Nhân vị Cách mạng Ðảng	PLRP	Person Dignity Theory; Anti-communism; Vietnamese nationalism	Centre	Ngô Đình Diệm	1954–1963
National Social Democratic Front; Mặt trận Quốc gia Dân chủ Xã hội	NSDF	Secularism; Civic nationalism; Vietnamese nationalism; Anti-communism	Big tent	Nguyễn Văn Thiệu	1967–1975
Restoration League of Vietnam; Việt Nam Quang Phục Hội	VNQPH	Vietnamese nationalism; Three Principles of the People	Centre-right to right-wing	Phan Bội Châu	1912–1925

- Cochinese Democratic Party
- Constitutional Party
- Forces for National Reconciliation
- International Communist League
- Đại Việt National Socialist Party (Đại Việt Quốc gia Xã hội Đảng) (disbanded 1945)
- Daiviet Populist Revolutionary Party (Đại Việt duy dân cách mạng Đảng)
- New Vietnam Revolutionary Party (Tân Việt Cách mạng Đảng) (disbanded 1930)
- Revolutionary Party of Young Annam (Tan-Viet-Cach-Manh-Bung) (disbanded 1930)
- Communist Party of Indochina (Đông Dương Cộng sản Đảng) (disbanded 1930)
- Vietnamese Revolutionary Youth League (Việt Nam Thanh Niên Cách Mệnh Đồng Chí Hội) (disbanded 1929)
- Communist Party of Annam (An Nam cộng sản Đảng) (disbanded 1930)
- Vanguard Youth (Thanh niên Tiền phong) (disbanded 1945)
- Dai Viet Renaissance Society (Đại Việt Phục hưng Hội) (disbanded 1945)
- Communist League of Indochina (Đông Dương Cộng sản Liên đoàn) (disbanded 1930)

== See also ==
- Politics of Vietnam
- List of ruling political parties by country
