= Nguyễn Đặng Minh Mẫn =

Human Rights activist

- Born: January 10, 1985 (age 41)
- Occupations: photojournalist, social activist
- Known for: Democracy activism, 2011 Arrest, 2013 Conviction

Nguyễn Đặng Minh Mẫn (born January 10, 1985) is a human rights activist. Seeing the social inequities in Vietnam, she became a freelance photojournalist and posted photographs online as an alternative news source to state-controlled media.

In 2010, at 25 years old, she participated in the movement against China's territorial claims in the South China Sea Dispute. She captured images of the slogan “HS.TS.VN” that were posted throughout Vietnam to assert Vietnam's claims over the islands of Hoang Sa (Paracel Islands) and Truong Sa (Spratly Islands).

She traveled and documented police brutality, government corruption, and peaceful public protest, including the large anti-China demonstration held in Saigon on June 5, 2011.

On July 31, 2011, Vietnamese authorities arbitrarily detained Minh Mẫn along with her mother (Đặng Ngọc Minh) and brother (Nguyễn Đặng Vĩnh Phúc). During a two-day trial of 14 Vietnamese activists in January 2013, Minh Mẫn received one of the longer sentences, 8 years in prison and 5 years house arrest.

She was imprisoned at Prison Camp 5, Yen Dinh, Thanh Hoa, until her release on August 2, 2019.

== 2011 arrest ==
As part of a massive crackdown on Vietnamese youth activists in 2011, Vietnamese authorities on July 31 arrested Nguyễn Đặng Minh Mẫn, along with her mother, Đặng Ngọc Minh, and her brother, Nguyễn Đặng Vĩnh Phúc. The Vietnamese authorities had no warrant for the arrest and confiscated Minh Mẫn's camera and other photojournalistic materials.

Minh Mẫn and her family were in arbitrary detention for over 17 months before going to trial.

== 2013 conviction ==
On January 8–9, 2013, the People's Court of Nghệ An Province held a trial to convict 14 Vietnamese democracy activists, including Nguyễn Đặng Minh Mẫn. All of them were sentenced between 3–13 years in prison on charges of subversion under Article 79 of Vietnam's Penal Code.

Minh Mẫn and her mother were accused of painting the slogan “HS.TS.VN,” which represents Vietnam's claims to the Paracel and Spratly islands. The Vietnamese government actually agrees with the slogan that asserts the islands belonging to Vietnam, but have a greater fear of public protest getting out of hand.

Along with the other activists on trial, Minh Mẫn was also accused of participating in Việt Tân, a pro-democracy organization that aims to establish democracy and reform Vietnam through peaceful and political means.

Minh Mẫn was initially sentenced to 9 years in prison, but it was later amended to 8 years in prison and 5 years house arrest. She is one of three activists from this trial still arbitrarily detained.

== Treatment in prison ==
Nguyễn Đặng Minh Mẫn is subject to unfair and discriminatory treatment in prison. Amnesty International reported in 2013 that Vietnamese prisoners of conscience “are held in harsh conditions amounting to cruel, inhuman or degrading treatment.” Minh Mẫn is forced to do physical labor, and is socially isolated since officers threaten other prisoners from being friends with political prisoners.

In November 2014, Minh Mẫn was put in near-solitary confinement without clear reasons. Soon after, Minh Mẫn launched repeated hunger strikes to raise awareness about ill-treatment towards prisoners of conscience, weighing 35 kg, or about 77 pounds, after her protest.

Her father Nguyễn Văn Lợi attempts to visit her at least once a month, but he must travel 40 hours to get to the prison camp, sometimes being turned away because prison guards put Minh Mẫn in solitary confinement. Unlike other prisoners of conscience who could speak freely with their guests, Minh Mẫn and her father are separated by glass with guards surrounding them.

== International response ==
On November 28, 2013, the UNWGAD had ruled in favor of activists convicted during the same time with Minh Mẫn, stating that Vietnam violated its international human rights obligations and must “immediate[ly] release” the prisoners of conscience.

A year later, while Nguyễn Đặng Minh Mẫn faced near-solitary confinement and went on hunger strike against prison abuse, students of the Freedom of Expression Law Clinic submitted a petition in November 2014 on Minh Mẫn's behalf to the UN Working Group On Arbitrary Detention (UNWGAD). This petition raises awareness about the Vietnamese government's violation of its international commitments to human rights.

On June 11, 2015, her father Nguyễn Văn Lợi spoke at the Vietnamese Congressional Caucus in the US Capitol Building to raise awareness about the struggles his daughter and other prisoners of conscience must endure while in prison. He explains, "[The prison guards] feed her rice with salt, only give her 1 liter of drinking water a day, not allowing her any water for hygienic reasons, and do not give her a sleeping net. She is only given only one change of clothing for about 15 to 20 days in a month.".

On International Human Rights Day in 2015, a social media and letter writing campaign called #BarsForBlogging was launched to raise awareness about the remaining three prisoners of conscience from the 2013 trial: Nguyễn Đặng Minh Mẫn, Đặng Xuân Diệu, and Hồ Đức Hoà.

== Release from Prison ==
Nguyễn Đặng Minh Mẫn was released from prison on August 2, 2019 after completing her sentence of 8 years. She will now serve 5 years of house arrest.

== See also ==
- 2011 crackdown on Vietnamese youth activists
- 2013 conviction of 14 Vietnamese dissidents
- Human rights in Vietnam
- Hồ Đức Hoà
- Đặng Xuân Diệu
