= Nguyễn Văn Oai =

- Born: 1981 (age 44–45); Nghệ An
- Occupation: Human rights defender
- Known for: Democracy activism, 2011 Arrest, 2013 Conviction, 2017 detention

Nguyễn Văn Oai (born 1981 in Nghệ An Province) is a social rights activists from Quynh Luu district, Nghe An province. He is a Protestant, and studied citizen journalism under Vietnam Redemptorist News. Oai was arrested on August 2, 2011, in Ho Chi Minh City, charged under clause 2 of article 79, and sentenced to three years’ imprisonment plus four years of controlled residence.

Oai was released on August 2, 2015 but re-arrested on January 19, 2017. He was charged with "resisting persons on duty" and "failing to execute judgements" under Article 304. On September 18, 2017, Oai was sentenced to five years in prison and four years of house arrest.

== 2011 Arrest ==
On August 2, 2011, the police detained Oai without a warrant with charges of conspiring to overthrow the government under clause 2 of article 79 of the Penal Code of Vietnam. Oai was held incommunicado for months and had limited access to legal representation.

Oai had participated in activities that protect workers’ rights in Binh Duong province, Hanoi, and Ho Chi Minh City, and also joined in on protests in anti-Chinese aggression towards Vietnam.

Oai’s arrest was a part of the 2011 crackdown on Vietnamese youth activists which included 17 other Vietnamese youth activists. These activists participated in peaceful protests related to China, environmental advocacy, and citizen journalism.

== 2013 Conviction ==
On January 9, 2013, a trial was held by the People's Court of Nghệ An Province for 14 democracy activists, including Oai, who was sentenced to 4 years.

Along with the other activists on trial, Oai was also accused of participating in Việt Tân, a US-based pro-democracy organization to establish democracy and reform Vietnam through peaceful and political means. During the trial, a large number of police were deployed around the court, with police detaining a number of other bloggers who attempted to attend the trial.

== 2015 Release ==
On August 2, 2015 Oai, was released and according to the charges placed, Oai was sentenced to four years house arrest following his release.

== 2017 Arrest and Sentence ==
On January 19, 2017 Oai, was re-arrested and charged with "resisting persons on duty", claiming he was not abiding by the terms of his administrative probation. His arrest was part of the Vietnamese government's latest crackdown on bloggers and citizen journalists including Formosa reporter Nguyễn Văn Hoá. He was also later charged with "failing to execute judgements" under Article 304 of the Vietnamese Penal Code.

Oai's trial was scheduled to begin Monday August 21, 2017 but the court postponed the trial for unknown reasons.

On September 18, 2017 the People's Court in Hoang Mai town, Nghe An province sentenced Nguyen Van Oai to three years in prison for the first charge and two years for the second charge giving him a total of five years imprisonment. He was also sentenced to four years of house arrest. Relatives of Oai were not permitted to enter the courtroom, despite authorities calling the trial to be a "public trial".

== Prison Treatment and Conditions ==
Amnesty International reported in 2013 that Vietnamese prisoners of conscience “are held in harsh conditions amounting to cruel, inhuman or degrading treatment.”

Dissident prisoners receive rations that are spoiled, littered with garbage and provided only up to 10 litres of water for drinking and washing. Inmates of the Catholic faith are further discriminated against by being denied religious reading materials and prohibited from praying or observing their rights, with no other means of expressing their protests beyond hunger strikes.

== International Response ==
On July 25, 2012, Allen Weiner, director of the Stanford Program in International and Comparative Law at Stanford Law School, filed a petition with the United Nations Working Group on Arbitrary Detention (UNWGAD) in Geneva contesting the illegal arrest and on-going detention of seventeen Vietnamese social and political activists. The petition requests the UNWGAD to call upon the Socialist Republic of Vietnam (SRV) to release all of the detainees immediately to remedy the human rights violations stemming from their arbitrary arrest and detention.

On November 28, 2013, the UNWGAD had ruled in favor of the petition, stating that Vietnam violated its international human rights obligations and must “immediate[ly] release” the prisoners of conscience.

Following the 2013 trial, Brad Adams, Asia director of Human Rights Watch, condemned the arrest and calls for the "convictions to be squashed immediately". He states "The conviction of yet more peaceful activists is another example of a government that is increasingly afraid of the opinions of its own people. Instead of imprisoning critics, the Vietnamese government should be honoring them for their efforts to address the myriad problems facing the country that the government itself has also identified.”

On August 18, 2017 RSF called for the immediate release of Oai in response to his trial scheduled on August 21, 2017 (which was postponed to September 18). RSF said: “The charges against him are just a pretext for putting a stop to online posts that annoy the regime. We call on the judicial authorities in Nghe An province to free this blogger unconditionally, because he has committed no crime.”

== See also ==
- Human rights in Vietnam
- 2011 crackdown on Vietnamese youth activists
- 2013 conviction of 14 Vietnamese dissidents
- Paulus Lê Sơn
- Trần Thị Nga
- Nguyễn Văn Hoá
