= Internet censorship in Vietnam =

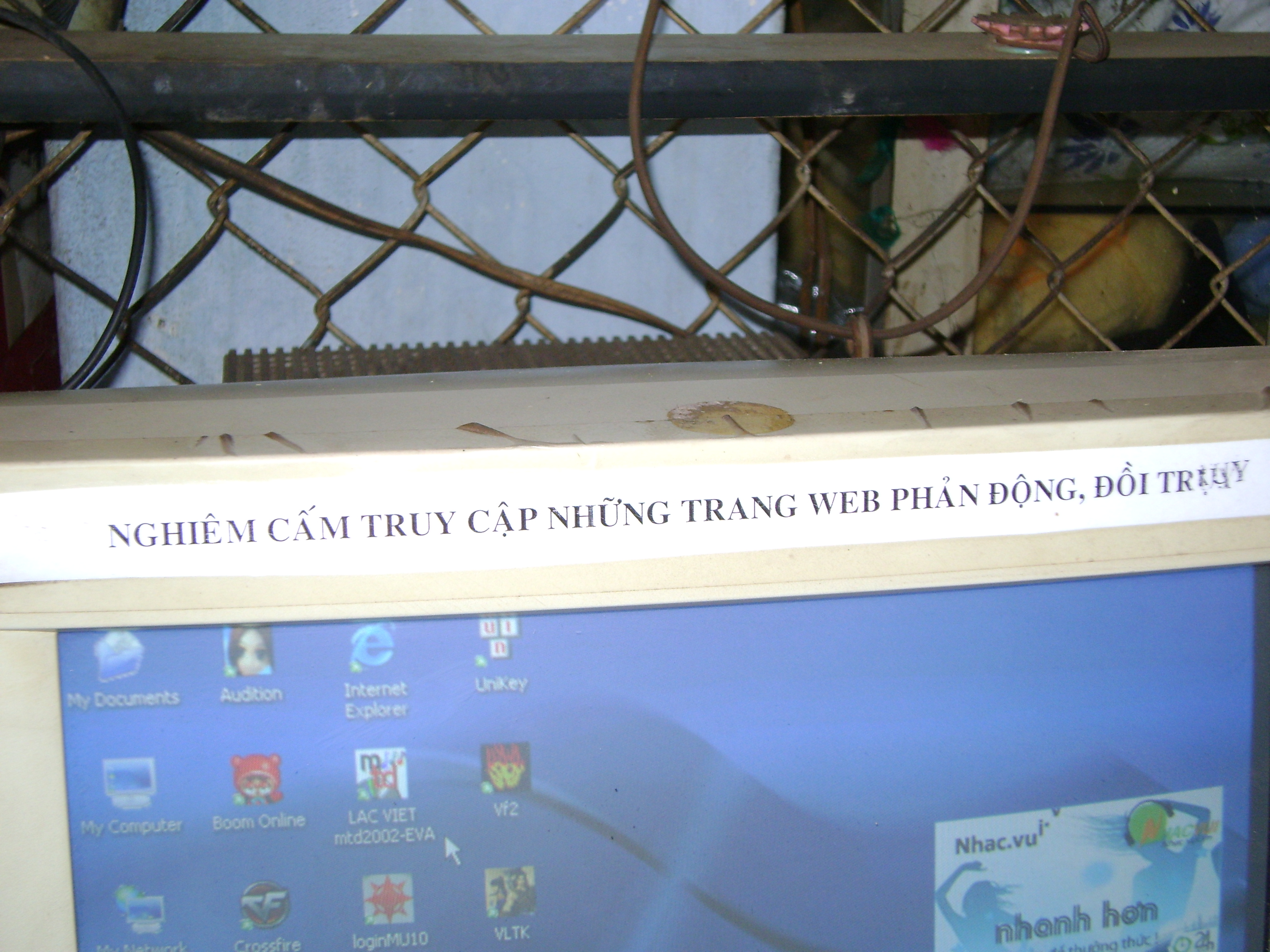
A sign above a computer monitor in an Internet cafe to refrain from accessing sites with "reactionary" or "obscene" content

Internet censorship in Vietnam is implemented in the country, according to a 2009 report from Reporters Without Borders. Vietnam regulates its citizens' Internet access using both legal and technical means. The government's efforts to regulate, monitor, and provide oversight regarding Internet use has been referred to as a "Bamboo Firewall".

The OpenNet Initiative classified the level of filtering in Vietnam as pervasive in the political, as substantial in the Internet tools, and as selective in the social and conflict/security areas in 2011, while Reporters Without Borders consider Vietnam an "internet enemy".

According to a 2006 report by the Berkman Center for Internet & Society at Harvard University, even though the government of Vietnam claims to safeguard the country against obscene or sexually explicit content through its blocking efforts, most of its filtering efforts are aimed at blocking sites with politically or religiously sensitive materials that might undermine the Communist Party and the stability of its one-party rule. Amnesty International reported many instances of Internet activists being arrested for their online activities.

== Background ==
Under its 1997 decree regarding Internet usage, the General Director of the General Postal Bureau has the exclusive authority and primary role in managing the Internet.

== Legal framework ==
Regulatory responsibility for Internet material is divided along subject-matter lines with the Ministry of Culture and Information focusing on sexually explicit or violent content, while the Ministry of Public Security monitors politically sensitive content. Vietnam nominally guarantees freedom of speech, of the press, and of assembly through constitutional provisions, but state security laws and other regulations reduce these formal protections in practice. All information stored on, sent over, or retrieved from the Internet must comply with Vietnam's Press Law, Publication Law, and other laws, including state secrets and intellectual property protections. All domestic and foreign individuals and organizations involved in Internet activity in Vietnam are legally responsible for content created, disseminated, and stored. It is unlawful to use Internet resources or host material that opposes the state; destabilizes Vietnam's security, economy, or social order; incites opposition to the state; discloses state secrets; infringes organizations' or individuals' rights; or interferes with the state's DNS servers. Law on Information Technology was enacted in June 2006. Those who violate Internet use rules are subject to a range of penalties, from fines to criminal liability for offenses such as causing chaos or security disorder.

A 2010 law required public Internet providers, such as Internet cafes, hotels, and businesses providing free Wi-Fi, to install software to track users' activities.

On September 1, 2013, Decree 72 came into effect; making it illegal to distribute any materials online that "harms national security" or "opposes" the government, only allows users to "provide or exchange personal information" through blogs and social media outlets—banning the distribution of "general information" or any information from a media outlet (including state-owned outlets), and requires that foreign web companies operate servers domestically if they target users in Vietnam.

== Censored content ==
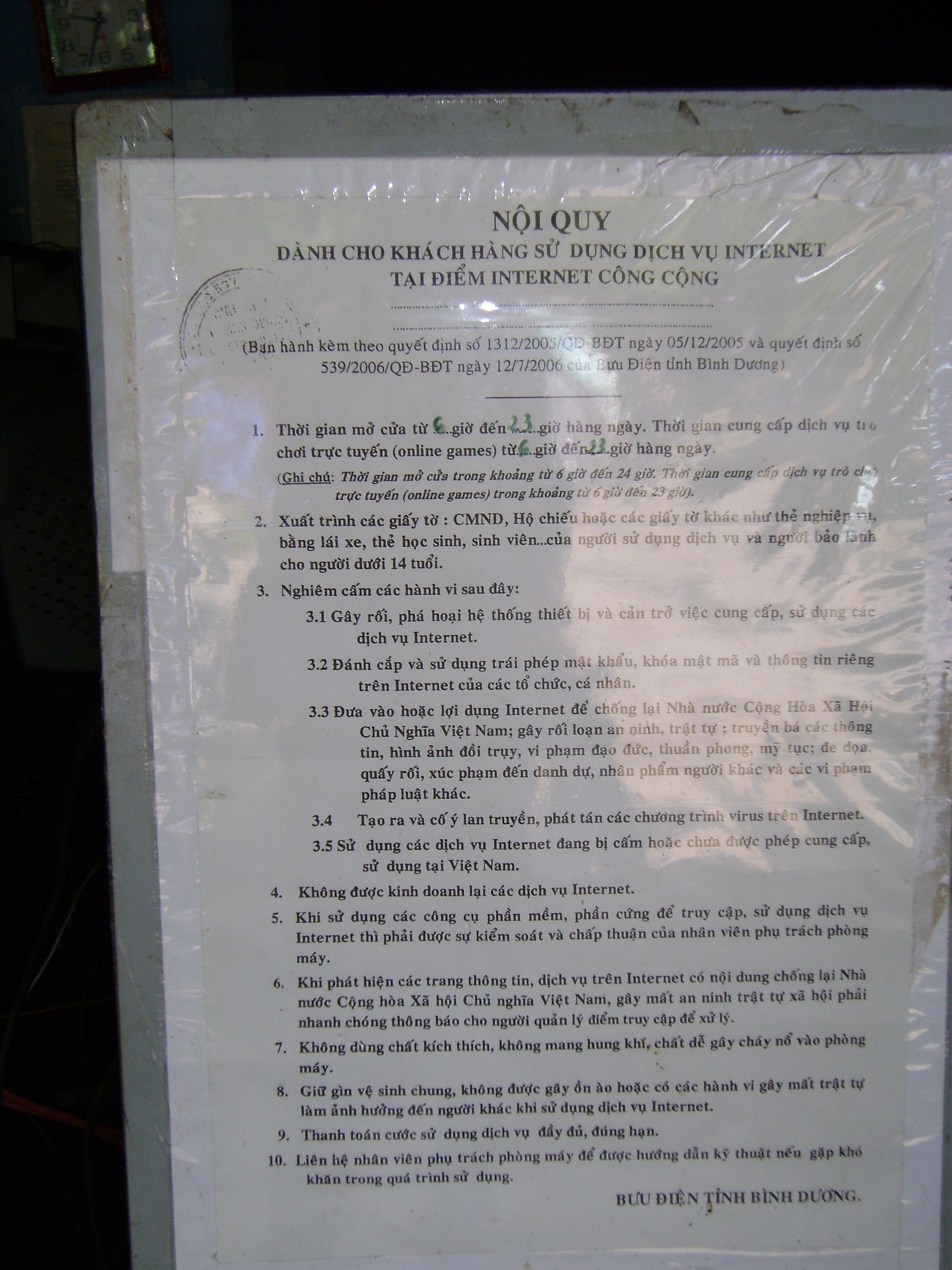
A list of regulations posted at an internet cafe in Ho Chi Minh City. Among the listed rules are those forbidding patrons from accessing sites with subversive or pornographic content.

=== Subversive content ===
According to a 2007 research by OpenNet Initiative, blocking is concentrated on websites with contents about overseas political opposition, overseas and independent media, human rights, and religious topics. Proxies and circumvention tools, which are illegal to use, are also frequently blocked.

The majority of blocked websites are specific to Vietnam: those written in Vietnamese or dealing with issues related to Vietnam. Sites not specifically related to Vietnam or only written in English are rarely blocked. For example, the Vietnamese-language version of the website for Radio Free Asia was blocked by both tested ISPs while the English-language version was only blocked by one. While only the website for the human rights organization Human Rights Watch was blocked in the tested list of global human rights sites, many Vietnamese-language sites only tangentially or indirectly critical of the government were blocked as well as sites strongly critical of the government.

The website of the British Broadcasting Corporation (www.bbc.co.uk), which has a significant journalistic presence, is an example of a website that is blocked—albeit intermittently.

=== Pornography ===
In November 2019, Vietnamese ISPs blocked porn sites.

=== Social networking ===
The popular social networking website Facebook has about 8.5 million users in Vietnam and its user base has been growing quickly after the website added a Vietnamese-language interface. During the week of November 16, 2009, Vietnamese Facebook users reported being unable to access the website. Access had been intermittent in the previous weeks, and there were reports of technicians ordered by the government to block access to Facebook.

A supposedly official decree dated August 27, 2009, was earlier leaked on the Internet, but its authenticity has not been confirmed. The Vietnamese government denied deliberately blocking access to Facebook, and the Internet service provider FPT said that it is working with foreign companies to solve a fault blocking to Facebook's servers in the United States.

In June 2025, Vietnamese authorities ordered a nationwide block of the Telegram messaging platform, citing concerns over national security and the spread of illegal content. The ban followed a government report claiming over 68% of Vietnamese Telegram channels were used for activities breaching national laws, and represents a continued tightening of state control over digital communications and social media platforms.

=== Blogging ===
In 2013, Associated Press reported that the Ministry of Information and Communications were preparing new rules that would restrict blogs to personal matters.

Global Voices Advocacy maintains a list of bloggers who have been arrested for their views expressed online. Many bloggers were arrested by the Vietnamese government during the 2011 crackdown on Vietnamese youth activists.

In 2020, Medium was blocked.

=== Online gaming ===
On 7 May 2024, the digital game distribution platform Steam was blocked by most major Vietnamese ISPs, with many users reports an inability to access the storefront. Speculations on the reasoning behind the block was due to government officials "finding solutions to prevent cross-border services from reaching Vietnamese users" on grounds of "releasing games without permissions". According to the Ministry of Information and Communications, Steam did not respond and comply with them for licensing games to be sold in Vietnam leading to Steam's online services being blocked through ISPs.

== Persecution for illegal Internet activities ==
A component of Vietnam's strategy to control the Internet consists of the arrest of bloggers, netizens and journalists. The goal of these arrests is to prevent dissidents from pursuing their activities, and to persuade others to practice self-censorship. Vietnam is the world's second largest prison for netizens after China.

- Phan Thanh Hai, also known as Anh Ba Saigon, was arrested in October 2010 and later charged with promoting "propaganda against the State" for spreading false information on his blog, where he had discussed topics such as maritime disputes with China and bauxite mining operations, and had actively supported Vietnamese dissidents.
- Blogger Paulus Lê Sơn was arrested on August 3, 2011, in Hanoi for his attempt to cover the trial of the well known cyberdissident Cu Huy Ha Vu.
- Long time dissident and Catholic priest Nguyen Van Ly is a member of the Bloc 8406 pro-democracy movement. He was arrested on 19 February and sentenced on 30 March 2007 to eight years in prison for committing "very serious crimes that harmed national security" by trying to organize a boycott of the upcoming election. He may have suffered a stroke while in prison on 14 November 2009. He was released from prison to receive medical care on 17 March 2010 and was returned to prison in July 2011 despite his old age and poor health.
- Blogger Lư Văn Bảy, also known by the pen-names Tran Bao Viet, Chanh Trung, Hoang Trung Chanh, Hoang Trung Viet and Nguyen Hoang, received a four-year prison sentence plus three years of house arrest in September 2011 on a charge of anti-government propaganda under article 88 of the criminal code. Ten articles calling for multi-party democracy, which he had posted online, were cited by the prosecution during the trial. He was not allowed access to a lawyer at his trial.
- Le Cong Dinh, a prominent Vietnamese lawyer who sat on the defense of many high-profile human rights cases in Vietnam and was critical of bauxite mining in the central highlands of Vietnam was arrested by the Vietnamese government on 13 June 2009 under article 88 of Vietnam's criminal code for "conducting propaganda against the government". On 20 January 2010, he was convicted and sentenced to five years in prison for subversion. His co-defendants, Nguyễn Tiến Trung, Trần Huỳnh Duy Thức, and Lê Thang Long received sentences from 7 to 16 years.
- Franco-Vietnamese blogger Pham Minh Hoang was released from prison after serving his 17-month sentence, but remains under a three-year house arrest. He was arrested on 13 August and charged on 20 September 2010 with "carrying out activities with the intent of overthrowing the government" by virtue of Article 79 of the Penal Code, for having joined the banned opposition party, Viet Tan, and publishing on his blog (pkquoc.multiply.com) opposition articles under the pen name Phan Kien Quoc. According to his wife, Le Thi Kieu Oanh, Pham Minh Hoang was arrested because of his opposition to a Chinese company's plans to mine bauxite in central Vietnam's high plateau region.
- Blogger Dieu Cay was arrested in April 2008 and sentenced in September 2008 for "tax fraud". The authorities were actually seeking to silence him after he had publicly called for people to boycott the Ho Chi Minh City leg of the Olympic torch relay on the occasion of Beijing's 2008 Summer Olympics. He was initially supposed to be released in October 2010 after serving his two and one-half year prison sentence, but he was still in detention, while also charged for propaganda against the state and the Party by virtue of Article 88 of the Vietnamese Penal Code. His relatives have had no news of him for months, leading to widespread alarmist rumors. Concerns about his fate and health remain justified as long as the authorities refuse to grant his family visitation rights. He was eventually released in October 2014 and moved to the US
- Blogger Nguyen Van Tinh and poet Tran Duc Thach were released in 2011 after being sentenced in 2009 to three and one-half and three years in prison, respectively, for "propaganda against the socialist state of Vietnam".
- In February 2017, the Vietnamese government arrested and prosecuted bloggers and citizen journalists in a crackdown, including Nguyễn Văn Oai and Nguyễn Văn Hoá. Hoá was prosecuted to seven years in prison for reporting about the 2016 Vietnam marine life disaster.
- Pham Chi Dung, a prominent independent journalist, chairman of the Vietnam Independent Journalists Society (IJAVN) and founder of the news website vietnamthoibao.org, was arrested on November 21, 2019, by the public security forces of Ho Chi Minh City. He is charged under Article 117 of Vietnam 2015 Criminal Code for "producing, storing, and disseminating" documents opposing the Socialist Republic of Vietnam. While state media asserts that he has participated in "very dangerous and serious conduct that negatively affects national social stability, public order of Ho Chi Minh City," they can only point out one fact to support that accusation: that he established and organized a "civil society organization." The arrest of Pham Chi Dung, is the continuation of an intensified crackdown against political activists.
- Nguyen Tuong Thuy, a 68-year-old blogger and IJAVN vice-president, was arrested on 23 May 2020 in Hanoi, where he lives, and was immediately transported 1,700 km south of the capital to Ho Chi Minh City, where he continues to be held. Nguyen Tuong Thuy served in the PAVN for 22 years. Thuy became a reporter for Radio Free Asia (RFA), which is funded by the US Congress.
