= Trần Minh Nhật =

Vietnamese journalist and human rights activist

- Born: 1998 (age 27–28); Vietnam
- Occupation: Citizen journalist
- Known for: Democracy Activist

Trần Minh Nhật is a Vietnamese journalist and human rights activist from the province of Lam Dong in the south of Vietnam. On August 27, 2011, the Vietnamese government arrested Nhật and charged him with “carrying out activities aimed at overthrowing the people’s administration” under Article 79 of Vietnam's Criminal Code due to his writings in favor of free speech and a pluralist political system in Vietnam. Nhật was found guilty and sentenced to four years in prison with an additional three years of probation. He was eventually released on August 28, 2015, after completing his prison sentence where he has faced constant harassment by the police.

== Background ==
Trần Minh Nhật is a journalist and blogger for the Vietnam Redemptorist News, an independent Catholic news outlet that reports on religious, social, and human rights issues in Vietnam. As a member of the Redemptorist Ky Dong church in Ho Chi Minh City, Nhật was known for contributing political writings in support of democracy and human rights to the church's website.

== 2011 Arrest ==
In 2011, Trần Minh Nhật assisted in organizing and participating in protests against China’s policies in regards to the South China Sea and their bauxite mining operations in Vietnam’s Central Highlands. Including this, Nhật wrote for the Redemptorist News blogging for freedom of speech and supporting a multi-party, pluralist political system.

On August 27, 2011, Nhật was arrested at the Ho Chi Minh City University of Foreign Languages and Information Technology and charged under Clause 2 of Article 79 of Vietnam’s Criminal Code for “activities aiming to overthrow the people’s government,” a strategy often used by the Vietnamese government to charge and convict pro-democracy activists.

On January 9, 2013, a trial was held by the People's Court of Nghe An Province where Nhật and 13 other activists were found guilty of “carrying out activities with intent to overthrow the people’s administration” due to his political activities and involvement with the banned opposition group Viet Tan. He was sentenced to four years in prison and three years of probation.

=== International response ===
After the verdict, Human Rights Watch released a press statement calling for Vietnamese Prime Minister Nguyen Tan Dung to immediately “withdraw all the charges against those who are held pending trial and for those who have been sentenced to be unconditionally exonerated.”

On December 13, 2011, Congresswoman Susan Davis of California's 53rd District and a member of the Congressional Caucus on Vietnam spoke to the United States Congress on behalf of the 14 arrested Catholic Vietnamese youth activists. The Congresswoman called on her colleagues to “stand side-by-side with these brave individuals and raise their voice in demanding that the Government of Vietnam release all prisoners of conscience and uphold their commitment to human rights for all.”

Following the trial, Phil Robertson, deputy director of the Asia division of Human Rights Watch, stated that “this was the largest group to be brought to trial together in recent times.” Brad Adams, Asia director of Human Rights Watch, condemned the arrests and stated that “The conviction of yet more peaceful activists is another example of a government that is increasingly afraid of the opinions of its own people. Instead of imprisoning critics, the Vietnamese government should be honoring them for their efforts to address the myriad problems facing the country that the government itself has also identified."

=== Detention ===
During his time at the Nghi Kim prison, Nhật was treated poorly and forced to live in harsh prison conditions in severe summer weather while being denied basic medicines and reading material. Inside the prison, Nhật went on a prolonged hunger strike to protest these unfair conditions and treatment he and his fellow prisoners faced. Nhật was also pressured to sign a confession in order to receive a shorter sentence but openly refused, stating that he was “not guilty and nobody can force me to sign a confession.”

On January 8, 2013, he appealed to reduce his jail sentence but was denied by the courts, though he did not have to face probation anymore after completing his jail sentence.

== Release ==
Trần Minh Nhật was released on August 28, 2015, after serving his four-year prison sentence. Since his release, Nhật and his family have been constantly harassed by authorities.

On November 8, 2015, Nhật and his companion Chu Manh Son were arrested by the police in Dinh Van in the Central Highlands province while traveling south to Ho Chi Minh City for medical treatment. He was accused of being in communication with a Redemptorist priest and using money to carry out insubordinate activities against the state. After being taken to the local police station, both men were severely beaten and assaulted.

On both December 24, 2015 and January 2, 2016, unknown individuals broke into Nhật's property to damage his family's home. Much of the vegetation such as the pepper vines, coffee plants, and avocado trees were either chemically poisoned or chopped down and irrigation pipes were destroyed. These unknown individuals are suspected to have been hired by the Vietnamese police as another form of harassment to discourage Nhật from continuing his human rights work.

From February 10 to February 22, 2016, Nhật was again attacked by the police both inside and outside his home in the Lam Ha district of Lam Dong. His family's coffee plants were again set on fire, masked men threw stones at their homestead, and a police officer came to his front door and demanded Nhật to come out outside where he then abruptly attacked him with a rock causing severe head trauma.

=== International response ===
Desperate for relief, Nhật went to Radio Free Asia asking for help in making public his current situation. As he told Radio Free Asia reporter Gia Minh, “My current situation is alarming because they sprayed pesticides all around my residence. I could die inside my house because of the toxicity. Even when I stepped outside to take care of our chickens I wanted to throw up because of the smell […] They threw stones at our window, breaking glass and light bulbs. People who watch my house always have their weapon in their vehicles. I'm very worried.”

Australian House Representative Chris Hayes for the Division of Fowler, New South Wales presented Nhật's situation before parliament, commending him for his courage as a human rights activist: “He is a person whose human rights have certainly been offended, but his crime was that he stood up for the human rights of others. Wherever human rights abuse occurs—and particularly where it involves a valued trading partner—it should be a concern for all of us.” He demanded that the government take action immediately for this injustice, stating that “To ignore is to excuse, which in turn leads to acceptance. We need to stand up for individuals who are brave enough to stand up for the rights of others.”

The attacks on Nhật, his family, and his property was condemned by organizations and individuals worldwide including Amnesty International, English Pen, and Front Line Defenders.

== See also ==
- Human rights in Vietnam
- 2011 crackdown on Vietnamese youth activists
- Dang Xuan Dieu
- Ho Duc Hoa
- Paulus Le Son
- Ta Phong Tan
- Lê Đình Lượng
