= Trần Thị Thúy =

Vietnamese land rights activist

Trần Thị Thúy is a Vietnamese land rights activist who was arrested in Vietnam in 2011. She is currently serving an 8-year jail sentence in An Phuoc Detention Center in Binh Duong. Tran Thi Thuy is a member of pro-democracy political party, Viet Tan

== 2010 Arrest ==
On August 10, Thuy was arrested at her home by members of the Public Security without an arrest warrant. Thuy's family was not informed of the arrest until 10 days later, when they received a communique notifying them of the arrest.

== 2011 Conviction ==
On May 30, during a one-day trial held in Southern Ben Tre, Thuy was charged under Article 79, attempting to overthrow the government, an article typically used to imprison peaceful activists, and sentenced to an eight-year prison term and five years under house arrest. Six other people were tried with Thuy, including Pastor Duong Kim Khai, Nguyen Thanh Tam, Pham Van Thong, Cao Van Tinh, Nguyen Chi Thanh, and Pham Ngoc Hoa. All seven defendants were charged under Article 79 of Vietnam's Penal Code and received jail terms between two and eight years

The May 30 trial was heavily secured and sealed-off by uniformed and plainclothes police.

== Prison Treatment and Conditions ==
Since her arrest, Thuy has been subjected to physical abuse and the denial of medical treatment. Prior to the trial, Thuy had been beaten in the abdomen by security police.

Since her imprisonment, Thuy was subject to forced labour, specifically, the husking and skinning of cashews. She was not given proper protection and suffered caustic burns on her skin as a result. Thuy was given long hours of work which resulted in repeated fainting spells.

Thuy is being jailed with common criminals who have been ordered to intimidate her by prison authorities.

In April 2015, Thuy became seriously ill with a uterine tumor. She was denied sufficient medical treatment and was told that she must admit to her crime or die in prison.

On September 2, 2016, upon visiting Thuy, her brother, Tran Anh Tuan informed Amnesty International that her health has seriously deteriorated and that she did not initially recognize who he was due to being in a confused state.

On October 11, 2016, an Amnesty International update said that Thuy's health was deteriorating rapidly. She had been in excruciating pain and her tumours had begun to ulcerate. Food and medication have continued to be withheld by authorities until she confesses.

== International Response ==
The arrest, conviction and mistreatment of Thuy has been condemned by various organizations and individuals worldwide.

- In 2011, Thuy's mother, Bui Thi Nu, wrote an appeal addressed to the UNHRC, International human rights organizations, media organizations, and friends from all over the world. The appeal disclosed the deliberate obstruction of Thuy's lawyer, who was ejected from the court during the trial, Thuy's deteriorating health conditions and denial of medical treatment, continuous threats made against Thuy. She urged the international community to demand justice and safety for her daughter.
- In 2012, Viet Tan called for urgent intervention from the International community of her harsh treatment.
- In 2011, the UNWGAD stated that basis of the detention of Thuy and the other six activists was arbitrary and in violation of international law.
- In December 2015, Amnesty International issued an urgent call to action to demand proper medical care for Thuy. The call to action states that this “denial of treatment in these circumstances could amount to torture and therefore a violation of the Convention against Torture, which came into force in Viet Nam in February after ratification last year. “
- In September 2016, Amnesty International issued another urgent call to action calling on the authorities to immediately provide medical attention, and to immediately release her as she is a “prisoner of conscience, detained solely for peaceful activities defending human rights”.amount to torture and therefore a violation of the Convention against Torture, which came into force in Vietnam in February after ratification last year."

The following politicians have also raised concerns over Thuy's arrest and treatment in prison:

- Australian Member Parliament, Bernie Ripoll
- American Member of Congress, Loretta Sanchez
- Australian Member Parliament, Luke Donellan
- Canadian Member of Parliament, Judy Sgro
- American Member of Congress Joseph Cao
- American Member of Congress Zoe Lofgren
- American Member of Congress Dan Burton
- American Member of Congress Gerald Connolly
- American Member of Congress Daniel Lungren
- American Member of Congress David Wu
- American Member of Congress John Culberson
- American Member of Congress Judy Chu
- American Member of Congress James McGovern
