= Vietnamese democracy movement =

Democracy Movements of Vietnam
- Part of human rights and civil society
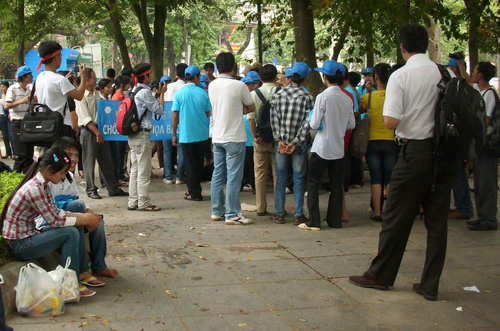
- Việt Tân’s civic demonstration in Hanoi on October 9, 2010
- Date: 1975 – present
- Location: Vietnam; United States; Australia; France; United Kingdom; Germany; Japan; Taiwan; Hong Kong
- Caused by: One party rule of the CPV; Enforcement of land recovery; Corruption, inflation and social inequality; Suppression of dissent; Internet censorship; Anti-communism
- Methods: Demonstrations, strikes
- Status: Ongoing

The Vietnamese democracy movement, also known as the Vietnamese dissident movement and Vietnamese opposition, comprise any of various isolated efforts to dissolve the current communist state and seek a liberal democracy for Vietnam after the Fall of Saigon on 30 April 1975. There is not a major movement in Vietnam to reform the current political system. Opposition to governance has been characterised by sporadic calls for reform by minor groups and rare, small protests. Vietnam was ranked 37th most electoral democratic country in Asia according to V-Dem Democracy indices in 2023 with a score of 0.157 out of 1.

Flag of South Vietnam, used by some anti-communist and pro-democracy movements

== Background ==
Vietnam is a single-party socialist state ruled by a communist party. However, internet censorship in Vietnam is poorly executed and virtually non-existent. Even websites blocked by the government are commonly circumvented with such ease; any "block" is rapidly overcome.

=== Bauxite crisis ===
In 2006, the Manifesto on Freedom and Democracy for Vietnam called for democratic reforms. The related Bloc 8406 is a small unified coalition of groups in Vietnam that advocate for democracy reforms in Vietnam. It was originally signed by 118 dissidents calling for a multiparty state. The support later grew into the thousands. New York City-based organisation Human Rights Watch stated, "It’s extraordinary that hundreds of citizens across Vietnam have boldly shown their support for political change in a written petition. In Vietnam, the mere act of signing such documents routinely triggers a police investigation, detention and often imprisonment."

A draft mining plan for bauxite was approved by the Vietnamese government in 2007. Vinacomin, a Vietnamese mining company, has laid out a plan for 6 bauxite mining projects covering over 1800 square kilometers in Vietnam's mountainous Central Highlands. The first two processing plants for the plan have been contracted to Chalco, a Chinese mining company. The Nhan Co project in Đắk Nông Province and the Tan Rai complex in Lâm Đồng Province are expected to produce 600,000 tons of alumina per year. Vietnam has indicated that it needs about $15.6 billion to invest in major bauxite and alumina refining projects by 2025. Prime Minister Nguyễn Tấn Dũng has approved several large mining projects for the Central Highlands, asserting that bauxite exploitation is "a major policy of the party and the state."

The mining plans have met with strong criticism from scientists, environmentalists and Vietnam's general population. Forests and agricultural land used by coffee and tea farmers are threatened by the plans and opponents have raised concerns about the toxic waste red mud generated through the refinement of bauxite. Vietnamese general Võ Nguyên Giáp has offered strong criticism of the plans, saying that a 1980s study led to experts advising against mining due to severe ecological damage.

In March 2010, Google indicated that malicious software targeting Vietnamese opponents of bauxite mining had infected potentially tens of thousands of users. The malware was used in denial-of-service attacks against dissenting political blogs and installed itself after users downloaded altered Vietnamese language software. The malware was also used to spy on users. The cyber attacks appeared to be a politically motivated attack, according to George Kurtz of McAfee. Vietnamese Foreign Ministry Spokesperson Nguyễn Phương Nga claimed such comments were groundless.

In November 2010, Nguyen Tan Dung, the prime minister of Vietnam, announced that Vietnam's bauxite deposits might total 11,000 Mt; this would be the largest in the world.

=== No-U Movement ===
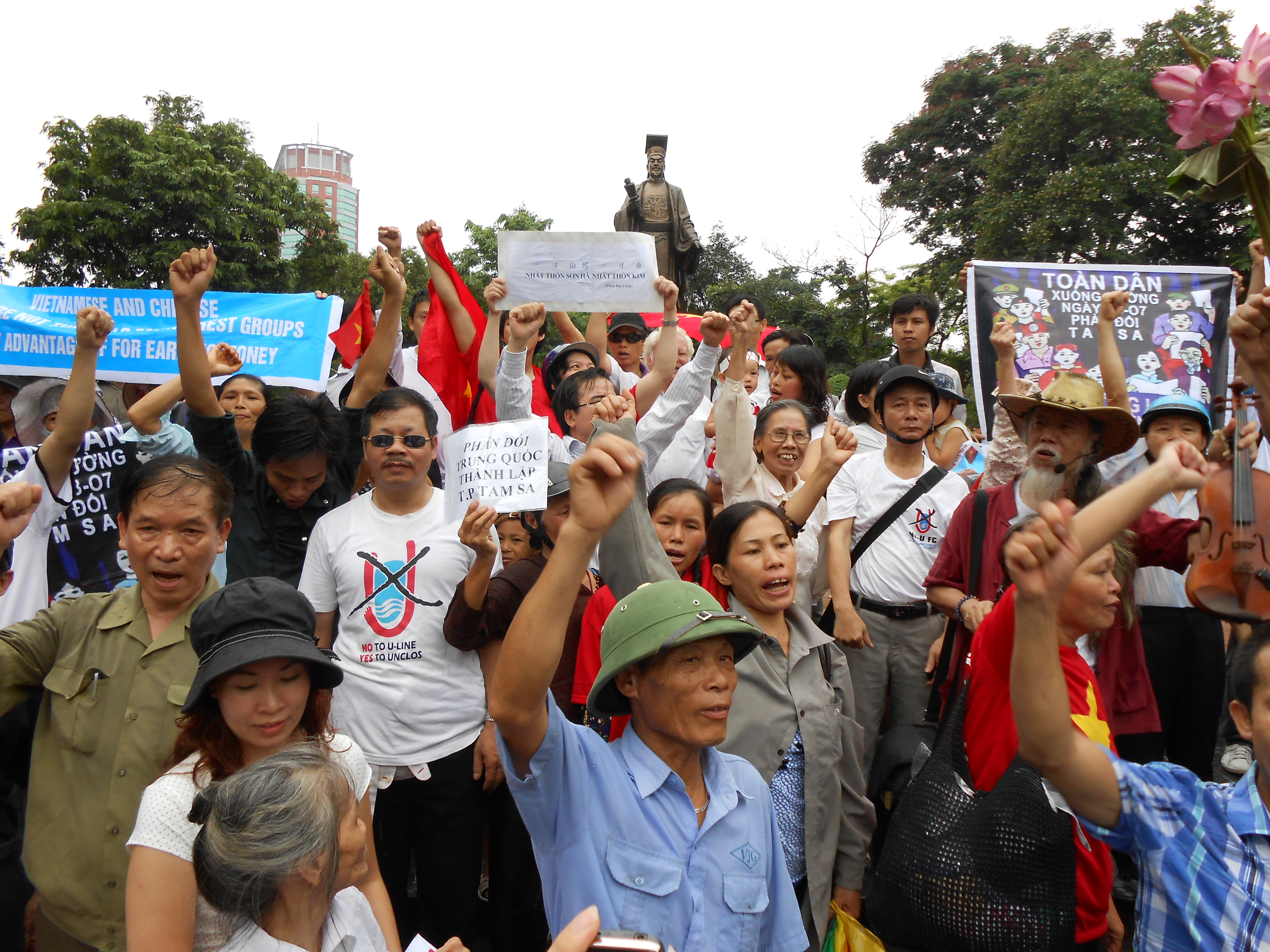
2012 Vietnamese anti-Chinese protests in Hanoi.

Following the Chinese "Jasmine Revolution" in early 2011, Dr. Nguyen Dan Que posted an appeal on the internet for mass demonstrations in Vietnam. He was then detained by the authorities. Rare protests and a self-immolation were reported in Ho Chi Minh City and Danang. Nguyen was arrested on 26 February 2011 because security services said he was caught "red-handed keeping and distributing documents" that called for an uprising similar to the Arab Spring.

The 2014 oil rig incident has unleashed a series of anti-China protests and demonstrations in Vietnam. The demonstrations were initially peaceful in nature and displayed popular support for the government's tough rhetoric towards China. These demonstrations were seen to embody pro-government nationalism.

However, the pro-government nationalism has evolved into anti-government sentiment as peaceful protests escalated into violent riots. Analysts have suggested that the riots, which occurred predominantly in industrial parks and have targeted both Chinese and non-Chinese factories, were influenced by several factors. Beyond anti-China sentiment, the riots were also seen to reflect the growing discontent among Vietnam's rapidly growing industrial workforce, as well as the wider dissatisfaction towards the Vietnamese leadership.

== See also ==
- Chinese democracy movement
- Việt Tân
- Human rights in Vietnam
- Internet censorship in Vietnam
- People's Action Party of Vietnam
- The Vietnamese Gulag
- Flag of South Vietnam
