= Trần Quốc Hiền =

Vietnamese union leader and dissident

Tran Quoc Hien
- Born: c. 1965
- Occupation: lawyer
- Organization(s): United Workers-Farmers Organization; Bloc 8406
- Known for: 2007-2012 imprisonment

Trần Quốc Hiền (born c. 1965) is a Vietnamese lawyer and author imprisoned by the Vietnamese government for his union activities. His detention was protested by several international human rights organizations, including Amnesty International, which named him a prisoner of conscience.

Tran was director of a law firm in Ho Chi Minh City, where he specialized in defending farmers whose land had been confiscated by the government. He also posted articles critical to the government online, such as "The Tail", a description of life under government surveillance.

On 10 January 2007, Tran became the spokesman of the United Workers-Farmers Organization (UWFO) after four other leaders (Tran Thi Le Hang, Nguyen Tan Hoanh, Doan Van Dien, and Doan Huy Chuong) were arrested in advance of an Asia-Pacific Economic Cooperation summit held in Vietnam. Tran had previously worked as a legal consultant for the group. Two days later, he was arrested. Authorities charged Tran with "spreading propaganda against the state" and "endangering state security". He was also accused of being a member of Bloc 8406, a Vietnamese pro-democracy movement.

Following a four-hour trial on 15 May 2007, Tran was found guilty on both charges. He was sentenced on 25 May to five years' imprisonment and two years' house arrest.

Tran's sentence was protested by several major human rights organizations, including PEN International, Human Rights Watch, Reporters without Borders, and Amnesty International, which granted Tran "prisoner of conscience" status and demanded his release.

In Spring 2011, Boston's American Repertory Theater and System of a Down's Serj Tankian dedicated their production of Prometheus Bound to Tran Quoc Hien, Doan Van Dien, Doan Huy Chuong, and seven other Amnesty International cases, stating in program notes that "by singing the story of Prometheus, the God who defied the tyrant Zeus by giving the human race both fire and art, this production hopes to give a voice to those currently being silenced or endangered by modern-day oppressors."

He was released from prison on 11 January 2012, having completed his five-year sentence. He alleged that following his release, he was kept under constant surveillance, and in February, was deliberately driven off the road by Vietnamese secret police (MPS) agents. In August 2012, he escaped the country to Thailand, applying for political asylum through the United Nations High Commissioner for Refugees, stating, "my defection will help me to continue the struggle for democracy and human rights in Vietnam".
