= Thái Văn Dung =

Vietnamese activist

- Born: 1988 (age 37–38)
- Known for: Democracy Activism

Thái Văn Dung is a Vietnamese member of the Catholic Church. He was arrested in Vietnam on 19 August 2011, sentenced to 4 years of prison and 4 years of house arrest.

== 2011 arrest ==
Dung was arrested on August 19, 2011 in Hanoi, Vietnam. He was charged with conspiracy to overthrow the Vietnamese government under clause 2, Article 79 of the Criminal Code. The arrest happened during the 2011 crackdown on Vietnamese youth activists, which included 17 other Vietnamese youth activists.

== 2013 conviction ==
On January 8–9, 2013, 14 Catholic and Protestant activists, one of whom was Thái Văn Dung, stood before the People’s Court of Nghệ An Province on trial. All were sentenced to 3–13 years in prison on charges of subversion. Dung was accused of maintaining ties with Viet Tan, a US-based pro-democracy organization to establish democracy and reform Vietnam through peaceful and political means.

== 2015 release ==
On August 19, 2015, Thai Van Dung was released. After 4 years of imprisonment, he confessed “I will bring awareness on the suppressed freedoms of religion and human rights people face in prison”. Dung claims he will continue to protest for Vietnam democracy and is mentally prepared to face prison again.

== Treatment in prison ==
He was transferred between K3, K5, and K6 prisons and was locked in rooms between 7-9 square meters. On two occasions, Dung was disciplined for disobeying prison officials' orders because he starved himself after they denied him access to newspapers, radio, TV, and an electric fan. He repeatedly requested human rights and freedom of religion from prison officials, and protested the harsh treatment throughout his time in prison. At the same time, authorities continued to pressure him to confess his crime every 3 months.

== See also ==
- 2011 crackdown on Vietnamese youth activists
- 2013 conviction of 14 Vietnamese dissidents
- Human rights in Vietnam
- Viet Tan
