= Phạm Minh Hoàng =

Phạm Minh Hoàng (born 1955) is a French-Vietnamese blogger and lecturer in applied mathematics at the Ho Chi Minh City University of Technology, who was arrested in Vietnam for his political writing and activism on August 13, 2010. Phạm Minh Hoàng, who writes with the pen name Phan Kien Quoc, was convicted on August 10, 2011 for writing “33 Articles that distort the Policies and Guidelines of the Party and the State.” He was sentenced to three years in jail and three years of probation under Article 79, “subversion of administration”—one of many penal codes defined vaguely and used to detain and arrest political activists but served only 17 months and spend another three years under house arrest. Phạm Minh Hoàng was based in Ho Chi Minh City, Vietnam where he used to lecture at the university and offered free classes for Vietnamese youth on leadership skills. In June 2017, he published a call for help on his Facebook page upon receiving the news that he is likely to lose his Vietnamese citizenship and be deported to France. Hoang was detained by local authorities on June 23 before being forcibly exiled to France the following day.

== Background ==
Phạm Minh Hoàng was born on August 8, 1955 in Vung Tau, what is now Ba Ria-Vung Tau Province. In 1973, Hoàng left to study in France. Hoàng lived, studied, and worked in France for 28 years, during which time he officially joined the political party, Viet Tan. Hoang returned to Vietnam in 2000, and worked as a lecturer at the Ho Chi Minh City Polytechnic University. Before his arrest on August 13, 2010, Hoàng wrote articles about political and social issues in Vietnam, which were published on his blog under pseudonym Phan Kien Quoc. To empower young Vietnamese to become leaders and serve the community, Hoàng also started teaching free classes on leadership skills. Hoàng's political articles and leadership classes were the basis for his arrest in 2010.

== 2010 Arrest ==
When Phạm Minh Hoàng as arrested on August 13, 2010, he was detained in secret and unlawfully. His arrest was unconfirmed by Vietnamese authorities until September 9, 2010, when Viet Tan published the details online. At the time, Hoàng was 55 years old and lecturing at the Ho Chi Minh City Polytechnic Institute. According to Hoàng's lawyer, Tran Vu Hai, Hoàng admitted to writing the essays, but did not believe he committed any crime against the state.

== Revocation of Vietnamese citizenship and forced exile ==
On June 1, 2017, the French Consulate in Ho Chi Minh City invited Hoàng to inform him of the Vietnamese government's decision to revoke his Vietnamese citizenship on May 17, 2017. Phạm Minh Hoàng stated he would be separated from his wife due to his family's situation if he were to be deported. Hoàng received the official letter from authorities on June 10, 2017 on the decision to revoke his Vietnamese citizenship which was signed by the President of Vietnam Trần Đại Quang. Reporters Without Borders said this was the first incident Hanoi has stripped a dissident of their nationality. He was forcibly exiled to Paris on 25 June 2017 after Vietnamese police surrounded his house at night two days earlier and took him away from his home. This move by the Vietnamese government was condemned by the international community with Phil Robertson from Human Rights Watch stating that Hanoi had "committed a blatantly illegal, rights violating act that deserves forceful, worldwide condemnation".

== See also ==
- Viet Tan
- Nguyen Quoc Quan
- Hong Vo
- Đặng Xuân Diệu
