= United Workers-Farmers Organization =

United Workers-Farmers Organization is a Vietnamese labor union unrecognized by the nation's communist government. It came to international attention in 2006 when authorities arrested its members in advance of an Asia-Pacific Economic Cooperation summit. Several of these members, including Doan Van Dien, his son Doan Huy Chuong, and the group's legal counsel Tran Quoc Hien, received sentences of four to five years' imprisonment for their activism on charges of "abusing democratic freedoms to infringe upon the interests of the state". Groups such as Human Rights Watch and Amnesty International have protested the sentences, the latter naming the imprisoned union members to be prisoners of conscience.
