= Vũ Thư =

Vũ Thư Xã Vũ Thư
- Commune
- Vũ Thư commune
- Location within Vietnam
- Coordinates: 20°26′09″N 106°17′25″E
- Country: Vietnam
- Region: Red River Delta
- Province: Hưng Yên
- Time zone: UTC+7 (UTC + 7)

Vũ Thư is a commune (xã) of Hưng Yên Province, Vietnam.

== Notable residents ==
- Trần Anh Kim: a former lieutenant colonel of the People's Army of Vietnam and pro-democracy activist.
