= Đoàn Huy Chương =

Vietnamese union leader and dissident

Doan Huy Chuong
- Occupation: Union activist
- Organization: United Workers-Farmers Organization
- Known for: 2007-11 imprisonment

Đoàn Huy Chương is a Vietnamese union leader imprisoned by the government of Vietnam. Amnesty International considers him a prisoner of conscience and has called for his release.

Chương was an activist with the United Workers-Farmers Organization, a labor union unrecognized by the Vietnamese government. In advance of an Asia-Pacific Economic Cooperation summit, authorities imprisoned all of the UWFO's members, including Đoàn Huy Chương and his father Đoàn Văn Điện. The group's legal consultant, Trần Quốc Hiền, was arrested the following January, two days after agreeing to become the group's spokesman. In December 2007, Đoàn Huy Chương and Đoàn Văn Điện were given prison sentences of four-and-a-half years apiece under penal code article 258, "abusing democratic freedoms to infringe upon the interests of the state." Authorities also accused them of slandering the Vietnamese government and spreading "reactionary" thinking. Their sentences have been protested by international human rights groups including Human Rights Watch and Amnesty International, which granted all of the arrested activists "prisoner of conscience" status and called for their immediate and unconditional release.

In Spring 2011, Boston's American Repertory Theater and System of a Down's Serj Tankian dedicated their production of Prometheus Bound to Đoàn Huy Chương, Đoàn Văn Điện, Trần Quốc Hiền, and seven other Amnesty International cases, stating in program notes that "by singing the story of Prometheus, the God who defied the tyrant Zeus by giving the human race both fire and art, this production hopes to give a voice to those currently being silenced or endangered by modern-day oppressors."
