= Hoàng Cơ Minh =

Vietnamese politician

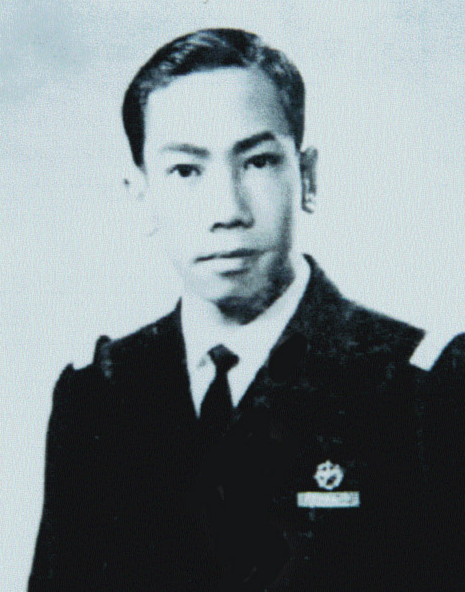
- Hoàng Cơ Minh as a young naval officer.
- Born: 20 June 1935; Hanoi, Tonkin, French Indochina
- Died: 28 August 1987 (aged 52); Attapeu Province, Laos
- Cause of death: Suicide
- Occupations: Commodore, politician
- Known for: First chairman of Việt Tân

Hoàng Cơ Minh (20 June 1935 – 28 August 1987) was the first chairman of the Vietnam Reform Revolutionary Party or Việt Tân. He was elected on 10 September 1982, when the Việt Tân was founded. Many Vietnamese expatriates consider him to have been a leader of the anti-communist resistance against the Vietnamese government.

== Biography ==
Hoàng Cơ Minh was born at Làng Vẽ in the village of Đông Ngạc, Từ Liêm District, Hà Đông Province (now part of Bắc Từ Liêm District of Hanoi) in 1935. His father Hoàng Huân Trung was the Provincial Education Commissioner of Hà Đông and Hanoi.

He graduated in mathematics from the Vietnam National University in 1954. In 1954, he was among the tide of northerners who went south to avoid communism. The following year, he joined the Republic of Vietnam Military Forces where he was a decorated officer. He was known as an incorruptible leader and was the youngest rear admiral in the Republic of Vietnam Navy. He rose quickly through the ranks, becoming a commodore-admiral.

After the Fall of Saigon in 1975, Hoàng Cơ Minh established the foundations for a long-term democracy movement against the Vietnamese communist regime. In 1982 he founded the Vietnam Reform Revolutionary Party or Việt Tân along the Laos–Thailand border and was elected as its first chairman. In their base in Thailand, the Việt Tân ordered its soldiers to call him Master Hoàng Cơ Minh (Thầy Hoàng Cơ Minh), as opposed to Uncle Hồ Chí Minh of the Communist Party of Vietnam.

He died in the forests of Laos in August 1987 while attempting to enter Vietnam.

=== Military career ===
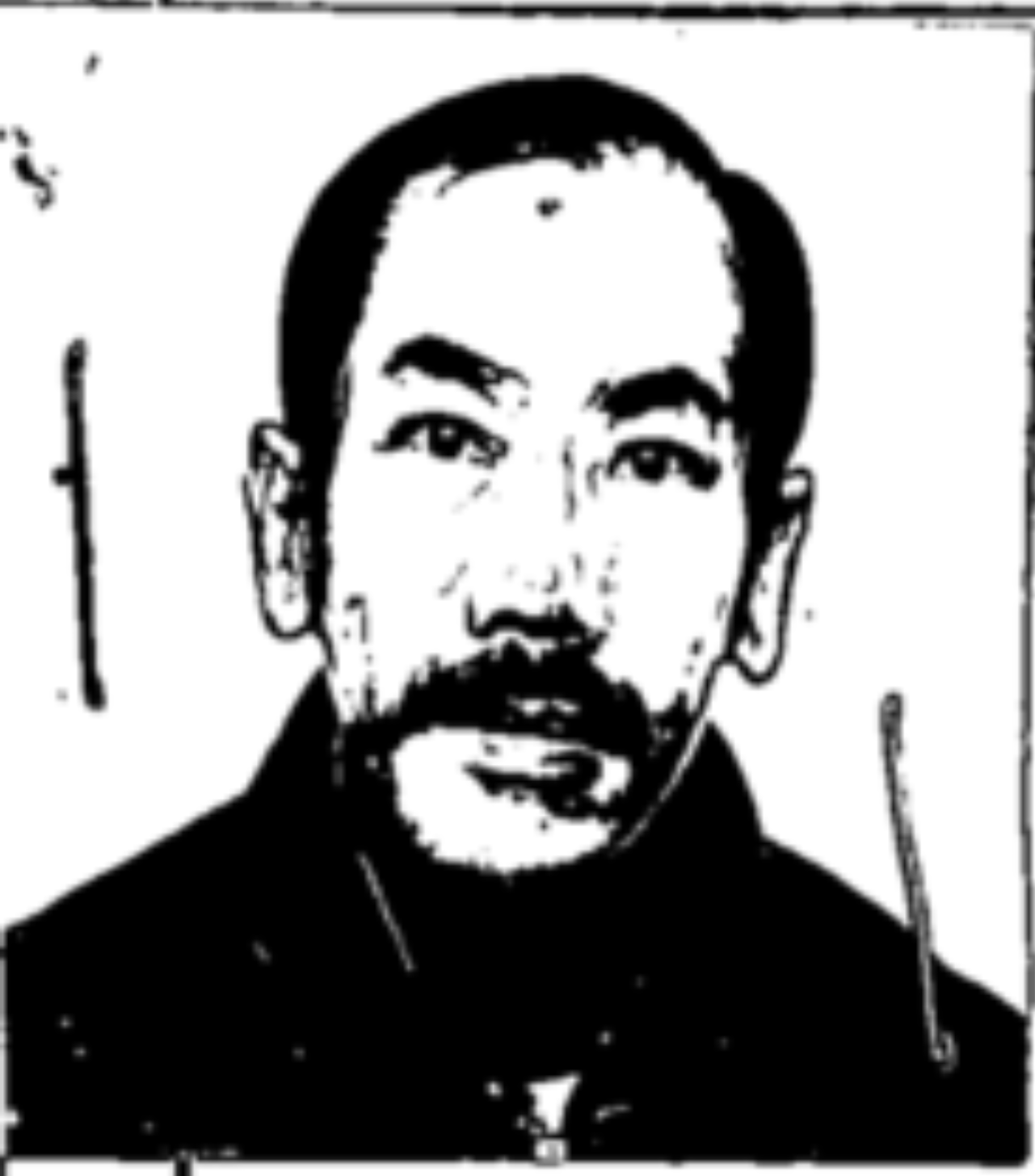
A United States federal government photograph of Hoàng Cơ Minh from 1981.

Hoàng Cơ Minh graduated from the South Vietnamese naval academy at Nha Trang and studied at the U.S. Naval Postgraduate School in Monterey, California. He quickly rose as a commander in the South Vietnamese riverine forces.

From 1964 to 1965, he served as defense attaché at the South Vietnamese embassy in Seoul, where he was instrumental in securing the diplomatic and military support of South Korea. Following his return to Vietnam, he held a series of naval commands. He was widely respected for his battlefield success and incorruptibility.

In 1974, he was promoted to rear admiral, becoming one of the youngest flag officers in the Republic of Vietnam Military Forces. In 1975 he commanded the 2nd Coastal Zone at Cam Ranh Naval Base. As North Vietnamese forces entered Saigon on April 30, 1975, Hoàng Cơ Minh's final act as a military officer was to lead a South Vietnamese naval flotilla out to sea to escort the first wave of "boat people" to freedom and to prevent the warships from falling into communist hands.

=== From political refugee to movement leader ===
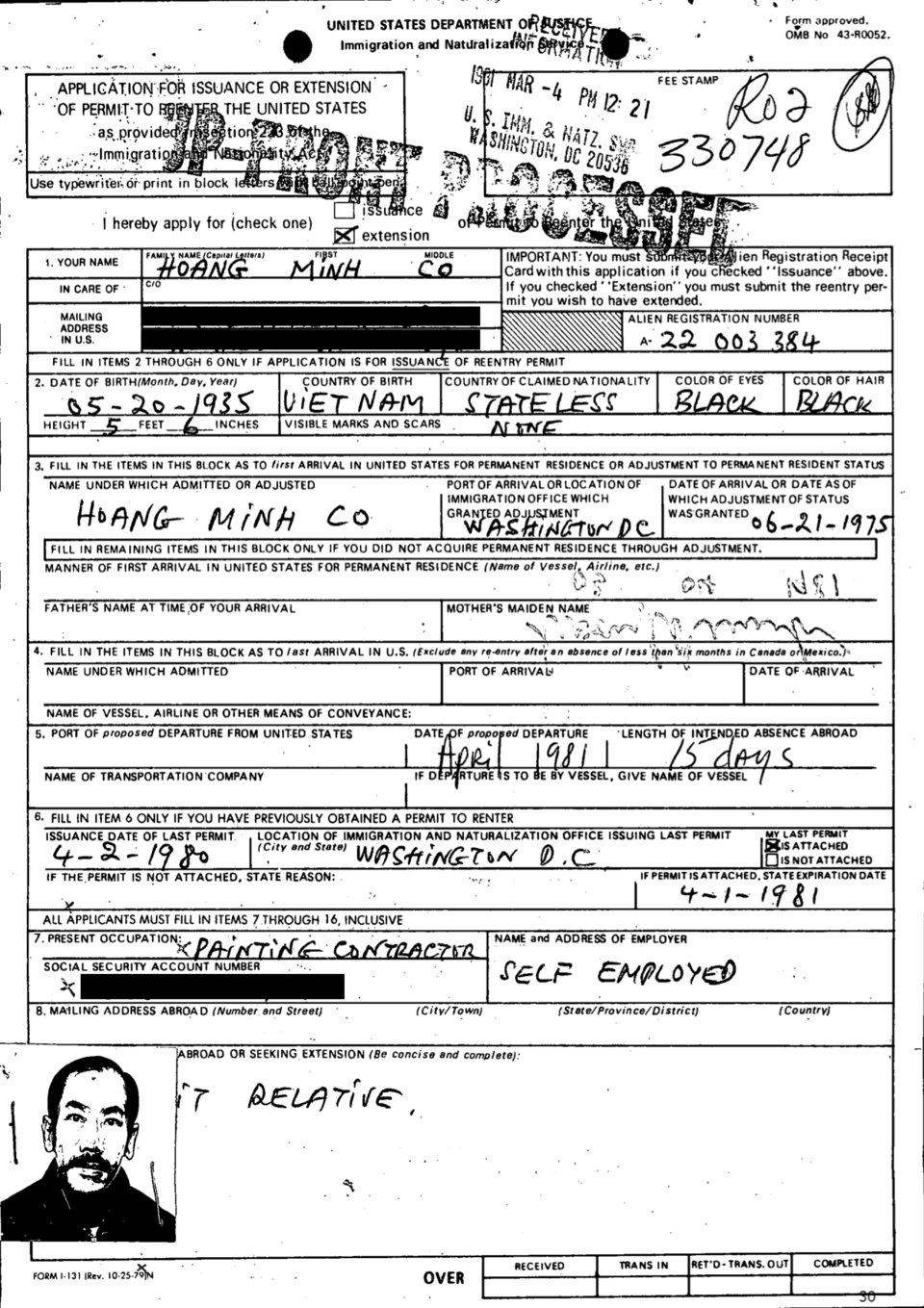
Hoàng Cơ Minh identified himself as "stateless" when he arrived in the United States.

Hoàng Cơ Minh and his family resettled in the Washington, D.C. area. Like most Vietnamese refugees in 1975, he was sponsored by an American family. Hoàng Cơ Minh's family was taken in by James Kelly, a Vietnam veteran and later senior national security official in the Ronald Reagan and George H. W. Bush administrations.

For the next several years, Hoàng Cơ Minh worked as a house painter during the day and focused his energies on organizing among the diaspora. He cofounded several political organizations aiming to promote freedom in Vietnam. From this network of overseas Vietnamese, a political movement took shape. It coalesced into Việt Tân with the mission of undertaking a revolutionary struggle to end dictatorship and reform the country.

Hoàng Cơ Minh advocated a self-reliant struggle based on the power of the Vietnamese people with the ultimate goal of rebuilding and modernizing the country. This ran contrary to much of the sentiment in the diaspora then which believed that outside support was absolutely essential for changing Vietnam and narrowly defined the struggle as overthrowing communism. The name of Việt Tân is based on the fusion of "Việt Nam" and "Canh Tân", which means comprehensive reform.

In 1981, Hoàng Cơ Minh met with Thai government officials and received their agreement to open offices along the border with Laos. From these operating bases, Vietnamese from the diaspora linked up with compatriots inside the country to build a pro-democracy movement on the ground. At Việt Tân's founding political conference in September 1982, Hoàng Cơ Minh was elected chairman. He spent most of his time in the malaria-infested jungle where he could be close to Vietnam and lead the movement.

The period of the 1980s was a challenging time for Vietnamese activists. The country was sealed off from the world and Vietnamese communist troops occupied both Laos and Cambodia. To travel to and from Vietnam, people would have to travel through the "killing fields" of Indochina. It was in that environment that Việt Tân members from the diaspora tried to link up with activists on the ground.

In summer 1987, Hoàng Cơ Minh led a group of 200 insurgents from Thailand to Vietnam in an operation known as “Eastward” (Đông Tiến). They were ambushed by communist troops along the way. Critically wounded, Hoàng Cơ Minh ended his life on August 28, 1987, less than 20 kilometers from the border with Vietnam.
