= Trần Anh Kim =

Vietnamese pro-democracy activist

Trần Anh Kim (born 15 August 1949) is a Vietnamese democracy activist and former lieutenant colonel in the People's Army of Vietnam. In 2006, he rose to prominence as a pro-democracy activist associated with Bloc 8406. Kim has been charged twice with attempting to overthrow the Vietnamese government, and since 2016 has been serving a 13-year prison sentence. He has been recognised as a prisoner of conscience by Amnesty International.

== Personal life ==
Kim was born on 15 August 1949 in Vũ Thư, Thái Bình province, in what was then North Vietnam. Until his imprisonment in 2016, Kim lived in Thái Bình with his wife, Nguyễn Thị Thợm.

== Military career ==
Kim served in the People's Army of Vietnam for over thirty years. In 1979, he was seriously injured during the Sino-Vietnamese War, suffering from head injuries while defending northern Vietnam from Chinese occupation by the People's Liberation Army. Kim attained the rank of lieutenant colonel and served as the deputy political commissar of the Military Committee of Thái Bình.

=== First and second arrests and first prison sentence ===
In 1991, Kim was arrested and charged with mishandling almost 100 million đồng of military funds, shortly before the 7th National Congress of the Communist Party of Vietnam; he was released without charge after the congress had concluded. Kim was arrested on the same charges in 1994 and was given a custodial prison sentence. He was released in 1995 and demoted to the rank of second-class soldier.

Kim vocally maintained his innocence and protested his sentence, and petitioned the government as well as the Supreme People's Court of Vietnam. Kim's rank was restored to a major in 1997, but his continued public criticism of his sentence led to him being ultimately expelled from the army without his entitlements, including his pension.

== Activism ==
In 2006, Kim became a member of Bloc 8406, a pro-democracy movement which called for democratic reforms to the Vietnamese political system. He went on to serve as the editor of the pro-democracy journal Tổ quốc. Kim campaigned for the rights of farmers whose lands had been seized by local authorities, and also took part in anti-corruption protests.

=== Third arrest and second prison sentence ===
In July 2009, Kim was arrested by police officers in Thái Bình on charges of being a member of the Democratic Party of Vietnam, a political organisation that had been banned by the Vietnamese government. He was charged with "carrying out activities that aim to overthrow the people's administration", in breach of article 79 of Vietnam's penal code. On 28 December 2009, Kim was sentenced to five years and six months in prison.

Kim was released in January 2015 to complete three years of probation; he was also placed under police surveillance. Shortly after his release, a group of 12 pro-democracy activists reported that they had been physically assaulted by police officers after visiting Kim at his home in the Trần Hưng Đạo ward of Thái Bình.

=== Fourth arrest and third prison sentence ===
On 21 September 2015, Kim was arrested and charged of breaching article 79 of the penal code for the second time. The evidence cited for the charges stemmed from Kim allegedly founding an organisation, Soldiers Raising the Flag of Democracy (Vietnamese: Lực lượng Quốc dân Dựng cờ Dân chủ), with authorities stated aimed to abolish the Communist Party of Vietnam to form a multi-party political system. Kim was tried alongside fellow activist Lê Thanh Tùng, who was allegedly the organisation's spokesperson.

During the trial, Kim and Lê both stated that the organisation consisted only of themselves and that it had at the point of their arrests been nothing more than an "idea" to form an association of former members of the People's Army of Vietnam and the former Army of the Republic of Vietnam. Their lawyers argued that the Constitution of Vietnam protected Kim and Lê's rights to free speech and association.

In December 2016, the People's Court of Thái Bình sentenced Kim to 13 years in prison; Lê was also found guilty. After initially serving his sentence in Ba Sao, Hà Nam province, as of August 2017 he is completing his sentence in prison no. 5 in Thanh Hóa province.

In May 2017, Kim and Lê's appeal of their sentence, on the grounds that their right to free speech and association had been breached, was rejected.

== Recognition ==
In 2009, Kim was awarded the Hellman Hammett grant from Human Rights Watch in recognition for his role as a "writer defending free expression".

Following Kim's sentence, the US ambassador to Vietnam, Ted Osius, raised concerns that his rights to freedom of expression and association had been breached.

In 2018, Kim was among 97 prisoners of conscience by Amnesty International. That same year, Defend the Defenders reported that Kim was experiencing poor health in prison, including prostate gland inflammation, and that his wife had raised concerns that he would not survive his sentence without the appropriate medical treatment.
