= Vi Đức Hồi =

- Born: c. 1957; Lạng Sơn Province, Vietnam
- Known for: Democracy activist and dissident
- Movement: Bloc 8406
- Spouse: Hoang Thi Tuoi

Vi Đức Hồi (born c. 1957) is an ethnically Tay Vietnamese democracy activist and former Communist Party official of Lạng Sơn Province. He was imprisoned in 2011 for advocating a multi-party system.

Hồi joined the Communist Party in 1980 and advanced to a high rank training other party leaders. In 2006, he began to advocate the adoption of a democratic system. The following year, he was stripped of his rank and expelled from the party. He later began blogging as a member of the pro-democracy Bloc 8406 network, writing commentaries about government land disputes and "general anti-corruption issues".

In 2008, he was briefly arrested for protesting the 2008 Summer Olympics torch relay. In the same year, he published a memoir entitled Facing Reality, My Path to Joining the Democratic Movement via the Internet. In it, he wrote: "The biggest loss for a human being is the loss of the right to be a human being; the biggest criminal is the one who robs others of human rights; the most pitiful person is the one who does not understand human rights; the one who deserves criticism most is the one who forgets human rights; the most cowardly person is the one who accepts the loss of human rights. I once deserved to be criticized and was once a coward."

In 2010, Hồi published a fictional version of the death of Nguyen Van Khuong, a young man reportedly beaten to death by police in Bac Giang province after a traffic stop. On 28 October of that year, he was arrested again, immediately ahead of an ASEAN summit. On 26 January 2011, he was sentenced to eight years' imprisonment for "spreading anti-government propaganda" for posting copies of pro-democracy articles online. As is the norm in Vietnam, the trial was closed to media. On 26 April, Hồi's sentence was reduced by an appeals court to five years in prison, followed by three years' house arrest.

Amnesty International designated Hồi a prisoner of conscience and called for his immediate release. The Committee to Protect Journalists also protested the sentence, calling on the government to release him. Front Line Defenders stated that the charges against Hồi were "a direct result of his legitimate and peaceful work as a democracy activist and in the defence of human rights".

In 2011, Human Rights Watch awarded him its Hellman/Hammett award, "recognizing writers who demonstrate courage and conviction in the face of political persecution".

Hồi is married to Hoang Thi Tuoi.
