= Bloc 8406 =

Outlawed political party in Vietnam

Bloc 8406 Khối 8406
- Founded: 8 April 2006
- Ideology: Liberal democracy

Bloc 8406 (Vietnamese: Khối 8406) is a small unified coalition of political groups in Vietnam that advocates for democratic reforms in Vietnam. It is named after the date of the group's Manifesto on Freedom and Democracy for Vietnam 2006 (Vietnamese: Tuyên Ngôn Tự Do Dân Chủ Cho Việt Nam 2006) declaring the need for democratic reforms in Vietnam. The manifesto was issued on 8 April 2006 and was signed by 118 dissidents calling for a multiparty nation.

== Notable Bloc 8406 members ==
Roman Catholic priest Nguyen Van Ly was sentenced to eight years in prison on March 30, 2007, for his support of the group's manifesto. He was released in 2011, but then he was returned to prison that same year.

Lawyer and labor activist Tran Quoc Hien was accused of being a part of Bloc 8406 in his 2007 trial that led to a five-year prison sentence for "endangering state security". He also posted articles critical to the government online, such as "The Tail", a description of life under plain clothes police monitoring.

Former Communist Party cadre Vi Duc Hoi joined the Bloc after leaving the party in 2007. He was imprisoned in 2011 for "spreading anti-government propaganda" after posting copies of pro-democracy articles online.

Trần Anh Kim was a founding member of Bloc 8406. In 2009, he was sentenced to five years in prison for allegedly attempting to overthrow the government; shortly after his release in 2015, he was arrested again on the same charges, and in 2016 was sentenced to 13 years in prison. Kim's sentence was criticised by the US State Department as well as Amnesty International, who recognised him as a prisoner of conscience.
