= Vietnam Populist Party =

Vietnam Populist Party Đảng Vì Dân
- Founded: 1 January 2006; 20 years ago
- Newspaper: Tập san Hoa-Mai
- Ideology: Populism; Liberal democracy
- National affiliation: Lac-Hong Coalition
- Slogan: Hòa bình - Tự do - Ấm no - Tiến bộ (Peace - Freedom - Prosperity - Progress)

Party flag

The Vietnam Populist Party (VPP), also known in Vietnamese as “Đảng Vì Dân” (lit. For the People Party), is a political party in Vietnam, formed on January 1, 2006. The party campaigns for democracy in Vietnam.

Vietnam is a one-party state. Despite the party's non-violent policies, it is still viewed as an illegal organization by the Vietnamese government.

== Organisation ==
The party was founded at the beginning of 2006, initially the result of a formation of five pro-democracy groups. The party introduced the New Vietnam Platform, which is a political roadmap with aims to form a multi-party government and democracy in Vietnam. The VPP's immediate goals are for a free and fair elections in the country, liberty, peace, prosperity and progressivity, which are all grouped under the New Vietnam Platform.

In 2007, the Vietnam Populist Party (VPP) and Vietnam Progression Party (VNPP) formed the Lac-Hong Coalition.

Several people have been arrested for their connections to the party. Hong Trung, the VPP's Representative in Vietnam, was arrested by Vietnam authorities in February 2007. Others include Truong Minh Duc, and student Dang Hung.

The whole platform had been evaluated by groups of pro-democracy movements inside Vietnam and overseas.

On April 28, 2010, the Vietnamese government announced the arrest of Phạm thị Phượng who is, according to the government, linked to this organization, for an attempt to bomb the Immaculate Conception Cathedral Basilica (Nha Tho Duc Ba) on April 30, 2010. The Vietnamese government considered VPP to be a terrorist organization.

== Structure ==
The VPP is organized as several independent chapters inside Vietnam for its security purposes.

According to the VPP's Liaison Office, due to the security issues in Vietnam, leaders and members of the party in Vietnam are currently keep their identities confidential from public.

VPP's liaison office in Houston, Texas is its only public contact.

== Objectives ==
VPP’s immediate goal is a free and fair general election in Vietnam.

VPP’s legitimate goal is to build a new nation of Vietnam which offers peace, liberty, prosperity and progressivity.

The New Vietnam Platform is an elaborate and systematic plan of action, includes two schemes, and aimed at two main goals:

Scheme #1: Aimed to form a multi-party government; by campaigning for A Free and Fair Election in Vietnam. Our "Road Map To Democracy for Vietnam" is a proposal of political solutions for Vietnam, based on non-violent campaigns.

The DVD's Road Map to Democracy offers solutions for how to democratize the country under two scenarios: with the Vietnamese Communist Party is still in power, with the regime collapsed due to sudden political incidents or popular uprising.

The Road Map also offers tentative plans for transitional period, aimed to prevent bloodshed and social crisis.

Scheme #2: Aimed to transform Vietnam into a new country, which offers democracy, liberty, prosperity and progressives. All collective ideas formed under a proposal called "National Platform for A New Vietnam". The whole platform had been evaluated by groups of pro-democracy movements inside Vietnam and overseas as well.

== Programs ==
=== Radio Hoa Mai ===
Radio Hoa-Mai is based in Southern California, dedicated to promote human rights and democracy in Vietnam.

Radio Hoa-Mai formed in February 2005, started with Webcast broadcasting program.

In May 2005, Radio Hoa-Mai contracted with KHWR Corp., an international radio broadcasting provider, expanded its Vietnamese language service with a shortwave program, broadcasts two days a week to Vietnam. The radio broadcasting programs serve the mass of millions Vietnamese with majority in rural areas.

In February 2006, the program extended to three days a week, consisting of pro-democracy news, educational of human rights and democracy, and commentary on non-violent campaigns for democracy in Vietnam. It also relays voices of the oppressed people to the world via webcast programs, and broadcast back to Vietnam via shortwave programs as well.

All broadcast programs are archived for public access at www.RadioHoaMai.com.

Radio Hoa-Mai is privately funded by democracy advocates, and operated by a group of young professionals and volunteers in the United States of America. The studio of Radio Hoa-Mai is currently located in Houston, Texas.

Radio Hoa-Mai currently has two Vietnamese language programs. The specific purposes of the shortwave radio program are:

- Helping victims of oppressions, labor abuses, corruptions, etc. to raise awareness of the corrupted system in Vietnam.
- Promoting democracy as well as help spread news about activities campaigning for a free Vietnam inside Vietnam and overseas as well.
- Supporting all efforts of fighting against human trafficking and children sex slaves.
- Campaigning for a peaceful political solution for Vietnam, especially a Free and Fair National Election in Vietnam, to pave a way for forming a democratic government without a bloodshed.
- Introducing policy, roadmap to democracy and plans of the Vietnam Populist Party (VPP) to help building Vietnam afterward.

== Timelines ==
- 1/2006: Vietnam Populist Party formed by five pro-democracy groups.
- 1/2006: Vietnam Populist Party introduced the New Vietnam Platform, its initial political platform.
- 1/2006: Vietnam Populist Party announced its plan to openly campaign for democracy in Vietnam, with a temporarily contact office in Huế.
- 2/2007: Vietnam Populist Party (VPP) and Vietnam Progression Party (VNPP) formed Lac-Hong Coalition.
- 2/2007: Rev. Hong Trung, VPP’s representative in Vietnam, arrested by Vietnamese authorities.
- 5/2007: Journalist Truong Minh Duc, a VPP member, arrested by Vietnam authority in Kiên Giang province.
- 7/2007: Student Dang Hung, a VPP member, arrested by Vietnam authority in Bình Dương province.

=== Hoa Mai Newsletters ===
Hoa-Mai Newsletters (Tập san Hoa-Mai) is a non-commercial prints, published monthly inside Vietnam, and on the VPP’s websites. Hoa-Mai Newsletters publishes articles about VPP’s policy and its activities. It also introduces pro-democracy articles and researches.
