= Lý Thái Hùng =

Vietnamese chairman

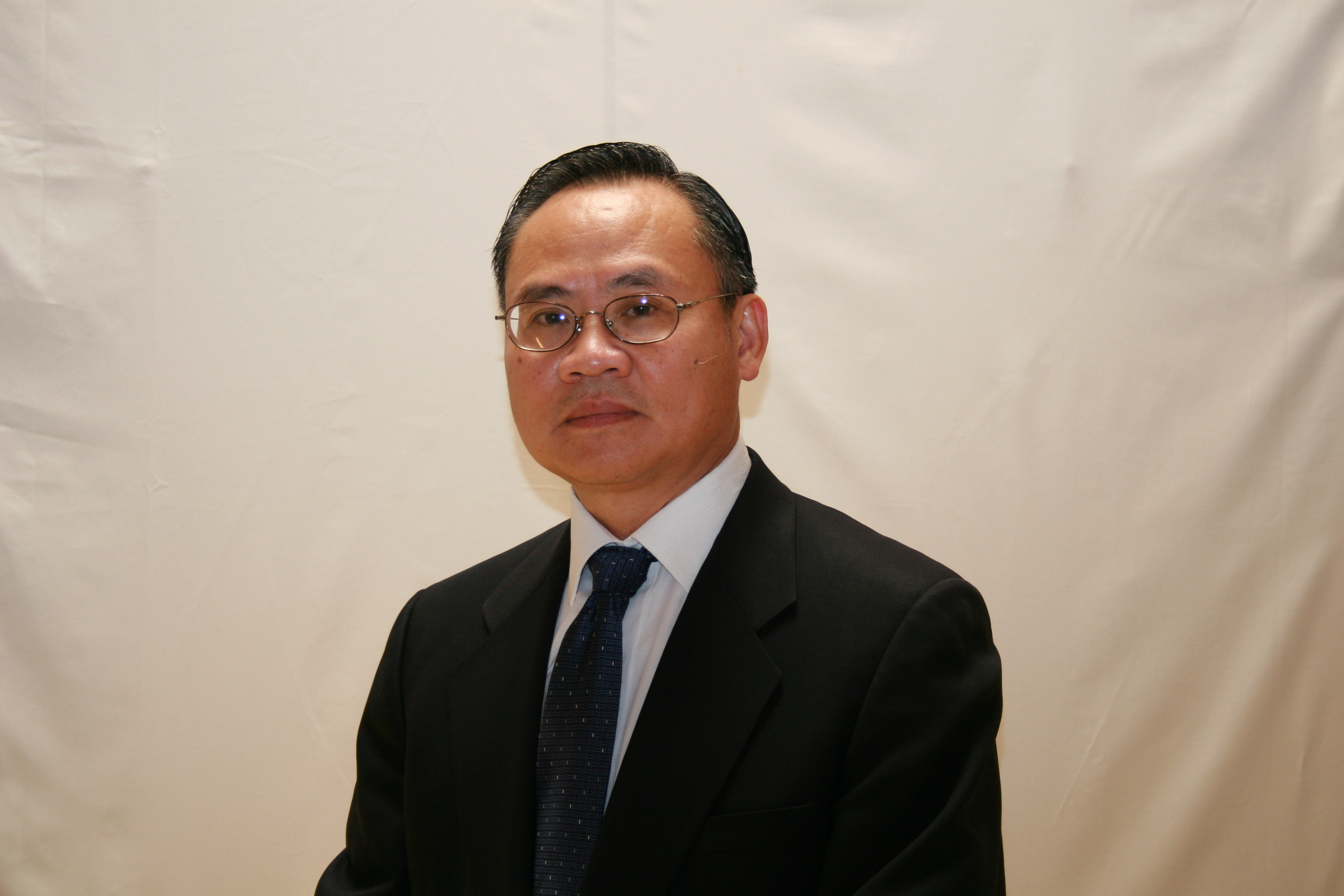
Chairman of Việt Tân, Lý Thái Hùng

Lý Thái Hùng is the current chairman of Việt Tân. He was elected in September 2022 at the 9th Party Congress.

== Life ==
Lý Thái Hùng obtained a Masters in Civil Engineering in Japan in 1979.

In the late 1970s, Lý Thái Hùng was a member of the Organization of Free Vietnamese, one of the first overseas Vietnamese pro-democracy organizations after the fall of Saigon. During the same period, addressing the main issue of the Vietnamese boat people, Lý Thái Hùng worked with different Japanese human rights organizations and political associations to rescue and to provide help to the refugees. The Refugees Relief Association that he founded still operates today.

== Việt Tân ==
Lý Thái Hùng joined the Việt Tân in 1982 and has held various leadership positions since then. In 1993 he was appointed Deputy Secretary of the Overseas Party Branch. In 2001 he was elected General Secretary of the Party and at the 6th Congress of the Party in September 2006 he was re-elected for the 2006-2011 term.

In October 2007 on a trip through Europe, he met with Polish journalist Robert Krzyston, one of the leaders of The Committee for Freedom of Speech in Poland, a pro-democracy organization with members being mostly intellectuals and reporters. While in Warsaw, Mr. Hung appeared on Radio Warsaw FM 106 to discuss the democracy movement in Vietnam. The trip concluded with a meeting with Dr. Bogdan Borusewicz, Chairman of the Polish Senate.

== Publications ==
Lý Thái Hùng is also author of the book Eastern Europe in Vietnam (in Vietnamese), published in 2006.

== See also ==
- Việt Tân
