= Hồ Đức Hoà =

Community organizer and journalist

- Born: 1974 (age 51–52)
- Occupation: Community organizer
- Known for: democracy activism, 2011 detention

Hồ Đức Hoà (born 1974) is a community organizer and journalist who has been arrested in Vietnam and sentenced to 13 years in prison in 2013.

== 2011 Arrest ==
Hồ Đức Hoà is known for being a contributing journalist for the Vietnam Redemptorist News and for actively mobilizing access to education for children living in poverty and assistance to typhoon victims and people living with disabilities. Hoà was arrested on July 30, 2011 at Tan Son Nhat Airport along with Dang Xuan Dieu and Nguyen Van Oai upon their return to Vietnam. They were detained on unspecified charges under Article 79 which outlines activities aimed at overthrowing the government. This was the first in a series of arrests during the 2011 crackdown on Vietnamese youth activists.

== 2013 Conviction ==
A trial was held on January 8 and 9 by the People's Court of Nghệ An Province for 14 social activists, including Paulus Lê Sơn and Hoà. All human rights defenders were sentenced to 3 to 13 years in charges of subversion. During the court case, Hoà was accused of involved in a training session organised by Viet Tan, a US-based pro-democracy organization to establish democracy and reform Vietnam through peaceful and political means. Along with Dang Xuan Dieu and Paulus Le Son, Hoà was convicted to 13 years in prison followed by 5 years in house arrest. During the following appeal trial, Hoà's sentence remain unchanged.

== International Response ==
Hoà's arrest sparked immediate uproar from various NGO's and Members of Congress including Human Rights Watch which described it as a "new blot on the country’s already problematic record on freedom of religion". The Embassy of the United States in Vietnam said that they were "deeply troubled" following the conviction of the activists over the two-day trial.

Stanford Law School's Allen Weiner filed a petition to the United Nations Working Group for Arbitrary Detention (UNGWAD) on behalf of the families of the detained activists including Hoà in July 2012. On November 28, 2013 the UNWGAD ruled in favour of the petition by Weiner, ruling the detention to be arbitrary and unlawful while condemning the treatment of the 16 social and political activists.

== See also ==
- Human rights in Vietnam
- 2011 crackdown on Vietnamese youth activists
- Dang Xuan Dieu
- Paulus Le Son
- Ta Phong Tan
