= Brad Adams =

American activist

Brad Adams is an American lawyer and the founder and executive director at Climate Rights International. Prior to that, he was the executive director of the Asia Division of Human Rights Watch from 2002–2022. Adams established what would become the East Bay Community Law Center, where he worked as a legal aid attorney.

== Early life and education ==
Adams was an All-CIF baseball and basketball player in high school at Montclair Prep in Van Nuys, California. He was CIF basketball Player of the Year in 1977. Adams later played basketball professionally for London Docklands.

Adams has a Master of Science in European Studies from the London School of Economics and a bachelor of arts in Economics from Pepperdine University, where he played baseball. He graduated from the University of California, Berkeley, School of Law.

== Career ==
Adams spent five years in Cambodia as the senior lawyer for the Cambodian field office of the United Nations High Commissioner for Human Rights and as legal advisor to the Cambodian parliament’s human rights committee. Then, Adams was the executive director of the Asia Division of Human Rights Watch from 2002–2022, overseeing investigations, advocacy and media work in twenty countries. Adams has worked on issues including the protection of civil society, human rights defenders, and environmental activists; freedom of expression, association, assembly, and information; media freedom; political prisoners; women’s rights; children’s rights; land rights; labor rights; refugees and migrants; international justice; and armed conflict. Adams founded Climate Rights International, where he is executive director.

Adams founded the Berkeley Community Law Center (now the East Bay Community Law Center), where he worked as a legal aid lawyer, focusing on housing, homelessness, and public benefits. He received a grant from the Berkeley Law Foundation to start the law center. He occasionally teaches international human rights law at the University of California, Berkeley, School of Law.
