= 2011 crackdown on Vietnamese youth activists =

Arrests of Vietnamese Christian activists

Between July 2011 and December 2011 a number of young Vietnamese Christian activists, primarily located in northern province of Nghệ An, Vietnam, and working with the Congregation of the Most Holy Redeemer, were arrested by the Vietnamese government for protesting for land rights and circulating a petition to free prominent legal rights activist Cu Huy Ha Vu, a prominent human rights defender who was imprisoned for seven years in April 2011.

Among them was 26-year-old high-profile blogger Paulus Le Son.

Four of them, Dau Van Duong, Tran Huu Duc, Chu Manh Son, and Hoang Phong had already been tried, allegedly for distributing pro-democracy leaflets and sentenced under Article 88 to two to three years in jail. Fourteen other activists were sentenced to 3 to 15 years in prison after a two-day trial on 8–9 January 2013.

== Activists ==
During the original wave in July and August 2011, 17 original activists have been arrested.

Name	Age at time of arrest	Hometown	Date of Arrest	Trial	Verdict
Dang Xuan Dieu	32	Vinh City	30 July 2011	8–9 January 2013	13 years prison term
Ho Duc Hoa	37	Vinh City	30 July 2011	8–9 January 2013	13 years prison term
Nguyen Van Oai	31	Vinh City	30 July 2011	8–9 January 2013	3 years prison term, 2 years house arrest
Chu Manh Son	22	Nghệ An Province	2 August 2011	24 May 2012	26 months in prison
Dau Van Duong	23	Nghệ An Province	2 August 2011	24 May 2012	42 months in prison
Tran Huu Duc	23	Nghệ An Province	2 August 2011	24 May 2012	39 months in prison
Paulus Le Son	26	Thanh Hóa Province	3 August 2011	8–9 January 2013	13 years prison term, 5 years of house arrest
Nong Hung Anh	23	Lạng Sơn	5 August 2011	8–9 January 2013	5 years prison term, 3 years house arrest
Nguyen Van Duyet	31	Vinh City	7 August 2011	8–9 January 2013	6 years prison term, 4 years house arrest
Nguyen Xuan Anh	29	Vinh City	7 August 2011	8–9 January 2013	3 years prison term, 2 years house arrest
Ho Van Oanh	26	Vinh City	16 August 2011	8–9 January 2013	3 years prison term, 2 years house arrest
Thai Van Dung	24	Nghệ An Province	19 August 2011	8–9 January 2013	5 years prison term, 3 years house arrest
Tran Minh Nhat	23	Lâm Đồng Province	27 August 2011	8–9 January 2013	4 years prison term, 3 years house arrest
Ta Phong Tan	43	Bạc Liêu Province	5 September 2011	24 September 2012	10 years prison term
Tran Vu Anh Binh	37	Unknown	19 September 2011	30 October 2012	6 years prison term, 2 years house arrest
Nguyen Dinh Cuong	31	Nghệ An Province	24 December 2011	8–9 January 2013	4 years prison term, 3 years house arrest
Hoang Phong	24	Nghệ An Province	29 December 2011	24 May 2012	2 years of probation

== Arrest ==
Reporters Without Borders reported on the arrest of the Catholic blogger Paulus Le Son and the major police operation targeting around 10 Catholics in August 2011. Paulus Le Son was arrested at his home on 3 August 2011 around 11:30am. Police blocked the road as he returned home on his motorcycle, deliberately causing him to fall. Four police officers then lifted him by his hands and feet and tossed him into a police car.

Dang Xuan Dieu, 32, and Ho Duc Hoa, 37 were detained on 30 July at Tan Son Nhat airport in Ho Chi Minh City.

The activists' families have tried to visit the activists in prisons multiple times, but were denied visits.

== 2012 Trials for Article 88 ==
On 24 May 2012, a trial was held for Dau Van Duong, Tran Huu Duc, Chu Manh Son, and Hoang Phong who were arrested under Article 88 of Vietnam's Penal Code, "conducting propaganda against the Socialist Republic of Vietnam". The four from Nghệ An were arrested for distributing leaflets.

They were convicted of propaganda against the state and sentenced by the People's Court of Nghệ An in Vietnam to two to three and a half years of imprisonment. The four were denied access to legal counsel until just before the trial. Of the four, one was arrested in December 2011, while the other three had been awaiting trial since their arrests in August 2011. Only after protesting outside were families and supporters of the four were allowed into the courtroom.

On 24 September 2012, Ta Phong Tan and two other bloggers Nguyen Van Hai and Phan Thanh Hai were convicted by the People's Court of Ho Chi Minh City. In the same year, another trial was held for Tran Vu Anh Binh and Viet Khang, another dissident musician on 30 October.

== 2013 Trial for Article 79 ==
On 8 and 9 January 2013, a trial was held by the People's Court of Nghệ An Province for 14 of democracy activists, including Dang Ngoc Minh, Dang Xuan Dieu, Ho Duc Hoa, Ho Van Oanh, Paulus Le Son, Nguyen Dang Minh Man, Nguyen Dang Vinh Phuc, Nguyen Dinh Cuong, Nguyen Van Duyet, Nguyen Van Oai, Nguyen Xuan Oanh, Nong Hung Anh, Thai Van Dung, and Tran Minh Nhat.

They were accused of maintaining ties with Viet Tan, a US-based pro-democracy organization to establish democracy and reform Vietnam through peaceful and political means. The verdict was announced by Judge Tran Ngoc: All of them were sentenced to 3–13 years in prison on charges violating Clause 1 of Article 79 of the Vietnamese criminal code for organizing "to attempt to overthrow the government". At the trial, Paulus Le Son was the only one not to have acknowledged any wrongdoings.

During the trial, a large number of police were deployed around the court, with police detaining a number of other bloggers who attempted to attend the trial.

== International response ==
Shortly after the arrest wave, Human Rights Watch released a press statement on 30 September 2011 calling for the immediate release of Dang Xuan Dieu, Ho Duc Hoa, Nguyen Van Duyet, Nong Hung Anh and Paulus Le Son and a dismissal of their charges.

The Committee to Protect Journalists, CPJ, is alarmed by the arrest and recent crackdown on freedom of express in Vietnam and calls on the government to immediately release all of the journalists detained in the country.

On 3 October 2011, Bob Bietz, CPJ's Asia program director stated, "With these arrests, Vietnam now ranks among the worst jailers of journalists in the world. The crackdown under way underscores the Communist Party government's enduring fear of an independent press scrutinizing its record, policies, and personalities. The national security-related charges used to imprison these journalists are bogus across the board."

On 13 December 2011, Congresswoman Susan Davis, representing the California 53rd District and a member of the Vietnam Caucus in Congress spoke on the Congress floor on behalf of Paulus Le Son and 14 other arrested Vietnamese youth activists. Davis stated, "I call on my colleagues to stand side-by-side with these brave individuals and raise their voice in demanding that the Government of Vietnam release all prisoners of conscience and uphold their commitment to human rights for all."

On 12 March 2012, Media Legal Defence Initiative and eight other NGOs issued a joint letter to the Vietnamese Prime Minister Nguyen Tan Dung calling for the immediate release of bloggers Dang Xuan Dieu, Ho Duc Hoa, Nguyen Van Duyet, Nong Hung Anh and Paulus Le Son. The letter states, "There are no grounds for such charges against any of the five. Mr. Dieu is an engineer and community organizer. Mr. Hoa is also a community organizer, Mr. Duyet is the President of the Association of Catholic Workers of Vinh, and Mr. Anh is a student at Hanoi University. Mr. Son is a blogger. All are active contributors to prominent citizen journalist sites, including Vietnam Redemptorist News (VRNs)."

On 22 May 2012, Human Rights Watch issued a second press release calling the immediate release of the four Catholic activists accused of Article 88. "It's absolutely shameful that the Vietnam government is putting these Catholic activists on trial, and may send them to prison for years for nothing more than expressing their views and distributing leaflets", said Phil Robertson, deputy Asia director at Human Rights Watch.

Following the 2013 trial, Brad Adams, Asia director of Human Rights Watch, condemned the arrest and calls for the "convictions to be squashed immediately". He states "The conviction of yet more peaceful activists is another example of a government that is increasingly afraid of the opinions of its own people. Instead of imprisoning critics, the Vietnamese government should be honoring them for their efforts to address the myriad problems facing the country that the government itself has also identified."

Phil Robertson, the deputy director of the Asia division of Human Rights Watch, also followed up with "this was the largest group to be brought to trial together in recent times."

Other human rights organizations have called this the "largest subversion to be brought in years" in Vietnam.
