= Allen Weiner =

American academic

Allen S. Weiner
- Education: Harvard University; Stanford Law School (JD)
- Employer: Stanford University
- Known for: Was the inaugural Warren Christopher Professor of the Practice of International Law and Diplomacy at Stanford Law School (2003–07)
- Notable work: International Law, with Barry E. Carter and Phillip R. Trimble, July 2007; Choice of limits, limits of choice: Argentina, Australia, and the process of political change, 1985
- Title: Senior Lecturer, and co-director of the Stanford Program in International and Comparative Law and the Stanford Center on International Conflict and Negotiation.
- Awards: State Department Superior Honor Award, 1992 (individual); Federal Bar Association Younger Federal Lawyer Award, 1997; Honorable Mention, Associated Students of Stanford University Teacher of the Year Award, 2006

Allen S. Weiner is an American academic who is a senior lecturer in international law at Stanford Law School.

Weiner is also the co-director of the Stanford Program in International and Comparative Law and the Stanford Center on International Conflict and Negotiation. He was formerly a Stanford Professor of International Law. He also teaches for undergraduates, working with Scott Sagan on the popular "Face of Battle" and "Rules of War" courses, which introduce topics of military history and the law of armed conflict.

== Awards ==
- U.S. State Department Superior Honor Award, 1992 (individual), 1995 (group), 1999 (group)
- Federal Bar Association Younger Federal Lawyer Award, 1997
- Honorable Mention, Associated Students of Stanford University Teacher of the Year Award, 2006

== Select works ==
- International Law, with Barry E. Carter and Phillip R. Trimble, Aspen Publishers, 5th ed., July 2007
- Allen S. Weiner, "Hamdan, Terror, War", 11 Lewis & Clark Law Review 997 (2007).
- Allen S. Weiner, "Law, Just War, and the International Fight Against Terrorism: Is it War?", in Intervention, Terrorism, and Torture: Challenges to Just War Theory in the 21st Century, Stephen Lee, ed., Berlin: Springer Press, 2007.
- Allen S. Weiner, "The Use of Force and Contemporary Security Threats: Old Medicine for New Ills?", 59 Stanford Law Review 415 (2006).
- Choice of limits, limits of choice: Argentina, Australia, and the process of political change, Harvard University, 1985
