= Đặng Xuân Diệu =

Vietnamese community mobiliser, activist

Dang Xuan Dieu
- Đặng Xuân Diệu
- Born: July 8, 1979 (age 46)
- Occupation: Engineer
- Known for: Democracy activism, 2011 arrest, 2013 conviction

Đặng Xuân Diệu is a Vietnamese community mobiliser, activist and prominent member of the Catholic church. He was arrested in Vietnam on 30 July 2011, convicted over a two-day trial in January 2013 and sentenced to 13 years in prison. Diệu was released and exiled to France on 12 January 2017.

== 2011 arrest ==
An engineer known for being a citizen journalist and social activist, Diệu was arrested on July 30, 2011, at Tan Son Nhat Airport along with Hồ Đức Hoà and Nguyễn Văn Oai upon their return to Vietnam. This was the first in a series of arrests during the 2011 crackdown on Vietnamese youth activists.

== 2013 conviction ==
On January 8–9, 2013, a trial was held by the People's Court of Nghệ An Province for 14 democracy activists, mostly Catholics, one of which was Đặng Xuân Diệu. All of them were sentenced to 3–13 years in prison on charges of subversion. During the court case, Đặng Xuân Diệu was accused of participating in a training of Viet Tan, a US-based pro-democracy organization to establish democracy and reform Vietnam through peaceful and political means. Diệu has said of the allegations against him, "I have done nothing contrary to my conscience, so although the authorities may punish me physically and impose a severe sentence upon me, the government is only thereby trampling on the eternal good morals of the Vietnamese nation, which as its affair is a matter for which it must bear responsibility."

== International response ==
Đặng Xuân Diệu's conviction sparked international outcry from elected representatives and NGOs including the Center for Public Justice which described the sentencing as "outrageous lengths that Vietnamese authorities are willing to go to to suppress independent reporting." The United States Embassy in Hanoi also released a statement which conveyed that it was "deeply troubled" by the convictions and called them "part of a disturbing human rights trend in Vietnam."

Following reports of abuse and mistreatment while arbitrarily detained, activists in Vietnam and around the world have started a grassroots campaign in support of Đặng Xuân Diệu. Efforts include several NGO's issuing a joint letter calling to "cease the ill-treatment, physical and psychological abuse of Đặng Xuân Diệu while in arbitrary detention" as well as the release of Diệu. Allen Weiner of Stanford Law School also filed an update to the petition to the United Nations Working Group on Arbitrary Detention (UNWGAD) in which the detention of 16 Catholic youth was ruled arbitrary and unlawful, regarding the accounts of assault Diệu has faced in prison. Various Swiss elected representatives have also visited the Vietnamese Consul in Geneva to bring attention to Diệu's case.

On October 27, 2014, many organisations had expressed their concern for Đặng Xuân Diệu and his mistreatment in prison. Together, they released a letter calling for his immediate and unconditional release. These organisations include English PEN, ACAT France, Electronic Frontier Foundation, PEN International, Media Legal Defence Initiative and Viet Tan.

== 2017 release ==
On 13 January 2017, Đặng Xuân Diệu was finally released from prison after six years of arbitrary detention and sent to Paris. This followed pressure from the EU, human rights groups, elected officials and the Vietnamese community around the globe.

Allen Weiner of Stanford Law School, who serves as Diệu's international lawyer, stated: "It is gratifying that Mr. Đặng Xuân Diệu has at last been released from prison. Mr. Diệu should never have been imprisoned; his arrest and imprisonment for engaging in peaceful political expression violated settled international human rights standards that Vietnam itself has accepted, as well as Vietnam's own constitution. Mr. Diệu has suffered terribly for engaging in forms of political expression routinely practiced in democratic states all over the world. At the same time, his release highlights the limits of the Vietnamese government's repressive power. It shows how the actions of civil society movements, international organizations, and governments around the world that support human rights can help defend the human rights of Vietnam's citizens."

Viet Tan's chairman, Do Hoang Diem, also stated: "We would like to thank Professor Allen Weiner, the EU, and every human rights organization and activist who has campaigned for Đặng Xuân Diệu. While Diệu should never have been arrested in the first place or exiled from his home country, we are comforted that his ordeal is now over and that he can receive much needed medical attention."

== See also ==
- 2011 crackdown on Vietnamese youth activists
- 2013 Conviction of 14 Vietnamese Dissidents
- Hồ Đức Hoà
- Nguyễn Văn Đài
