= Paulus Lê Sơn =

Paulus Le Son is a Vietnamese blogger, member of the Catholic Church and dissident who was arrested in Vietnam in 2011 and sentenced to 13 years in prison in 2013.

== 2011 arrest ==
Son was previously arrested in April 2011 trying to attend the trial of well-known cyber-dissident Cu Huy Ha Vu. On 2 August 2011, Son was trying to attend a hearing on Cu Huy Ha Vu's appeal against Vu's seven-year jail sentence. The next morning, on 3 August 2011 at around 11:30am policed blocked the road around his home in Thanh Hóa Province, and deliberately caused him to fall from his motorcycle as he was coming home. Four police officers dragged him into a police car.

The arrest happened during the 2011 crackdown on Vietnamese youth activists which included 17 other Vietnamese youth activists.

== 2013 conviction ==
On 9 January 2013, a trial was held by the People's Court of Nghệ An Province for 14 democracy activists, including Son. All of them were sentenced to 3–13 years in prison on charges of subversion. During the court case, Son was accused of participating in a Viet Tan meeting. During the trial, Son was the only defendant of the 14 not to have acknowledged any wrongdoings. Police also detained a number of other bloggers who attempted to attend the trial.

== International response ==
Reporters Without Borders quickly condemned the arrest in 2011 and called for his immediate release. In a statement, the organization states that "We are appalled by the brutality of Son's arrest, which has all the hallmarks of a police kidnapping"

Following the 2013 trial, Brad Adams, Asia director of Human Rights Watch, condemned the arrest and calls for the "convictions to be squashed immediately". He states "The conviction of yet more peaceful activists is another example of a government that is increasingly afraid of the opinions of its own people. Instead of imprisoning critics, the Vietnamese government should be honoring them for their efforts to address the myriad problems facing the country that the government itself has also identified."

Following the 2013 trial and conviction, Reporters Without Borders quickly emerged and stated that it is "appalled at the groundless verdict handed down" that day and that it is the position to prove his innocence. The statement also reads that the group "has proof that the Vietnamese authorities use false pretexts to convict bloggers that criticize them".

== See also ==
- 2011 crackdown on Vietnamese youth activists
- 2013 conviction of 14 Vietnamese dissidents
