= Việt Tân =

Political reform organization

Vietnam Reform Revolutionary Party Việt Nam Canh tân Cách mạng Đảng
- Abbreviation: Việt Tân
- Chairman: Lý Thái Hùng
- Spokesperson: Hà Đông Xuyến
- Founder: Hoàng Cơ Minh
- Founded: 10 September 1982
- Banned: 4 October 2016
- Headquarters: San Jose, California, U.S.
- Newspaper: Vietnam Today
- Ideology: Reformism; Liberalism; Liberal democracy; Vietnamese nationalism; Classical pluralism; Anti-communism
- Slogan: English: "Ending the dictatorship – Renovating the country"; Vietnamese: "Chấm dứt độc tài – Canh tân đất nước"
- National Assembly: 0 / 500 (Banned in Vietnam)

Party flag

Website
- viettan.org/en/

The Vietnam Reform Revolutionary Party (Vietnamese: Việt Nam Canh tân Cách mạng Đảng) or the Việt Tân (lit. 'the New Việt') is a political party with members inside and outside of Vietnam. The organization describes itself as a movement that aims to "establish liberal democracy and reform Vietnam through peaceful and political means".

Việt Tân was founded by exiled members of the deposed Saigon government in the aftermath of the Vietnam War on September 10, 1982. Its operations remained underground for two decades until September 19, 2004, when then-chairman, Nguyễn Kim, introduced Việt Tân to the public.

Việt Tân is listed as a terrorist organization in Vietnam. The validity of this designation has been disputed by numerous human rights groups and foreign governments. The U.S. government has also stated that there is 'no evidence' that it is a terrorist organization.

The current executive director is Hoang Tu Duy.

== Objectives ==
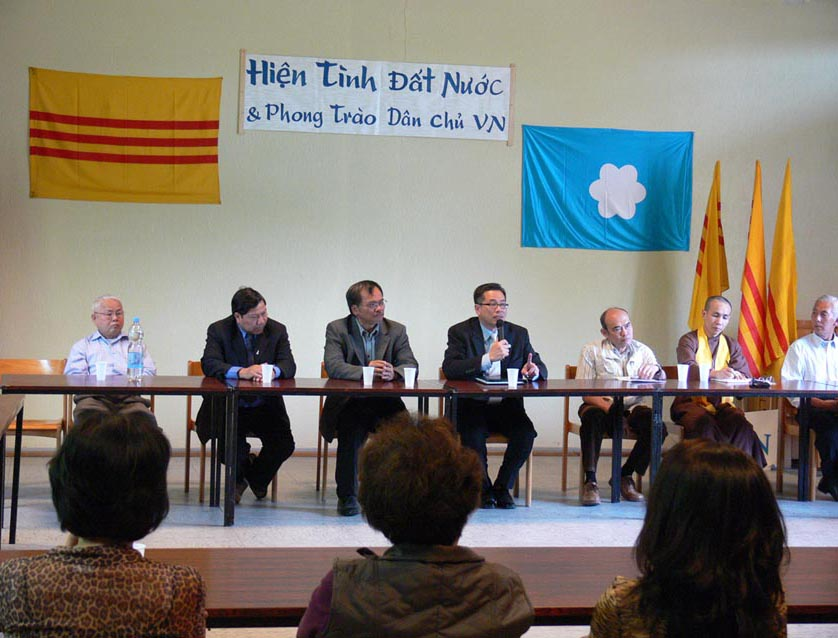
Chairman Đỗ Hoàng Điềm at the political seminar in Krefeld, 2010

Việt Tân aims to establish democracy and reform Vietnam through peaceful means, focusing on empowering the Vietnamese people, claiming to support the development of civil society, and promoting pluralism in Vietnam. Việt Tân sees the "strength and resources of the Vietnamese people" as the "impetus for achieving political change and restoring civil rights."

=== Violent Start ===
Việt Tân traces roots to anti-communist armed resistance movements formed after the Vietnam War. Its founder and chairman at the time, Hoàng Cơ Minh, previously led guerrilla efforts attempting to re-enter Vietnam from Laos in the 1980s. These operations failed; Hoàng Cơ Minh was killed in 1987.

=== Non-violent struggle ===
Việt Tân embraces the non-violent struggle approach to reform. The organization believes that change has to come from within Vietnam and come from the bottom up.

The organization has outlined the following steps to democratizing Vietnam:

- Improving Social Welfare & Restoring Civil Rights
- Promoting Pluralism
- Building Collective Strength
- Expanding the Knowledge Base
- Investing in the Future Generation
- Lobbying International Support
- Strengthening the Overseas Vietnamese Community
- Building the Foundation to Reform Vietnam
- Protecting National Interests and Territorial Integrity
- Restoring Truth to Recent History

In a statement released in 2013 following the conviction of Vietnamese dissidents accused of being members of Việt Tân, the organization states that it "believes that gaining an understanding of nonviolent civil resistance, digital security and leadership skills are both empowering and the right of every free individual."

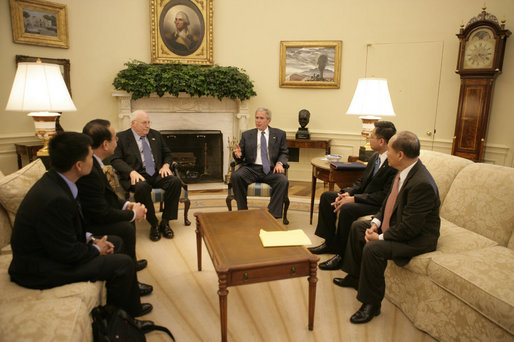
Việt Tân chairman Đỗ Hoàng Điềm (2nd from right) meets with U.S. President George Bush and Vice President Dick Cheney on May 29, 2007.

== Reception ==
=== Vietnam ===
In 2016, the Ministry of Public Security of Vietnam officially designated Việt Tân a terrorist organization. Authorities reasoned that the group had a history of supporting sabotage plots and acts of violence against the state, and that it had recruited and trained operatives to infiltrate Vietnam.

=== United States ===
The U.S. government, most notably former U.S. Ambassador Michael Michalak, has stated that there is 'no evidence' that it is a terrorist organization.

On May 29, 2007, chairman Đỗ Hoàng Điềm was invited by US president George W. Bush together with three other Vietnamese-American activists to the White House to discuss Vietnam's treatment of political dissidents. Bush later publicly criticized Vietnam's rights record during a state visit with President Nguyen Minh Triet.

=== United Nations ===
The Office of the UN High Commissioner for Human Rights has described Việt Tân as a "peaceful organization advocating for democratic reform".

=== Human Rights Watch ===
Human Rights Watch has repeatedly stated that Việt Tân "has worked for peaceful political reform, democracy, and human rights in Vietnam".

== Arrests ==
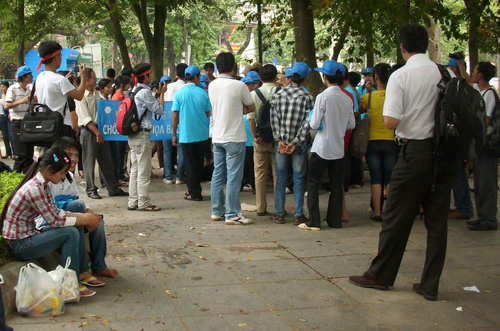
Việt Tân organizes civic action in Hanoi on October 9, 2010

=== 2007 arrests ===
On November 17, 2007, three Việt Tân members, US citizens Nguyen Quoc Quan, a mathematics researcher, and Truong Van Ba, a Hawaiian restaurant owner, and Frenchwoman Nguyen Thi Thanh Van, a contributor to Việt Tân's Radio Chan Troi Moi radio show, were arrested in Ho Chi Minh City. when 20 security officers raided the house. In addition, Thai citizen Somsak Khunmi and two Vietnamese nationals, Nguyen The Vu, a trader, and his brother Nguyen Trong Khiem were also arrested. Three days later, on November 20, 2007, Vietnamese security police arrested Nguyen Viet Trung, a Vietnamese citizen, in Phan Thiết. Born 1979, Nguyen Viet Trung is a businessman and younger brother of Nguyen The Vu.

On November 24, 2007, Vietnamese security police released university student Nguyen Trong Khiem after detaining him for a week without cause. On December 12, 2007, after weeks of protests and appeals by U.S. lawmakers and international pro-democracy movements, Vietnam released American citizen Truong Van Ba shortly after the U.S. ambassador Michael Michalak demanded to see evidence of terrorism or other charges to justify their detention. Nguyen Quoc Quan remained detained in Vietnam, with the U.S. Consulate allowed to visit him once per month. However, family visits were not allowed. His wife was granted a visa to visit him in January 2008, though the Vietnamese consulate revoked the visa one week prior her scheduled trip.

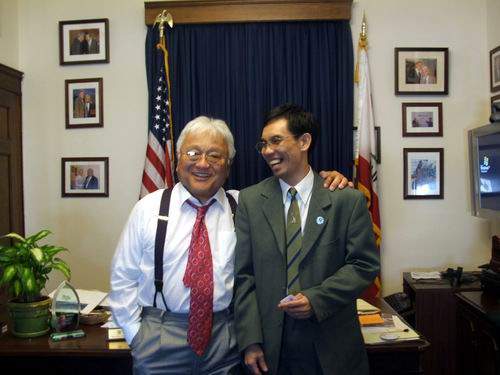
Democracy activist Nguyen Quoc Quan visits US Congressman Mike Honda in 2008, after his release from prison in Vietnam

On March 12, 2008, chairman of Việt Tân, Đỗ Hoàng Điềm, appeared before the US Senate Foreign Relations Committee's subcommittee on East Asian and Pacific Affairs along with Nguyen Quoc Quan's wife to appeal to lawmakers to confront the issue.

Nguyen Quoc Quan was sentenced to 6 months in prison, but since he had already served that time, was released on May 17, 2008, and deported back to the United States. Nguyen The Vu was released immediately, and Somsak Kunmi will serve another three months before he will be released. Other than the sentences, the presiding judge would not release any further detail of the trial.

=== 2008 arrests ===
Following the 2007 arrests, three additional Việt Tân members, Nguyen Thi Xuan Trang, a medical doctor from Switzerland, Mai Huu Bao, an electrical engineer from the United States and past Executive Board Member of the Union of Vietnamese Student Associations of Southern California as well as Nguyen Tan Anh, a manager of a health-care non-profit from Australia, attempted a visit of Nguyen Quoc Quan in Ho Chi Minh City. On April 4, 2008, the three Việt Tân members visited the Ministry of Public Security detention center in Ho Chi Minh City, but were detained by security police.

=== 2010 arrests ===
In July and August 2010, a new series of arrests by the Vietnamese government was made. The arrests included Pham Minh Hoang, a 55-year-old French-educated lecturer in applied mathematics at the Ho Chi Minh City Institute of Technology.

After the Australian consulate in Vietnam intervened in the case, Hong Vo was released from prison on October 21, 2010, and immediately expelled from the country without the possibility for her to ever return.

=== 2011 arrests ===
In May 2011, three Việt Tân members along with four other land activists were tried during a one-day, closed trial and sentenced to prison for two to seven years. During the trial, the defendants were denied access to a lawyer, and members of the US Congress, led by Representative Ed Royce, wrote a letter asking for their release.

=== 2012 arrests ===
On April 17, 2012, Nguyen Quoc Quan was arrested again at Tan Son Nhat International Airport in Ho Chi Minh City. Government officials did not confirm his arrest until five days later. He is detained on charges of terrorism and for planning to "instigate a demonstration" during the anniversary of the Fall of Saigon. He is being detained for at least four months. According to his wife, he was planning to visit his younger sister and "talk about democracy and the rule of law". Six members of the U.S. Congress signed a letter to U.S. Secretary of State Hillary Clinton and urged the State Department to call for Dr. Quan's immediate release on grounds that the Vietnamese government is "abusing its vague national security provisions as the pretext to arrest and detain individuals who peacefully advocate for religious and political freedom." Following intense US pressure, he was then deported on January 30, 2013, after spending nine months in prison.

=== 2013 convictions ===
14 activists, many associated with the Roman Catholic Redemptionist movement, arrested in 2011 after attending Việt Tân training in Thailand, were convicted of subversion after a two-day trial in Vinh, in Nghệ An Province, and sentenced in January 2013 for periods ranging from 3 to 13 years. Defendants included Dang Xuan Dieu, Dang Ngoc Minh, Ho Duc Hoa, Ho Van Oanh, Paulus Lê Sơn, Nguyen Dang Minh Man, Nguyen Dang Vinh Phuc, Nguyen Dinh Cuong, Nguyen Van Duyet, Nguyen Van Oai, Nguyen Xuan Oanh, Nong Hung Anh, Thai Van Dung, and Tran Minh Nhat.

== Campaigns ==
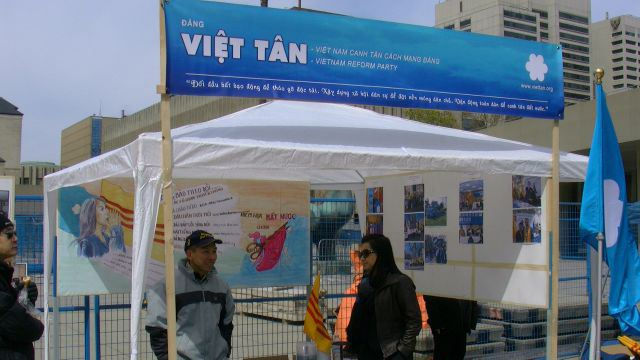
Việt Tân recruitment and infobooth centre in Canada.

=== Internet Freedom Campaign ===
In response to Vietnam's appeal to Internet companies Microsoft, Google and Yahoo to work with the Vietnamese government to restrict blogging about dissident material and hand over information that could lead to arrests, Việt Tân launched the "Internet Freedom Campaign".

In April 2012, the organization obtained a decree entitled Decree on the Management, Provision, Use of Internet Services and Information Content Online that was drafted by the Vietnamese government that would ask internet companies to censor blogs, release blogger information and possibly house data centers in Vietnam for the purpose of censorship and regulation of social media. Việt Tân published an editorial describing the draft policy and called for US companies to resist it. Reporters Without Borders later confirmed that the decree exists and that it was meant to be enacted in June 2012.

== Programs ==
=== Friends of Việt Tân ===
Việt Tân started a social networking outreach program through the Friends of Việt Tân community that allows like-minded activists to follow news and activities about Vietnam and Việt Tân and also participate in the discussion. The program was first launched as a Facebook application that allowed other users to suggest their own newsworthy articles and references to a main feed that was replicated to many other websites. The application also syndicated Radio Chân Trời Mới as a podcast, and in 2009 also introduced a vodcast.

=== Digital activism seminars ===
On November 14–15, 2009, Việt Tân organized a seminar on "Digital Activism: A Tool for Change in Vietnam" held at Georgetown University, in Washington, D.C. Incidentally, in the same week, the Vietnamese government decided to block Facebook through its internet firewall. In response, seminar attendees produced viral videos and documentation on how to circumvent Vietnam's firewall to access Facebook.

The same seminar was repeated February 27–28, 2010, at Chapman University in Orange, California, which was co-sponsored by the Asian Pacific Law Student Association and the Vietnamese American Law Student Association.

The seminar also took place at Harvard University from October 16–17, 2010.

On March 9, 2010, then-Việt Tân Spokesman Hoang Tu Duy presented on "Digital Activism in Vietnam" at the Geneva Summit for Human Rights, Tolerance and Democracy and was one of the panelist to discuss 'Next Generation: Young Rights Defenders and the Blogosphere'.

== See also ==
- 2011 crackdown on Vietnamese youth activists
- 2013 conviction of 14 Vietnamese dissidents
