= Đoàn Thanh Hà =

Vietnamese architect

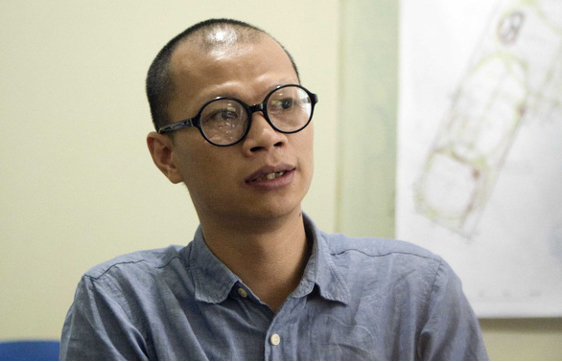
- Born: 1980 (age 45–46); Bắc Ninh, Vietnam
- Education: Hanoi Architectural University
- Occupation: Architect
- Organization(s): H&P Architects
- Awards: UIA Vassilis Sgoutas Prize
- Website: https://hpa.vn

Đoàn Thanh Hà graduated from Hanoi Architectural University (Vietnam) in 2002. He set up and has been operating H&P Architects since 2009. The studio’s works focus on poor and disadvantaged communities in Vietnam, designing structures built from natural, traditional and recycled materials. These ‘essential spaces’ are intertwined with ecological systems to form nature-like environments that can adapt to changing conditions.

He is known for the Toigetation 1&2, Cao Bang & Dien Bien; Blooming Bamboo Home, Hanoi; Floating Bamboo House 1&2, Hanoi; Be Friendly Space, Quang Ninh; BES Pavilion, Ha Tinh; S Space, Ha Nam; Ngói Space, Hanoi; AgriNesture, Quang Ninh; Brick Cave, Hanoi. His projects have received international recognition and have won numerous awards including the UIA Vassilis Sgoutas Prize 2023, Turgut Cansever International Award 2020, Barbara Cappochin Architecture Prize 2019, UIA Friendly and Inclusive Spaces Awards 2017, ARCASIA Awards for Architecture Gold Medal (2019, 2016, 2015), Architectural Review House Award 2014.

== Prize ==
Prize	Year
UIA 2030 Award	2024-2023, 2022-2021
UIA Vassilis Sgoutas Prize	2023
UIA Baku International Architecture Award	2021, 2017
National Green Architectural Awards, Vietnam	2020-2019, 2018-2017, 2014-2013
UIA Turgut Cansever International Award	2020
KOHLER Bold Design Award	2020-2019
ARCASIA Awards for Architecture	2024, 2019, 2017, 2016, 2015
UIA Barbara Cappochin International Architecture Prize	2019
Archdaily Building of the Year Award	2019
National Architectural Award, Vietnam	2019-2018, 2017-2016
Architect of the Year, Vietnam	2018
2A Continental Architectural Awards for Asia and Europe	2018
Red Dot Award	2018
International Architecture Awards	2018, 2016, 2014
Architizer A+ Awards	2018, 2017, 2016
INDE. Award, Singapore	2019, 2018
FuturArc Green Leadership Award	2018, 2016
UIA Friendly and Inclusive Spaces Awards	2017
R+D Awards	2016
AZ Awards	2015
Green Good Design Awards	2016, 2015
WAN House of the Year	2018, 2014
AR House Award	2014
