= Floriane Irangabiye =

Burundian journalist

- Born: Bunjumbura
- Citizenship: Burundi
- Occupation: Journalist

Floriane Irangabiye is a Burundian journalist who co-founded Radio Igicaniro, a Rwanda-based online outlet platforming exiles and expatriates from Burundi. In January 2023, she was convicted of "undermining the integrity" of Burundi, and was sentenced to ten years in prison after broadcasting comments critical of the Burundian government. On 14 August 2024, she was pardoned by President Évariste Ndayishimiye and on 16 August 2024 she was released from Bubanza Prison.

== Career ==
Irangabiye was born and raised in Bujumbura, Burundi, but moved to Kigali, Rwanda, in 2009. In Rwanda, Irangabiye established Radio Igicaniro, which frequently broadcast shows critical of the Burundian government, with guests including human rights activists and exiles from the country. Radio Igicaniro was created as part of Fraternité, an association of Burundians living in self-exile.

== Arrest and imprisonment ==
=== Arrest ===
While Irangabiye had lived in Rwanda since 2009, she regularly visited Burundi to see family members. During a visit in 2015, she had taken part in protests in response to the president of Burundi, Pierre Nkurunziza, announcing plans to run for a third term, which was at odds with the country's constitution.

In early August 2022, Irangabiye returned to Burundi for a month-long visit; this was her first time in the country since the Burundian unrest. Immediately prior to her visit, Radio Igicaniro had broadcast an interview between her and Burundian human rights activist Bob Rugurika. Rugurika had been living in exile after being sentenced in absentia of state security crimes in 2020 by a court in Burundi; during the interview, both he and Irangabiye made comments that were critical of the Burundian government.

On 30 August 2022, Irangabiye was intercepted by state security forces while travelling from Bujumbura to the funeral of one of her parents in Matana.

=== Detainment ===
Irangabiye was held for a week at National Defence Force headquarters in Bujumbura, without access to a lawyer. A court hearing was held on 8 September 2022. There, she was accused of attacking the integrity of Burundi. While no formal charges were made against her, Irangabiye was remanded in custody and was transferred first to Mpima Remand Prison in Bujumbura, and subsequently on 3 October 2022 to Muyinga Prison in Muyinga Province.

On 28 October 2022, Irangabiye appeared in court again, this time accused of anti-state crimes and operating without the correct journalistic accreditation.

In November 2022, it was reported that Irangabiye had been sexually assaulted by a prison guard. On 4 November, Sylvestre Nyandwi, Burundi's prosecutor general, released a statement calling the allegation "unfounded" and describing it as "an extension of Irangabiye's harmful acts towards the state of Burundi".

=== Trial and sentencing ===
Irangabiye's trial began on 16 December 2022. The prosecution's evidence included Irangabiye's regular trips from Rwanda to Burundi, as well as meetings with Burundian dissidents in Rwanda, which the prosecution cited as "evidence" of Irangabiye trying to incite young people in Burundi to overthrow the government. Photographic evidence used included photographs of Irangabiye with Paul Kagame, the president of Rwanda, and Pierre Buyoya, the former president of Burundi who had previously been given a life sentence in absentia for the assassination of his successor Melchior Ndadaye.

On 2 January 2023, Irangabiye was convicted of "undermining the integrity of the national territory" by the High Court of Mukaza. She was sentenced to ten years in prison, in addition to being fined 1,000,000 francs.

=== Appeal ===
On 23 January 2023, Irangabiye's legal team lodged an appeal with the court. A hearing was subsequently heard before the Court of Appeal of Mukaza on 30 March 2023, following which the court adjourned for 30 days. On 2 May 2023, the court upheld Irangabiye's conviction.

== International response ==
Irangabiye's arrest, trial, and conviction was widely criticised by international human rights groups, with the lack of tangible evidence against Irangabiye leading to comments that the conviction was an attempt to shut down criticism of the Burundian government.

Human Rights Watch said Irangabiye's sentencing "highlighted the Burundian authorities' manipulation of the justice system to shut down criticism". They also noted her pretrial detention without formal charges breached Burundi's Code of Criminal Procedure. In response to these comments, Nyandwi released a statement saying her detention, trial and sentencing adhered to Burundi laws and procedures, and disputed that her arrest had been politically motivated. Irangabiye's sentencing used article 611 of the Burundian criminal code, which her lawyers described as being a "vaguely worded article usually used to convict mercenaries".

Reporters Without Borders condemned the "harsh and arbitrary" sentence given to Irangabiye following a "grossly unfair" trial. It noted that the charges of Irangabiye lacking the correct press accreditation should not have applied to her, given that she broadcast from Rwanda and therefore was not regulated by Burundi's National Council of Communication.

Reports indicated that Irangabiye's health was deteriorating due to dampness and smoke at Muyinga Prison, which worsened her asthma. Following appeals by international human rights groups like Amnesty International, she was moved to Bubanza Prison in October 2023.

== Release ==
On 14 August 2024, Floriane Irangabiye was pardoned by President Évariste Ndayishimiye. On 16 August 2024, after eighteen months in prison, she was released from Bubanza Prison.

== See also ==
- Sandra Muhoza: Burundian journalist charged in 2024 with similar offences
