= Đặng Đăng Phước =

Vietnamese human rights activist and music teacher

Đặng Đăng Phước (born 20 August 1963) is a Vietnamese human rights activist and music teacher. He became known for his online activism against corruption and for the protection of civil and political rights.

Phước served in the People's Army of Vietnam and was stationed in Laos for four years. After leaving the army, he became a music teacher at the Đắk Lắk College of Pedagogy. He lived in Buôn Ma Thuột, Đắk Lắk province with his wife, Lê Thị Hà, and has two sons.

In addition to his two Facebook pages, Phước also had a blog, Musical Library, which had 3.5 million views on its articles, which included his thoughts on music, education and politics.

Phước became an activist for the poor, as well as land rights activists and the Montagnard ethnic groups. He also campaigned against government corruption and advocated for freedom of speech, expression, association, assembly, and religion. He opposed the 2018 cybersecurity law and signed several pro-democracy petitions, including Petition 72 in January 2013, which called for constitutional changes to permit multiparty elections. He also signed the Declaration of Free Citizens in February 2013, which sought to abolish article 4 of the Vietnamese constitution, which gave the Communist Party a monopoly on power.

In May 2016, he signed a declaration against Formosa, a Taiwanese steel company that dumped toxic waste, causing marine pollution along Vietnam's central coast. In June 2022, he voiced concerns about "reckless" titanium mining in Thừa Thiên Huế province. He spoke out vocally for imprisoned activists including Nguyễn Lân Thắng and Phạm Chí Dũng.

Phước also performed songs by activists, including "Vietnam Path" and "A Big Circus Troupe in a Small Homeland".

On 8 September 2022, Phước wrote a Facebook post in support of Bui Tuan Lam, who had been arrested the day before by provincial police in Da Nang. Two hours later, police in Đắk Lắk arrested Phước and charged him with conducting propaganda against the state, against article 117 of the penal code. Following his arrest, his wife Hàwas interrogated on at least two occasions about posts he had made on Facebook. The state-owned Daklak newspaper reported that Phước had shared over 200 articles online attacking the government.

Phước was sentenced to eight years imprisonment for criticising the Vietnamese government and "conducting anti-state propaganda" on 6 June 2023, alongside four years of probation following his release. Phước disputed the verdict and proclaimed his innocence. He is serving his sentence at Xuan Phước Prison in Phu Yen province.

Phước appealed his sentence. On 26 September 2023, the sentence was upheld by the High People's Court in Đắk Lắk, in an appeal that lasted two hours.

In December 2023, Phước's wife Hà reported that local police had installed cameras pointing towards her home. In May 2024, she reported that Phước had been put into solitary confinement for violating unspecified regulations between 10 and 20 May, and that his visitation had been reduced from monthly to every two months until "his attitude improves".

Human Rights Watch called for the charges against Phước to be dropped and for him to be immediately released, accusing Vietnamese authorities of using repressive laws to silence people calling for reform. Radio Free Asia noted that Phước was the 11th activist convicted in Vietnam in 2023.
