= Nguyễn Lân Thắng =

Vietnamese blogger

Nguyễn Lân Thắng (born 18 December 1975) is a Vietnamese blogger and human rights activist. He rose to prominence for his documentation of protests and human rights abuses by authorities in Vietnam.

== Personal life ==
Thắng was born into an academic family in Hanoi; his parents were both lecturers, with his father employed as a professor of electrical systems at Hanoi University of Science and Technology. Thắng's grandfather, Nguyễn Lân, was named People's Teacher of Vietnam after publishing a popular Vietnamese dictionary. Thắng graduated from Hanoi Architectural University in Hanoi with a degree in engineering. Until his imprisonment, Thắng lived in Đống Đa, Hanoi with his wife Lê Bích Vượng and their children, Đậu and Đỗ.

== Activism ==
Thắng first became politically active in the early 2000s as a member of the anti-China movement. He was a co-founder of No-U FC, a football club consisting of players who were openly critical of China's territorial claims of maritime areas claimed by Vietnam in the South China Sea. Through No-U, Thắng also provided humanitarian assistance to people experiencing poverty in rural areas of Vietnam, and especially those impacted by natural disasters in the Central Highlands.

Thắng took part in anti-China protests in Hanoi and Ho Chi Minh City, which were violently suppressed by Vietnamese authorities. As a result of this, Thắng's activism expanded to criticisms of the government, including becoming a proponent of land rights and protesting against forced land confiscations by local government officials. He also defended human rights and particularly the freedom of religion. Thắng often travelled to land confiscations, recording and publishing the authorities' excessive use of force and posting clips online. Thắng also vocally supported dissidents including Trần Đức Thạch, Phạm Đoan Trang and Cấn Thị Thêu.

Between 2013 and 2022, Thắng was a blogger and commentator for Radio Free Asia's Vietnamese language service, where he regularly posted articles on social and political issues in Vietnam, as well as calls for peaceful activism. Thắng also posted regularly on Facebook under the pseudonym Ông Ké, including satirical posts about Hồ Chí Minh and senior officials of the Communist Party of Vietnam; he frequently accused them of making policies that benefitted politicians and the ruling elite, as opposed to the population at large.

On 18 July 2013, Thắng was among a group of bloggers who established the Vietnam Bloggers Network (Vietnamese: Mạng lưới blogger Việt Nam), which called on the government to repeal article 258 of the penal code, which had been used to arrest and charge a number of human rights activists who wrote blogs. Thắng and other members of the group presented their case to international organisations, including the Office of the United Nations High Commissioner for Human Rights, and Human Rights Watch. Upon his return to Vietnam on 30 October 2013, Thắng was temporarily detained by the police, before being released without charge the next day. In April 2024, Thắng had been prevented from travelling to the United States from Noi Bai International Airport in Hanoi.

== Arrest and trial ==
On 5 July 2022, Thắng was arrested by the Investigative Bureau of Hanoi Police, and charged with "making, storing, distributing or propagandising information, materials [and] documents to oppose the state of the Socialist Republic of Vietnam", in breach of article 117 (1) of the penal code. Thắng was remanded in custody, and was not shown the indictment against him until 30 March 2023; he also was unable to see his family between his arrest and the start of his trial in April.

Thắng's trial took place on 12 April 2023 at the People's Court of Hanoi. His lawyer argued that the only evidence cited against Thắng was an interview he gave with the BBC's Vietnamese service, in which he had commented that many believed the revolutionary Võ Thị Sáu may have experienced mental health difficulties. They also argued that Thắng had not criticised the government specifically, but rather corruption in the country more generally. The prosecution claimed that books by the imprisoned dissident Phạm Đoan Trang had been found in his possession.

Thắng's trial lasted only a few hours, and concluded with him being given a six-year custodial sentenced, to be followed by two years of probation. Thắng's sentence is being carried out at prison no. 5 in Thanh Hóa province. Thắng indicated that he would not appeal his sentence, citing the pressure it would place his family under, and also raising concerns it could inadvertently lead to his sentence being extended.

== Response ==
During Thắng's detention, his cousin Nguyễn Lân Hieu, a member of the National Assembly, posted a photo on social media of his family, including Thắng, in what was seen by some as an implicit sign of support for him. Thắng's parents wrote a letter to the court, stating that "speaking up for disadvantaged people" was not a "crime against the government".

The US State Department released a statement criticising Thắng's sentence, calling on the Vietnamese government to release Thắng and drop the charges against him. A group of international human rights organisations called on the President of Vietnam, Võ Văn Thưởng, to ensure that Thắng had a fair trial by allowing the press and the public to attend it. The Committee to Protect Journalists called Thắng's sentence an "insult" and called for it to be reversed "immediately". Front Line Defenders described the sentence as a "clear judicial error" and stated it needed to be squashed.

Radio Free Asia, where Thắng acted as a contributor, described Thắng's sentence as a "miscarriage of justice", and noted that he was one of four of their contributors currently serving custodial prison sentences in Vietnam.

In December 2023, Thắng's wife Vượng stated that he was being psychologically abused in prison, including being kept in cells with prisoners with mental health difficulties who "swear, scold [and] insult" him, impacting negatively on his mental health. Human Rights Watch accused Vietnamese authorities of using "so-called trustee prisoners" to "terrorise" Thắng and other political prisoners, in order to be able to claim having no direct role in any abuse experienced by dissidents, calling his ongoing detention "completely outrageous and unacceptable".
