= Trịnh Xuân Thanh =

Vietnamese politician and businessman

- Born: 13 February 1966 (age 60); Hanoi, North Vietnam
- Education: Hanoi Architectural University
- Occupations: Politician, businessman
- Political party: Communist Party of Vietnam (until 2016)

Trịnh Xuân Thanh (born 13 February 1966) is a Vietnamese former politician and businessman. He is the former head of the state-owned Petrovietnam Construction Joint Stock Corporation (a subsidiary of Petrovietnam), and the former Deputy-Chairman of the Provincial People's Committee of Hậu Giang province. In 2016, he was accused of causing massive losses at the state-owned company and fled the country. While in Berlin, as an asylum-seeker, he was allegedly kidnapped by Vietnamese secret service agents and repatriated back to Vietnam on 23 July 2017. This led to a diplomatic scandal in which Germany expelled a Vietnamese diplomat.

He later announced on Vietnamese television that he had decided to turn himself in to the authorities. However, there have been suggestions that his statement was possibly made under duress. On 22 January 2018, he was sentenced to life imprisonment.

== Early life ==
Trịnh Xuân Thanh was born 13 February 1966 in Hanoi, North Vietnam. He graduated from Hanoi Architectural University in 1990.

== Career ==
Trịnh Xuân Thanh is a former member of the Communist Party of Vietnam.

Thanh began his career in Germany from 1990 to 1995. He later worked for the state-owned company in Vietnam. In 2007, he joined Petrovietnam Construction Joint Stock Corporation (PVC). He served as its Chairman from 2009 to 2013. He was subsequently accused of causing $150m in losses at PVC.

Thanh worked for the Ministry of Industry and Trade in Da Nang in 2013. He later served as the Deputy-Chairman of the Hậu Giang Provincial People's Committee.

=== Kidnapping in Germany, July 2017 ===
On July 23, 2017, TC2 allegedly kidnapped Trịnh Xuân Thanh in Berlin. He and his companion, who is a woman, were kidnapped in the Tiergarten area. A car with Czech license plates was involved in the incident. Witnesses reported that they only realized it was a kidnapping when they heard his companion screaming.

From Germany, Trinh Xuan Thanh was transferred to Prague and from Prague to Bratislava. In his memoires, Slovak ex-president Andrej Kiska mentions that few days after the kidnapping incident, one of Kiska's bodyguards told him that a Vietnamese citizen had been kidnapped from Slovakia and that then Interior Minister Robert Kaliňák was behind it, who was later arrested by a Slovak government agency of "tax secrecy". In 2019, Slovakian police critic Ivan Matušík found an invoice for 17,000 euros from the Slovak Ministry of Interior to the Vietnamese Ministry of Interior for flight costs to Moscow dated July 26, 2017.

The New York Times reported that Mr. Thanh’s lawyer, Victor Pfaff, told Reuters that he was abducted on July 23 outside a Sheraton Hotel in the Tiergarten district of Berlin and driven away in a car with Czech plates. Mr. Pfaff said that Mr. Thanh arrived in Germany in August 2016, after a four-day journey through Laos, Thailand and Turkey, and that his wife and two children were in Berlin while another son stayed in Vietnam.

=== Imprisonment, 2017 to date ===
Trịnh Xuân Thanh was then forcibly taken to Vietnam and has been in state custody there. On 3 August 2017, Thanh appeared on Vietnamese television and said he had returned to Vietnam voluntarily; however, his asylum lawyer suggested he may have said this under duress. Vietnam's Foreign Ministry in a press conference expressed regret over a statement from Germany accusing Vietnam of kidnapping him.

Trịnh Xuân Thanh was sentenced in Hanoi on 22 January 2018 to life imprisonment for embezzlement and economic mismanagement.

== Reaction of German officials ==
On 2 August, the German foreign ministry confirmed the kidnapping, blaming the Vietnamese intelligence service and the Vietnamese Embassy in Germany, for what it called "an unprecedented and glaring breach of German and international law". In response, they ordered a Vietnamese intelligence officer from the Vietnamese embassy in Berlin to leave Germany within 48 hours and demanded that Thanh be allowed to return immediately to allow the Vietnamese authorities to apply for his extradition and to allow his application for asylum to be examined. Germany also said it was considering other measures against Vietnam.

On 4 August, Foreign Minister Sigmar Gabriel said and repeated in an interview with Bärbel Krauss, "I want to say this quite clearly: under no circumstances will we tolerate this kind of thing. Nor will we let it go....But we reserve the right to take further measures if necessary...But obviously we cannot simply go back to business as usual, as if nothing had happened." On August 10, 2017, the Federal Prosecutor at the Federal Court of Justice took over the investigation from the Berlin Public Prosecutor's Office.

In July 2018, one of the persons involved in kidnapping was sentenced by the Kammergericht Berlin to three years and ten months in prison for intelligence agent activity in conjunction with aiding and abetting deprivation of liberty. This verdict was confirmed by the Federal Court of Justice in August 2019.

The German newspaper TAZ gave further details: Thanh had previously sought political asylum at the beginning of 1990s but had returned voluntarily to Vietnam in 1995, and, despite the fact that there was an international arrest warrant for him issued in September 2016 by the Ministry of Public Security of Vietnam, he was not pursued because the claim "violating Vietnamese law" was not considered concrete enough.
