= Futurock =

Radio station in Argentina

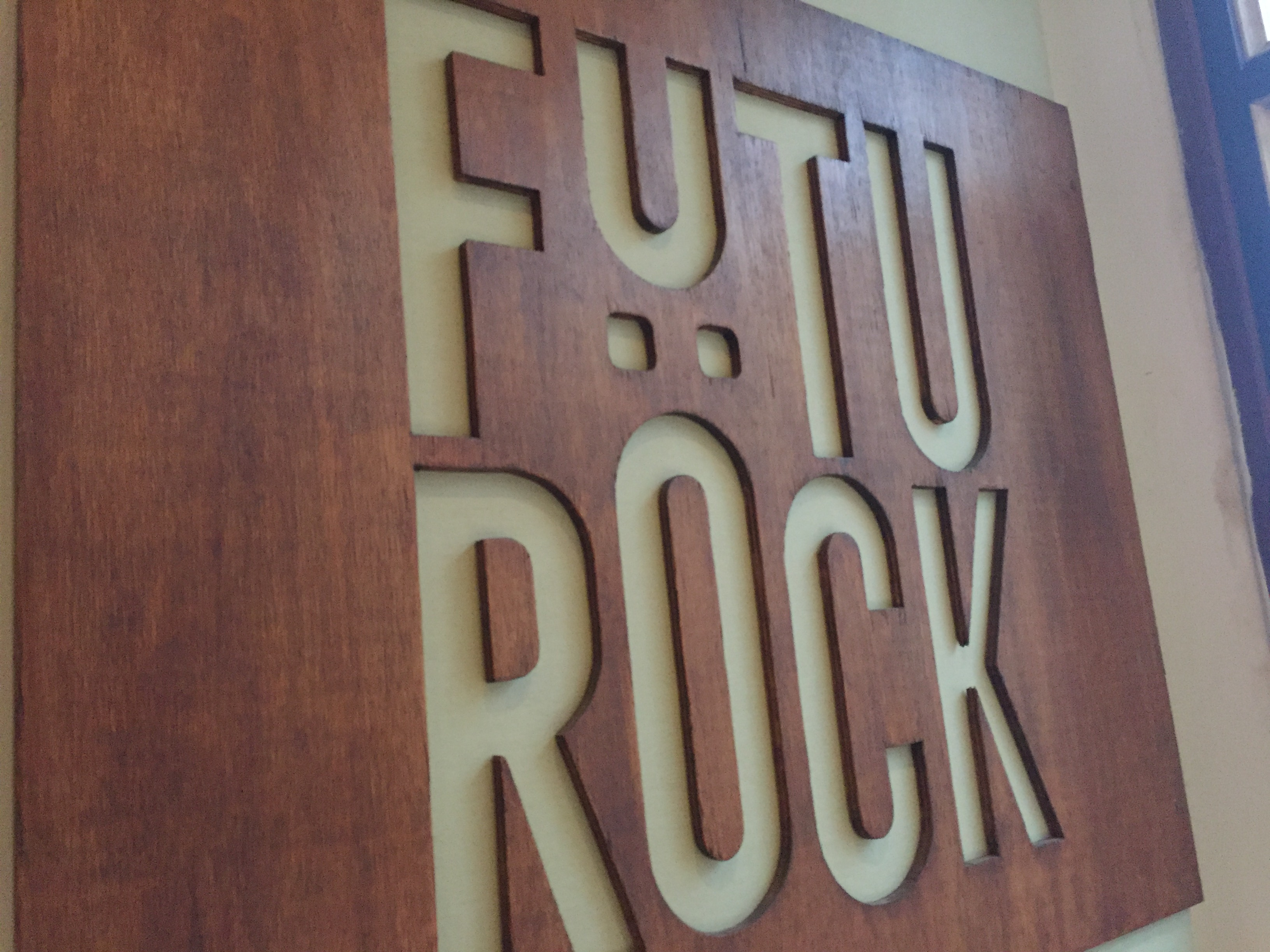
- Argentina

Programming
- Format: News/music radio

History
- First air date: 4 July 2016

Links
- Website: Futurock.fm

Futurock (stylized as Futuröck) is an independent radio station based in Almagro, Buenos Aires. Founded in 2016 by Argentine journalist Julia Mengolini, Futurock was one of the first listener-supported online radio stations in Argentina.
