= No-U FC =

No-U Football Club is an association football club based in Hanoi, Vietnam.

== History ==
No-U FC was founded in protest against the Chinese government after tensions escalated between the Vietnamese government and the Chinese government about the South China Sea. Among its founders were Nguyễn Chí Tuyến and Nguyễn Lân Thắng.
