= Reporters Without Borders =

International organisation for freedom of the press

- Reporters Sans Frontières
- Logo since 2020
- Formation: 1985; 41 years ago
- Founder: Robert Ménard, Rémy Loury, Jacques Molénat and Émilien Jubineau
- Type: Nonprofit organisation, non-governmental organisation with consultative status at the United Nations
- Headquarters: Paris, France
- Director General: Thibaut Bruttin (since November 2024)
- Key people: Thibaut Bruttin, Secretary General; Pierre Haski, President RSF France; Mickael Rediske, President RSF Germany; Christian Mihr, CEO RSF Germany; Rubina Möhring, President RSF Austria; Alfonso Armada (writer), President RSF Spain; Gérard Tschopp, President RSF Switzerland; Erik Halkjær, President, RSF Sweden; Jarmo Mäkelä, President, RSF Finland
- Budget: €6 million (RSF France)
- Staff: Approximately 100
- Website: rsf.org/en

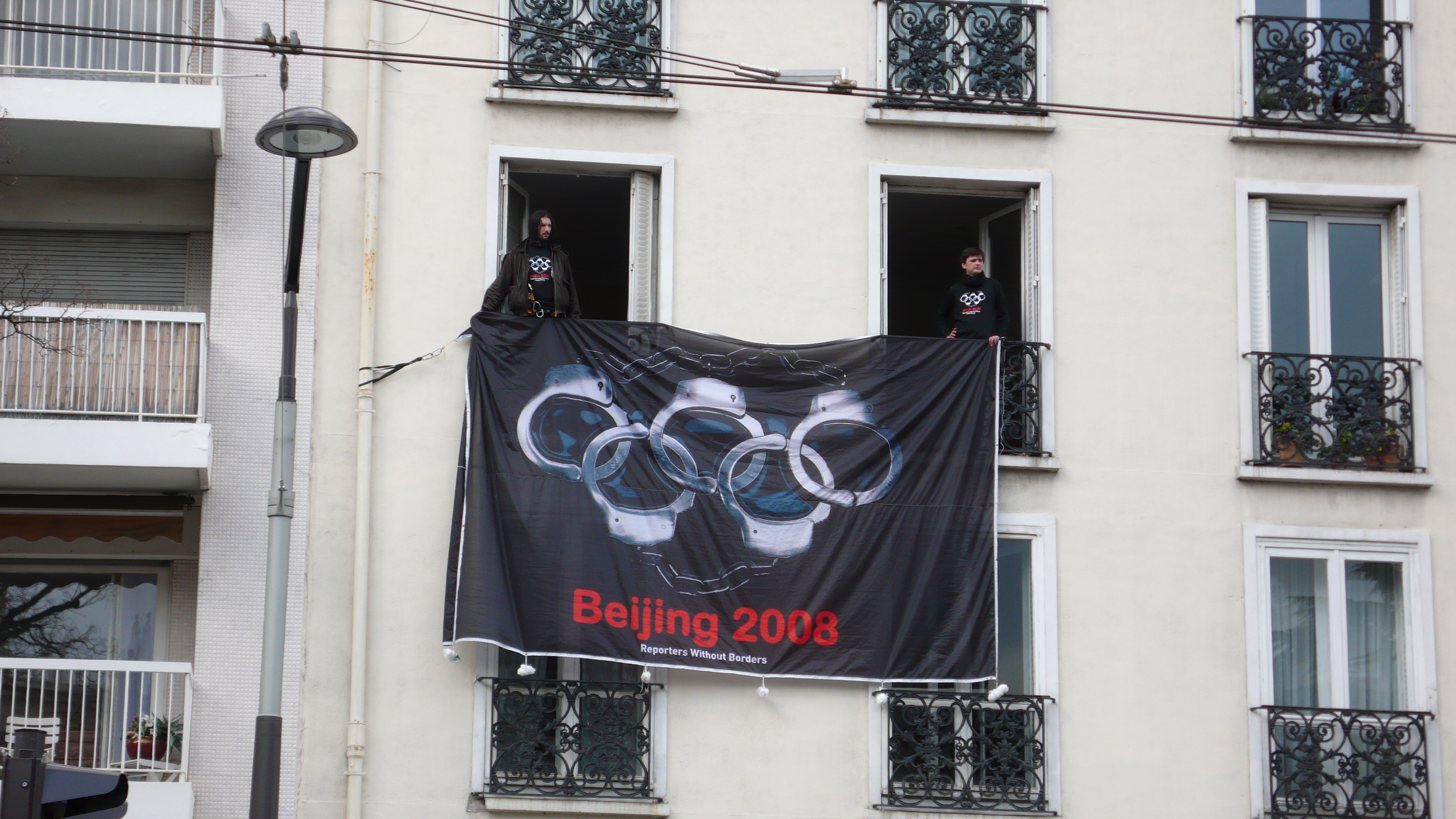
Protest action in Paris, April 2008, displaying a 'Reporters Without Borders (RSF)' flag depicting the Olympic rings in the form of handcuffs or padlocks, along with the legend 'Beijing 2008'

Reporters Without Borders (French: Reporters sans frontières; RSF) is an international non-profit and non-governmental organization headquartered in Paris, which focuses on safeguarding the right to freedom of information. It describes its advocacy as founded on the belief that everyone requires access to the news and information, in line with Article 19 of the Universal Declaration of Human Rights that recognises the right to receive and share information regardless of frontiers, along with other international rights charters. RSF has consultative status at the United Nations, UNESCO, the Council of Europe, and the International Organisation of the Francophonie.

RSF works on the ground in defence of individual journalists at risk and at the highest levels of government and international forums to defend the right to freedom of expression and information. It provides daily briefings and press releases on threats to media freedom in French, English, Spanish, Portuguese, Arabic, Persian and Chinese and publishes an annual press freedom round up, the World Press Freedom Index, that measures the state of media freedom in 180 countries. The organisation provides assistance to journalists at risk and training in digital and physical security, as well as campaigning to raise public awareness of abuse against journalists and to secure their safety and liberty. RSF lobbies governments and international bodies to adopt standards and legislation in support of media freedom and takes legal action in defence of journalists under threat. In addition, RSF keeps a yearly count of journalists killed on the job.

== Organization ==
Logo before 2020

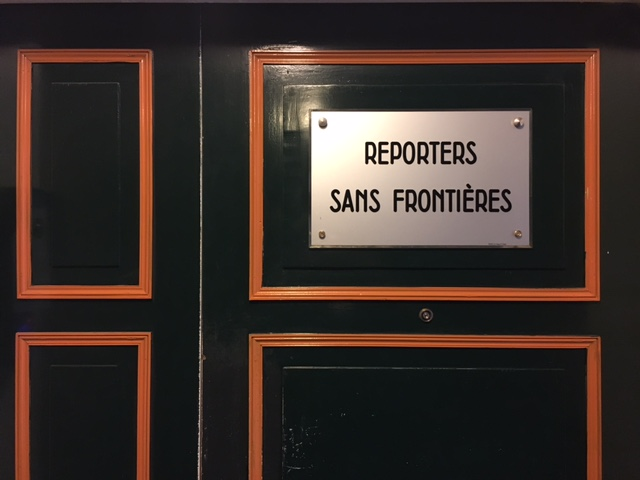
Head office in Paris

RSF was founded in Montpellier, France, in 1985 by Robert Ménard, Rémy Loury, Jacques Molénat and Émilien Jubineau. It was registered as a non-profit organisation in 1995. Ménard was RSF's first secretary general, succeeded by Jean-François Julliard. Christophe Deloire was appointed secretary-general in 2012, and remained so until his death in June 2024. Thibaut Bruttin is the current secretary-general, appointed in November 2024.

RSF's head office is based in Paris. As of 2018, it has 13 regional and national offices, including Brussels, London, Washington, Berlin, Rio de Janeiro, Taipei and Dakar, and a network of 146 correspondents with 57 salaried staff in Paris and internationally. As of 2016, a board of governors, elected from RSF's members, approves the organisation's policies, while an International Council has oversight of its activities and approves the budget.

In August 2025, the Office of the Prosecutor General of the Russian Federation declared RSF an "undesirable organization" in Russia, effectively banning operations within the country.

== Initiatives ==
2026 World Press Freedom Index Good Satisfactory Problematic Difficult Very serious Not classified

=== Journalism Trust Initiative ===
The Journalism Trust Initiative (JTI) seeks to assure readers that participating outlets are credible. RSF launched the JTI in 2018 with its partners: the European Broadcasting Union (EBU), Agence France-Presse (AFP), and the Global Editors Network (GEN). The indicators focus on transparency, good governance, and accountability. Like The Trust Project, the JTI focuses only on the process of how journalism is created rather than evaluating an outlet's content. The JTI had more detailed criteria and a longer process designed to align with regulatory statutes in Europe. JTI standards have been used to inform standards for policies in Canada and the European Union. As of November 2025, 2,000 media organizations worldwide have registered with JTI including the Associated Press and BBC World News.

A 2023 analysis by the Center for International Media Assistance concluded that initiatives like JTI could significantly encourage more accurate news reporting. However, the study noted that evaluating the success of these relatively new programs remains difficult. This challenge arises because it is hard to measure how platform algorithms incorporate or ignore these reliability signals.

=== Actions ===
RSF's defence of journalistic freedom includes international missions, the publication of country reports, training of journalists and public protests.

RSF has published the Munich Charter, an authoritative document which clarifies the "Rights and Obligations" of Journalists. The Charter was initially developed by the German Journalist Association and first published in Munich 1971, and is accepted as authoritative within the profession. It was later adopted by most journalists' unions in Europe.

In 2017, RSF turned off the Eiffel Tower lights in tribute to murdered Saudi journalist Jamal Khashoggi.

In July 2018, RSF sent a mission to Saudi Arabia to call for the release of 30 journalists. The organisation publishes a gallery of Predators of Press Freedom, highlighting the most egregious international violators of press freedom. It also has maintained an online Press Freedom Barometer, monitoring the number of journalists, media workers and citizen journalists killed or imprisoned. Its programme Operation Collateral Freedom, launched in 2014, provides alternative access to censored websites by creating mirror sites: 22 sites have been unblocked in 12 countries, including Iran, China, Saudi Arabia and Vietnam. RSF offers grants to journalists at risk and supports media workers in need of refuge and protection.

To mark World Day Against Cyber Censorship on 12 March 2020, Reporters Without Borders (RSF) unveiled a list of 20 Digital Predators of Press Freedom and announced that it is unblocking access to a total 21 websites in the sixth year of its Operation Collateral Freedom.

On 21 April 2020, the RSF based in Paris said that the pandemic had amplified and highlighted many crises and over shadowed freedom of the press. The high representative of the EU, Josep Borrell, stated that the pandemic should not be used to justify the limitation of democratic and civil freedoms and that the rule of law and international commitments should be respected. He said freedom of speech and access to information should not be limited and that measures taken against the pandemic should not be used to restrict human rights advocates, reporters, media staff and institutions of civil societies.

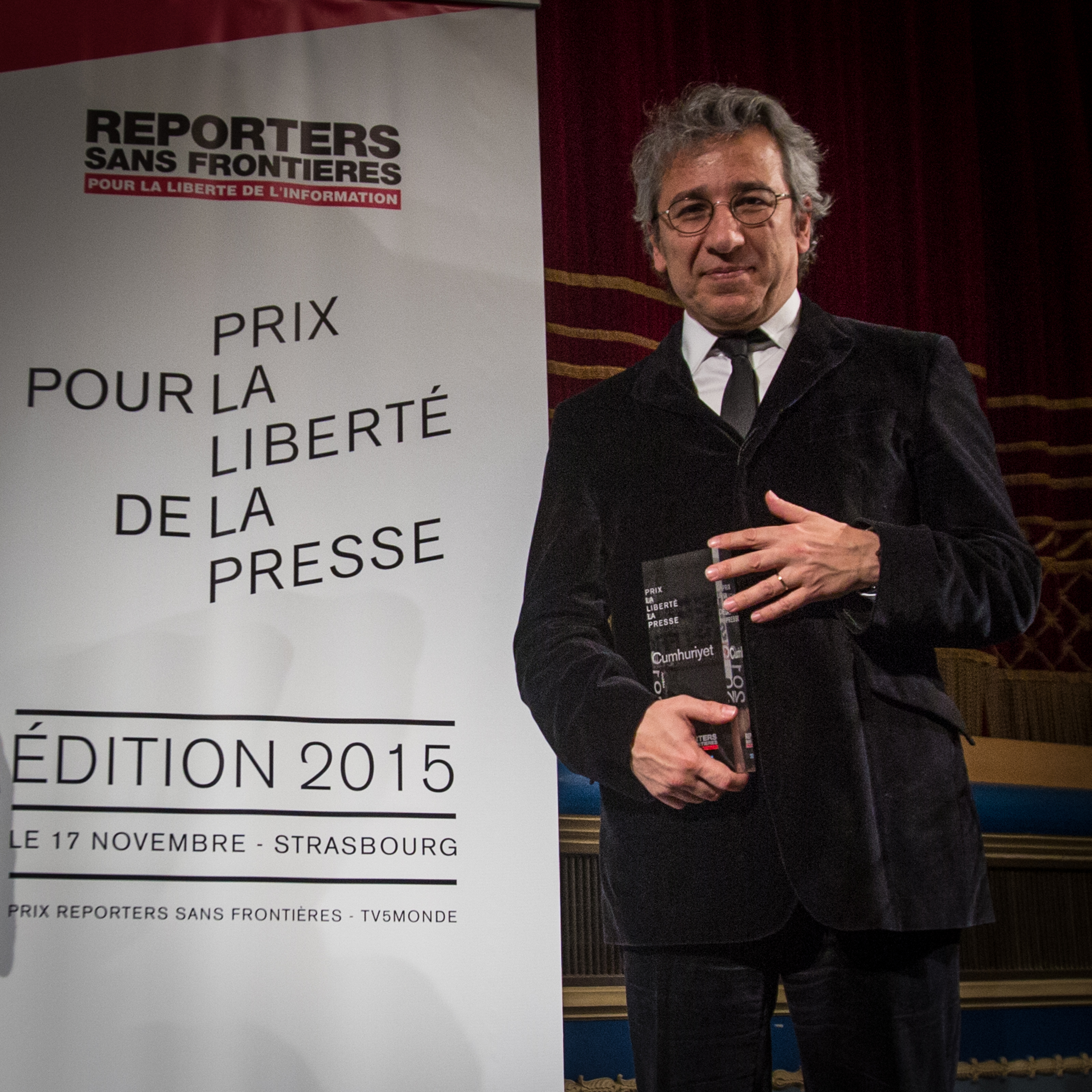
Cumhuriyet's former editor-in-chief Can Dündar receiving the 2015 RSF Prize. Shortly thereafter, he was arrested.

On 22 December 2023, RSF filed a complaint with the International Criminal Court over the killing of seven Palestinian journalists, including Samer Abu Daqqa.

In March 2025, the release of four journalists were named by RWB as one of that year's priority campaign. They were Frenchie Mae Cumpio of the Philippines, Sandra Muhoza of Burundi, Sevinj Vagifgizi of Azerbaijan and Phạm Đoan Trang of Vietnam.

In 2025, RSF reported that 67 journalists were killed, 503 were imprisoned, 135 were missing, and 20 were held hostage, calling it a "deadly year" for journalists as a result of "hate and impunity."

=== Prizes ===
==== Press Freedom Prize ====
RSF's annual Press Freedom Prize, created in 1992, honours courageous and independent journalists who have faced threats or imprisonment for their work and who have challenged the abuse of power. TV5Monde and Le Monde have previously been partners in the prize.

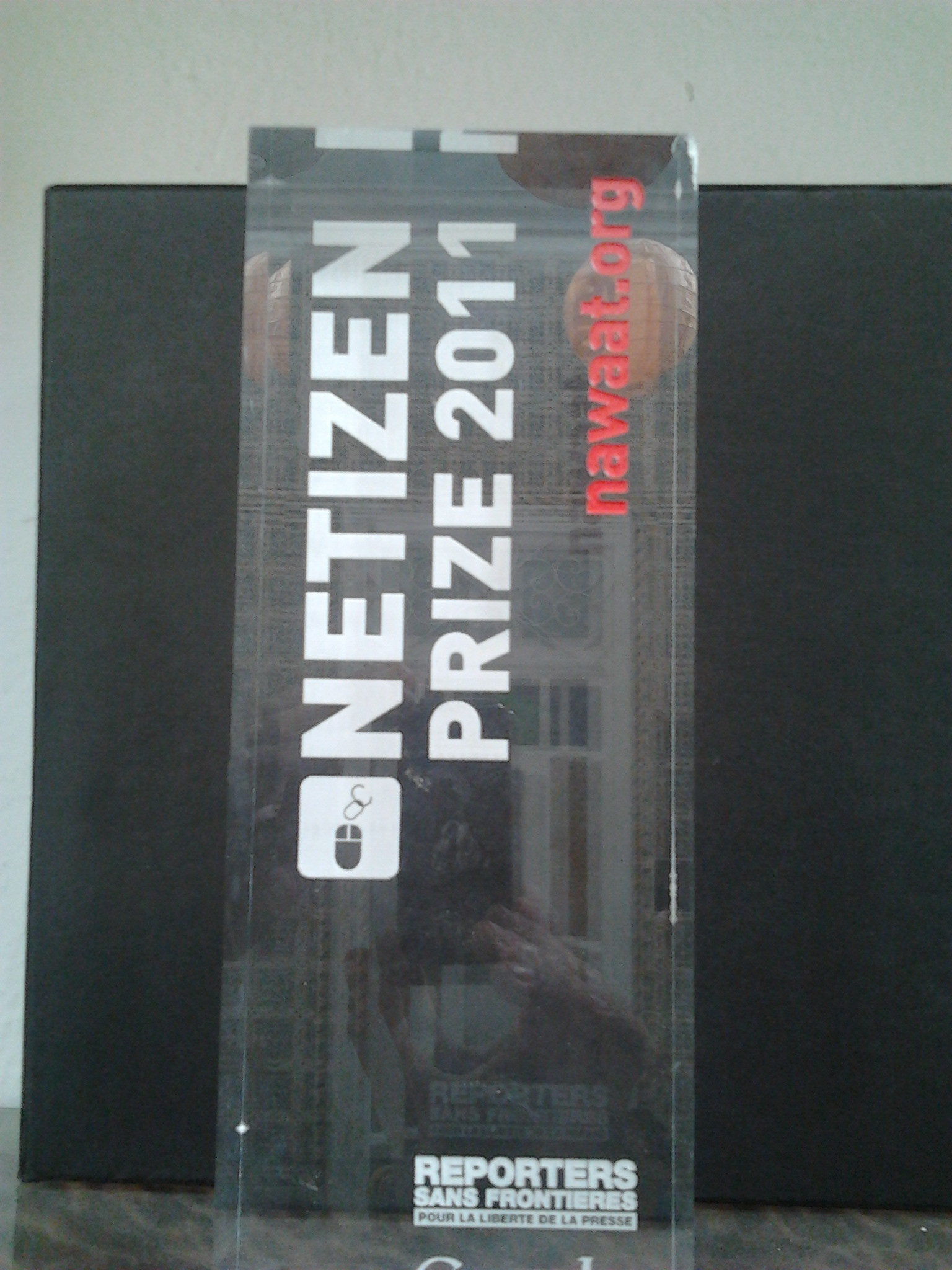
RWB 2011 Netizen Prize

In 2018, RSF launched new categories for the Press Freedom Prize: Courage, independence, and impact.

In 2023, RSF introduced the photojournalism prize called Lucas Dolega-SAIF Photo Prize, a tribute to Lucas Dolega, a young photographer killed in 2011, and supported from the outset by the Society of Authors of Visual Arts and Still Images (SAIF).

In 2024, RSF introduced the Mohamed Maïga Prize for African Investigative Journalism, which honours the memory of the Malian investigative journalist and his fight to uphold social justice in Africa through his writing.

Winners:

- 1992 Zlatko Dizdarević, Bosnia-Herzegovina
- 1993 Wang Juntao, China
- 1994 André Sibomana, Rwanda
- 1995 Christina Anyanwu, Nigeria
- 1996 Isik Yurtçu, Turkey
- 1997 Raúl Rivero, Cuba
- 1998 Nizar Nayyouf, Syria
- 1999 San San Nweh, Burma
- 2000 Carmen Gurruchaga, Spain
- 2001 Reza Alijani, Iran
- 2002 Grigory Pasko, Russia
- 2003 Ali Lmrabet, Morocco; The Daily News, Zimbabwe; Michèle Montas, Haiti
- 2004 Hafnaoui Ghoul, Algeria; Zeta, Mexico; Liu Xiaobo, China
- 2005 Zhao Yan, China; Tolo TV, Afghanistan; National Union of Somali Journalists, Somalia; Massoud Hamid, Syria
- 2006 Win Tin, Burma; Novaya Gazeta, Russia; Guillermo Fariñas Hernández, Cuba
- 2007 Seyoum Tsehaye, Eritrea; Democratic Voice of Burma, Burma; Kareem Amer, Egypt; Hu Jia, Zeng Jinyan, China
- 2008 Ricardo Gonzales Alfonso, Cuba; Radio Free NK, North Korea; Zarganar and Nay Phone Latt, Burma
- 2009 Amira Hass, Israel; Dosh, Chechnya
- 2010 Abdolreza Tajik, Iran; Radio Shabelle, Somalia
- 2011 Ali Ferzat, Syria; Weekly Eleven News, Burma
- 2012 Mazen Darwish, Syria; 8Sobh, Afghanistan
- 2013 Muhammad Bekjanov, Uzbekistan; Uthayan, Sri Lanka
- 2014 Sanjuana Martínez, Mexico; FrontPage Africa, Liberia; Raif Badawi, Saudi Arabia
- 2015 Zeina Erhaim, Syria; Zone9, Ethiopia; Cumhuriyet, Turkey
- 2016 Hadi Abdullah, Syria; 64Tianwang, China; Lu Yuyu and Li Tingyu, China
- 2017 Tomasz Piątek, Poland; Medyascope, Turkey; Soheil Arabi, Iran
- 2018 Swati Chaturvedi, India; Matthew Caruana Galizia, Malta; Inday Espina-Varona; Philippines; Carole Cadwalladr, United Kingdom
- 2019 Eman al Nafjan, Saudi Arabia; Pham Doan Trang, Vietnam; Caroline Muscat, Malta
- 2020 Lina Attalah, Egypt; Elena Milashina, Belarus; Jimmy Lai, Hong Kong
- 2021 Zhang Zhan, China; Pegasus Project of the network Forbidden Stories, France; Majdoleen Hassona, Palestine
- 2022 Narges Mohammadi for Courage, Iran; Mstyslav Chernov and Yevhen Maloletka for Impact, Ukraine; and Omar Radi for Independence, Morocco
- 2023 Juan Pablo Barrientos for Impact, Colombia; Mohamed Ibrahim Radwan (also known as Mohamed Oxygen) for Courage, Egypt; José Rubén Zamora for Independence, Guatemala; Karine Pierre for Photography, France
- 2024 Natalya Gumenyuk (Ukraine) for Impact Prize; Waël al-Dahdouh (Palestine) for Courage Prize; Ravish Kumar (India) for Independence Prize, Gaël Turine (Belgium) for Photo Prize; Mariam Ouédraogo (Burkina Faso) for the Mohamed Maïga Prize for African Investigative Journalism
- 2025 - Sevinj Vagifgizi (Azerbaijan) for the Courage Prize; Bisan Owda (Palestine) for the Impact Prize; Shin Daewe (Myanmar) for the Independence Prize; Atiana Serge Oulon (Burkina Faso) for the Mohamed Maïga Prize for African Investigative Journalism; Robin Tutenges (France) for the Lucas Dolega–SAIF Photo Award
- 2026 - Myanmar photojournalist Sai Zaw Thaike (Courage Prize); Mozambican journalist Carlitos Cadangue (Impact Prize); Argentine journalist Julia Mengolini (Independence Prize); Guinean journalist Habib Marouane Camara (Mohamed Maïga Prize for African Investigative Journalism); and Palestinian photojournalist Abdul Hakim Abu Riash (Lucas Dolega–SAIF Photo Prize)

Netizen Prize

RSF's Netizen Prize was introduced in 2010, in partnership with Google, recognising individuals, including bloggers and cyber-dissidents, who have advanced freedom of information online through investigative reporting or other initiatives.

==== Press freedom predator list ====
RSF has also listed the world's worst press freedom 'predators' in 2001, 2009-11, 2013, 2016, and 2021.

== Publications ==
In addition to its country, regional and thematic reports, RSF publishes a photography book 100 Photos for Press Freedom as a tool for advocacy and a fundraiser. The organization says it raised nearly a quarter of its funds in 2018 from book sales.

=== Annual reports ===
RSF issues a report annually. RSF said that 110 journalists were killed in the course of their work in 2015. In 2016, RSF stated that, there were 348 imprisoned journalists and 52 hostages. Nearly two-thirds of imprisoned journalists were in Turkey, China, Syria, Egypt and Iran. RSF's 2018 report stated that over 80 journalists were killed, 348 were currently imprisoned, and another 60 were being held hostage.

== Recognitions ==
RSF has received multiple international awards honouring its achievements:

- 1992: received the "Lorenzo Natali Prize" from the European Commission for defending human rights and democracy.
- 1997: received the "Journalism and Democracy Prize" from the Parliament Assembly of the Organization for Security and Co-operation in Europe (OSCE).
- 1999: received the prize "Archivio Disarmo - Golden Doves for Peace" from IRIAD.
- 2005: shared the European Parliament's Sakharov Prize for "Freedom of Thought" with Nigerian human rights lawyer Hauwa Ibrahim and Cuba's Ladies in White movement.
- 2006: received the "Asia Democracy and Human Rights Award" from Taiwan Foundation for Democracy.
- 2007: received the "Dawit Isaak Prize" from the Swedish Publicists' Association.
- 2008: received the "Kahlil Gibran Award for Institutional Excellence" from the Arab American Institute Foundation.
- 2009: received the "Charlemagne medal" for European Media.
- 2012: received the "Club Internacional de Prensa" Award, in Madrid.
- 2013: received the "Freedom of Speech Award" from the International Association of Press Clubs, in Warsaw.
- 2019: Dan David Prize, Defending Democracy, jointly with Michael Ignatieff.
- 2024: Foundation Day Honorary Award, Hasselt University (Belgium)

== See also ==
- Avocats Sans Frontières
- Committee to Protect Journalists
- Electronic Frontier Foundation
- Freedom of speech
- Freedom of the Press Foundation
- Internet censorship
- Political repression of cyber-dissidents
- Safety of journalists
- Superprovisional measure
