= Sandra Muhoza =

Burundian journalist

- Born: Ngozi, Ngozi Province, Burundi
- Occupation: Journalist
- Employer: La Nova Burundi
- Criminal charges: Attacking the integrity of the national territory Racial aversion
- Criminal penalty: 18 months imprisonment
- Criminal status: Released

Sandra Muhoza is a Burundian journalist. Working primarily for the online media outlet La Nova Burundi, in 2024 she was arrested after sharing information concerning the government's distribution of weapons, for which she was sentenced to 18 months' imprisonment.

== Career ==
Muhoza lived in Ngozi, Ngozi Province, Burundi. She worked as a journalist for the online news website La Nova Burundi, primarily reporting on governance, security, and human rights issues.

== Arrest, trial and imprisonment ==
On 13 March 2024, Muhoza was arrested while preparing to interview a businessman in Ngozi; the following day, she was taken to the headquarters of the National Intelligence Service in Bujumbura, where she was detained and interrogated for five days before being transferred to Mpimba Central Prison, also in Bujumbura. It was alleged that during her interrogation, Muhoza had been blindfolded, handcuffed, and beaten, and provided only one meal of rice and beans a day.

Muhoza was charged with "attacking the integrity of the national territory" and "racial aversion" after sharing information on a private WhatsApp group about reports that the National Council for the Defence of Democracy – Forces for the Defence of Democracy, the ruling party in Burundi, was providing machetes for members of its youth wing, the Imbonerakure. It was reported that the businessman Muhoza had planned to interview when she had been arrested had links to the CNDD-FDD and the National Intelligence Service. The state prosecutor stated its intent to request a 12-year prison sentence for Muhoza, in addition to a fine of one million BIF.

Muhoza's trial was scheduled to start in September 2024 at the Mukaza High Court, but was postponed until November after it was reported that there was a lack of available fuel to transport Muhaza from Mpimba Central Prison to the courthouse. During her trial, Muhoza's lawyers argued that she had been doing her job as a journalist and had been exercising her right to freedom of expression when sharing the information she had heard on WhatsApp. Giving evidence, Muhoza stated that the impact of the assassination of Melchior Ndadaye, the former President of Burundi, and the subsequent outbreak of the Burundian civil war and ethnic violence on her parents had motivated her to share the information about the procurement of machetes by the CNDD-FDD due to her wish for history not to be repeated.

On 16 December 2024, Muhoza was sentenced to eighteen months imprisonment for "attacking the integrity of the national territory" with a concurrent three month sentence for "racial aversion". Muhoza's lawyer, Prosper Niyoyankana, described the sentence as "unreasonable and motivated by a clear desire to silence anyone who disagrees with the regime".

=== Appeal ===
Muhoza's appeal hearing was scheduled to start on 4 March 2025 but was adjourned twice, to 11 March and then 19 March, due to it being reported that there were no available vehicles to transport Muhoza from prison to the courthouse. On 13 June 2025, the Mukaza Court of Appeal ruled that it did not have jurisdiction to rule on Muhoza's case, due to the alleged crime occurring within Ngozi and not Bujumbura, rendering her initial conviction and arrest warrant null and void. Muhoza was informed of the decision on the same day, but remained detained at Mpimba Central Prison under what her lawyer described as an "illegal warrant".

Muhoza remained in detention despite her successful appeal until her retrial began in October 2025. An appeal hearing scheduled for 13 November 2025 was postponed shortly before it was supposed to start; Muhoza's lawyers criticised this as a further attempt by authorities to keep Muhoza in prison, and stated that her health had declined to the point that she required crutches to walk.

On 14 January 2026, Muhoza was informed that she had been given a four-year prison sentence following a re-trial, in addition to a fine of 200, 000 BIF.

On 4 March 2026, Muhoza was provisionally released on the condition that she remained in Ngozi Province, report regularly to authorities, and not "obstruct the investigation" or "cause scandal by her conduct".

On 13 April, the Ngozi Court of Appeal sentenced Muhoza to six months' imprisonment for "racial aversion". Due to time already served, this marked the end of criminal proceedings against her.

== Response ==
Human Rights Watch described Muhoza as being arbitrarily detained.

Reporters Without Borders condemned the "heavy handed political decision" to charge Muhoza, and called on Burundian authorities to repeal the verdict. It noted that she was the second female journalist to be convicted in Burundi in less than two years after Floriane Irangabiye, who had also been charged with "attacking the integrity of the national territory" in January 2023. In March 2025, RSF included her in their priority campaign together with Frenchie Mae Cumpio of the Philippines, Sevinj Vagifgizi of Azerbaijan and Phạm Đoan Trang of Vietnam. RSF referred Muhoza's case to the United Nations Special Rapporteur on Freedom of Expression and Access to Information, as well as the African Commission on Human and Peoples' Rights. The Mukaza Court of Appeal ruled that the lower court that convicted Mohoza did not have jurisdiction on her case, after which RSF called for her to be released from prison.

The Committee to Protect Journalists called the charges against Muhoza as "deeply unjust" and described it as keeping with Burundian authorities' "history of using baseless anti-state charges to imprison journalists". It later described Muhoza's ongoing detention despite her successful appeal as a "grave injustice" and called on authorities to release her without further delay.

The International Federation of Journalists and its Burundian affiliate, the Union Burundaise des Journalistes, condemned the "disproportionate" charges against Muhoza, describing them as being designed to suppress freedom of expression and hinder the work of Burundian journalists.

The Coalition for Women in Journalism announced that it stood in solidarity with Muhoza and demanded Burundian authorities uphold their international obligations regarding human rights and press freedom.

== See also ==
- Floriane Irangabiye: Burundian journalist similarly charged in 2023
