= Nguyễn Chí Tuyến =

Vietnamese human rights activist (born 1974)

Nguyễn Chí Tuyến (born 1974), also known as Anh Chí, is a Vietnamese human rights activist. He first came to prominence as one of the founding members of No-U FC, an association football club that was founded in protest against China's territorial claims on maritime areas claimed by Vietnam in the South China Sea. He later went on to become an environmental activist and a noted critic of the Communist Party of Vietnam.

== Activism ==
=== No-U FC ===
In 2011, Tuyến protested for the first time following an incident where Chinese patrol boats cut the cables of a Vietnamese ship in the South China Sea. The protest was met with harassment from the police, as well as the mass arrest of protesters, including Tuyến. He subsequently became a founding member of No-U FC, a football club based in Hanoi established in part due to football being legal in Vietnam and met with less hostility from the authorities than protesting. No-U FC was critical of the Communist Party of Vietnam's close relationship and dependence on the Chinese Communist Party, which it felt prevented the Vietnamese government from challenging its Chinese counterpart's claims in the South China Sea, including the Paracel Islands and the Spratly Islands. In addition to its protests against Chinese expansion, through No-U FC, Tuyến also committed charitable acts, including building schools in rural areas of Vietnam and offering support to victims of natural disasters in the country.

=== Anh Chí Râu Đen and AC Media ===
Tuyến was a prolific and prominent user of social media, utilising YouTube and Facebook, where he operated under the pseudonym Anh Chí. His YouTube channel, Anh Chí Râu Đen, produced over 1600 videos on socio-economic issues in Vietnam, and had 98, 000 subscribers as of March 2024, though Tuyến had stopped posting regular videos for unknown reasons in 2022. He subsequently created a second channel, AC Media, which focused on reporting on the Russo-Ukrainian war, and had over 1000 videos and 60,000 subscribers.

Tuyến was critical of the Vietnamese government's inaction towards environmental issues and reported on this on his channels. In 2015, he successful challenged the Hanoi People's Council's plan to fell 6700 trees in the city. In 2016, Tuyến protested waste materials that were being discharged into the sea off Hà Tĩnh by the Taiwanese-owned Formosa Ha Tinh Steel, which had caused the 2016 Vietnam marine life disaster.

Tuyến was also publicly supportive of other human rights activists, including Phạm Đoan Trang and Cấn Thị Thêu. He was a frequent critic of the Communist Party of Vietnam's oppression of pro-democracy activists, and met with international organisations, including a human rights delegation from the European Union in February 2017.

=== 2015 attack ===
Due to his activism, Tuyến has been the victim of police intimidation, harassment, house arrest, bans on international travel, arbitrary detention, and interrogations. Following the creation of No-U FC, Tuyến began to be regularly monitored by the Hanoi Police.

On 11 May 2015, five unidentified men beat Tuyến as he returned to his home in Hanoi after taking his son to school. Tuyến required hospitalisation and stitches for facial injuries stemming from the attack. The attack was reported to have been ordered by the Hanoi People's Council due to his public opposition to its tree-felling plans, as well as his criticisms of the Vietnamese government more generally.

=== 2024 arrest ===
In 2023, Tuyến was interviewed by police about videos he had posted several years earlier on his Anh Chí Râu Đen channel. He was subsequently banned from leaving Vietnam in January 2024 due to an ongoing "security agency investigation". On 28 February, Tuyến was invited to an interview with officers from the Hanoi Police, but did not attend due to feeling unwell. The following day, Tuyến was arrested at his home and charged with conducting "propaganda against the state", in breach of article 117 of Vietnam's penal code. He was ordered to serve four months' detention at Hanoi Detention Centre No. 2 while an investigation was carried out by authorities. His arrest occurred on the same day as two other prominent independent journalists.

==== Response ====
Human Rights Watch criticised Tuyến 's arrest, and the wider crackdown on activists by the Vietnamese government, pointing out that they had occurred just days after the country announced its candidacy for a second term on the United Nations Human Rights Council. The Committee to Project Journalists called on the government to immediately release Tuyến and other imprisoned activists, and for the charges against them to be dropped.

== Personal life ==
Tuyến was born in Mỹ Đức district in what was then North Vietnam, to a family that fought for the People's Army of Vietnam during the Vietnam War. Tuyến lived in Long Biên district of Hanoi, with his wife, Nguyễn Thị Ánh Tuyết, and their children. He worked as a Vietnamese teacher, as well as a translator and editor for Thế Giới Publishers.
