= Frenchie Mae Cumpio =

Filipino political prisoner (born 1999)

- Born: 23 January 1999
- Occupation: Journalist
- Awards: Wallis Annenberg Justice for Women Journalists Award (2026)

Frenchie Mae Cumpio (born January 23, 1999) is a Filipino journalist. She was arrested in 2020 on terrorism related offences and for possessing a firearm. In 2025 the charges against her were beginning to be withdrawn. She is the focus of international attention as a journalist who has been convicted of financing terrorism. Some believe she has been arrested for political motives. On January 21, 2026, Cumpio and activist Marielle Domequil were found guilty of financing terrorism and received a sentence of up to 18 years of jail time. Cumpio had been a target of red-tagging prior to her arrest. Press freedom advocates have described her conviction as a "travesty of justice". In 2026, she was awarded a Courage in Journalism Award by the International Women’s Media Foundation.

== Early life and career ==
Frenchie Mae Cumpio was born in 1999. Cumpio ran a website called Eastern Vista news and she was a news presenter at Aksyon Radyo Tacloban DYVL 819. She is known for covering the killing of farmers in the Philippines and land-grabbing of agricultural lands in Eastern Visayas.

== Arrest and imprisonment ==
On February 7, 2020, she was arrested with four others at the staff house of Eastern Vista in Tacloban, Leyte province. She was charged with terrorism related offenses as alleged members of the New People's Army and possessing a firearm, but activists allege that this was planted by authorities. The activists Alexander Abinguna, Marissa Cabaljao, Mira Legion and Marielle Domequil are called "the Tacloban 5". They were voices of dissent at the time of President Rodrigo Duterte.

According to Reporters Without Borders (RSF), in September 2020 and August 2021 a judge authorized arrest warrants against her despite the fact that she was already imprisoned. Her name was misspelt and the charges were made to her. The warrants were for her alleged involvement in a double murder of two soldiers in October 2019. At that time she was living seven hours away. She was said to have been identified by name by one of the alleged survivors of the attack. The existence of these charges were not known until August 2025 when they were revealed by an "exclusive RSF investigation".

Irene Khan, the United Nations Special Rapporteur on the promotion and protection of the right to freedom of opinion and expression, visited her in jail on January 28, 2024. She said that the terrorism based charges should be set aside. Khan stated that the charges against Cumpio came after months of red-tagging, surveillance, intimidation, and harassment, and appears to have been done in retaliation to her coverage of alleged human rights abuses by the police and the military.

In 2025 she was still imprisoned and her release was demanded by the National Union of Journalists of the Philippines (NUJP). Her release was also named by Reporters Without Borders as one of that years' RWP priority campaigns, together with Sandra Muhoza of Burundi, Sevinj Vagifgizi of Azerbaijan, and Phạm Đoan Trang of Vietnam. Over 250 journalists and media organizations described the charges as "trumped up" and called on the Philippine President to release Cumpio.

In December 2022, the Manila Regional Trial Court ruled to forfeit ₱557,360 that Cumpio and Domequil said belonged to the Stand with Samar-Leyte campaign for farmers. In October 2025, the Court of Appeals reversed the forfeiture and reprimanded the Philippine Anti–Money Laundering Council for the "hasty labeling" of Cumpio and Domequil as terrorists. The Court of Appeals decision stated,

The Court cannot countenance the hasty labeling of human rights advocates as terrorists and the speedy confiscation of their funds and property in the name of national security. Measures to counter terrorism must not be done without due process, and at the expense of individuals, groups, and civil society organizations that are engaged in the promotion and defense of human rights.... To permit the forfeiture of property and funds without strict observance of the guidelines… would erode the public's trust in the state's capacity to manage threats to national security and address the causes of terrorism.

On International Women's Day in 2024, women's media organization International Association of Women in Radio and Television – Philippines called for Cumpio's release.

In October 2025, the Court of Appeals found no evidence to support the allegation that she was in contact with the Communist Party of the Philippines. They reversed a decision to freeze her bank account and an order to pay a fine for allegedly financing terrorists. On November 7th, the Laoang Regional Trial Court (RTC) Branch 21 dismissed the charges of murder against her because the available evidence did not match her identity.

On January 21, 2026, Cumpio and activist Marielle Domequil were found guilty of financing terrorism and received a sentence of up to 18 years of jail time. Cumpio and Domequil were also acquitted on separate charges of possessing firearms and explosives. Cumpio had been a target of red-tagging prior to her arrest. Press freedom advocates have described her conviction as a "travesty of justice". Press freedom and human rights advocates said that Cumpio's case follows a pattern of red-tagging journalists and activists, where activists and media workers who criticize the police and the military are labelled as communists or terrorists supporters. In the 2025 World Press Freedom Index, press freedom in the Philippines is classified as "difficult", with the country ranking 116th out of 180 countries.

Reporters without Borders said that the ruling displayed a "blatant disregard for press freedom". The Committee to Protect Journalists (CPJ) said that Cumpio was the first journalist charged using the anti-terror financing law, saying that "This absurd verdict shows that the various pledges made by president Ferdinand Marcos Jr. to uphold press freedom are nothing but empty talk." One of Cumpio's lawyers said that the anti-terror law was being used "as a ready and convenient weapon against dissenters in this society".

The NUJP said Cumpio's case "has been emblematic of the challenged state of press freedom, and more broadly of freedom of speech and expression, in the Philippines and her conviction does not bode well for the media’s ability to report on the issues that Frenchie did without fear of reprisal and retribution". The International Federation of Journalists (IFJ) condemned the verdict, saying, "The Marcos administration must act now to release Cumpio immediately, and stop the targeting and criminalisation of journalists for their work. The IFJ stands in solidarity with the Filipino media community in their fight for justice for Cumpio and the Tacloban 5."

In Congress, Gabriela Party-list Representative Sarah Elago protested the verdict, saying that there is "overwhelming evidence" showing that the case against Cumpio had been "manufactured". Sixteen embassies in the Philippines belonging to the Media Freedom Coalition also protested the verdict, stating, "Freedom of expression and the ability to report independently are essential pillars of democracy and must be safeguarded".

In March 2026, United Nations experts—Irene Khan, Ben Saul, Gina Romero, Mary Lawlor, and Margaret Satterthwaite—said the conviction "troubling", adding that Cumpio and Domequil should be "free to fight for justice".

Media organizations have criticized Rodrigo Duterte's administration for cracking down on journalists and activists and have criticized the continued detention of journalists under the Bongbong Marcos government. Human rights group Karapatan said that "Under Marcos Jr., the Anti-Terrorism Act of 2020 and the Terrorism Financing Prevention and Suppression Act of 2012 have been aggressively enforced not to protect the public, but to persecute critics and suppress dissent". Human Rights Watch had previously criticized the Anti-Terrorism Act signed by President Rodrigo Duterte in 2020, describing the law as a "human rights disaster in the making" that opens the door to "arbitrary arrests and long prison sentences for people or representatives of organizations that have displeased the president".

== Recognition ==
Cumpio was nominated for the 2025 Reporters Without Borders Prize, Courage Prize category. The prize honors media workers who show "courage in the practice, defense or promotion of journalism in a hostile environment and despite threats to their freedom or safety."

She was nominated for the 2026 UNESCO 2026 Guillermo Cano World Press Freedom Prize by Reporters Without Borders, Committee to Protect Journalists, and Free Press Unlimited (FPU), who cited Cumpio for her courage, defense of press freedom, and commitment to journalism.

In May 2026, Frenchie Mae Cumpio was honored with the 2026 Wallis Annenberg Justice for Women Journalists Award at the International Women's Media Foundation's Annual Courage in Journalism Awards. The Wallis Annenberg award honors journalists who are currently detained or imprisoned.
