= Barbara Cappochin Architecture Prize =

The Barbara Cappochin International Architecture Prize is organised by the Barbara Cappochin Foundation, the Council of Architects, Planners, Landscapers and Conservationists of Padua. It recognises architectural work spotlighting the vital role that architecture plays in the evolution of landscape and quality of life. It has been supported by the UIA since 2005.

== International prize winners ==
Barbara Cappochin International Architecture Prize Winners
| Year | Laureate(s) | Nationality | Work | Ref. |
|---|---|---|---|---|
| 2026 | Natura Futura + Juan Carlos Bamba | Ecuador | Las Tejedoras | |
| 2024 | Miguel Marcelino | Portugal | Casal Saloio - Museum of Rurality | |
| 2022 | H Arquitectes | Spain | Clos Pachem 1507 | |
| 2019 | Fasch & Fuchs | Austria | Federal School Aspern | |
| 2017 | Vin Varavarn | Thailand | Baan Huay Sarn Yaw | |
| 2015 | Grupo Aranea | Spain | El Valle Trenzad | |
| 2013 | Nunzio Gabriele Sciveres | Italy | A2M Social Housing | |
| 2011 | Barozzi Veiga | Spain | Ribera De Duero | |
| 2009 | Hikohito Konishi | Japan | Aikoku Farmhouse | |
| 2007 | Matti Sanaksenaho | Finland | Ecumenical Chapel | |
| 2005 | Jun Igarashi | Japan | Kaze no wa-wind circle | |
| 2003 | Enrico Franco | Italy | Casa Cavazzana | |
