= Phạm Đoan Trang =

Vietnamese writer and activist

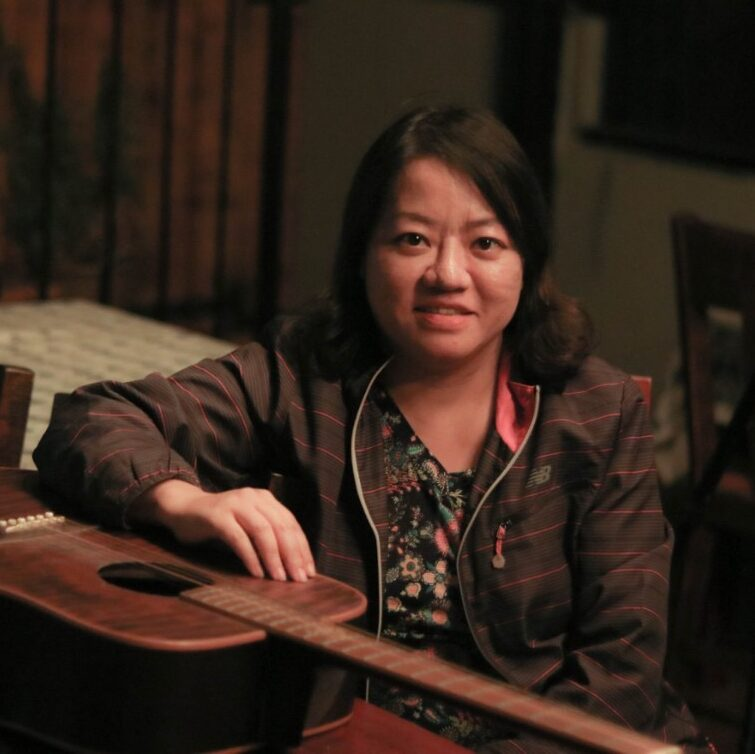
- Trang in 2022
- Born: May 27, 1978 (age 48); Hanoi, Vietnam
- Education: Foreign Trade University (graduated in 2000, International Economics)
- Occupations: author, journalist, activist
- Website: www.phamdoantrang.com

Phạm Thị Đoan Trang (born May 27, 1978) is a Vietnamese author, blogger, journalist, and activist. She is the founder of various independent organizations such as Green Trees, Luat Khoa magazine and the Liberal Publishing House. She received numerous prizes in recognition of her work in advocating and defending human rights in Vietnam, including the 2017 Homo Homini Award, the 2019 Press Freedom Award by Reporters Without Borders, the 2022 Martin Ennals Award, and the 2022 CPJ International Press Freedom Awards.

From 2000 until 2013, Trang worked for Vietnamese state media outlets before shifting to human rights advocacy in Vietnam. She has written and published books addressing issues such as LGBTQ+ rights, women's rights, environmental issues, land rights, political prisoners, democracy, and human rights. Because of these activities, she was repeatedly harassed by the authorities and had to live in hiding within Vietnam. She was formally arrested by the Vietnamese authorities in October 2020 and sentenced to nine years in prison in December 2021 on charges of "propaganda against the state" amid protests from international civil society organizations and foreign government agencies.

== Life and career ==
=== Early life and education ===
Phạm Đoan Trang was born on May 27, 1978, in Hanoi in a family of three children. Her parents are high school chemistry teachers, and her brothers work in state institutions in Vietnam. According to Trang, feelings of sadness and grief for her parents were a major motivation for her to become an activist "with the desire to change the country." She finished high school at Hanoi–Amsterdam High School then graduated Foreign Trade University in 2000 majoring in international economics. She also graduated with an MBA from the School of Management, Asian Institute of Technology in Hanoi.

=== 2000–2013: Working in state media ===
In 2000, she started working at the newspaper VnExpress. In 2002, she started working at Vietnam Digital Television Network. In 2006, she created a blog called "Trang the Ridiculous"; originally intended for learning English, she later used the blog to publish stories that would not be widely available in mainstream media. Her blog has covered a wide range of topics such as the environment, corruption, geopolitics, democracy, and human rights. According to People in Need, her blog is visited by approximately 20,000 people a day. According to The Vietnamese, in March 2007, Trang stopped working at VTC and began work at the newspaper VietNamNet as the journalist and editor for the specialty page Vietnam Weekly, where she discusses territorial disputes between Vietnam and China at the South China Sea. In 2008, she and journalist Hoàng Nguyên wrote the book “Bóng” – Tự truyện của một người đồng tính (transl. Glass – Biography of a Gay Man) based on the story by Hoàng Văn Dũng – a member of a Vietnamese group about homosexuality. This is considered the first book on male homosexuality in Vietnam, and was a best seller at the time.

In late August 2009, during her time at VietNamNet, she was arrested for allegedly "violating national security". However, the editor-in-chief of VietNamNet denied her arrest was for her articles in the newspaper. Some of her articles on VietNamNet were also blocked. She was released on September 6 and stopped working for VietNamNet in September. (Note: Radio Free Asia stated that Trang was fired because she wrote blogs to "present her own thoughts on current affairs." The Vietnamese states that she was fired without notice. According to Trang, her contract with VietNamNet have ended since August 31, 2009.) According to Trang, she was detained because the police misunderstood that she was involved in printing T-shirts with messages protesting the Central Highlands Bauxite Project and affirming sovereignty over Hoang Sa and Truong Sa, but she believes this could also be related to her writings on "sensitive political topics."

In February 2010, she started working for the newspaper Pháp luật Thành phố Hồ Chí Minh, where she chose to limit posting her unpublished and pre-censored articles for the newspaper to her blog to maintain good working relations with her editors, which she had done during her time working at VietNamNet. In 2012, she became a journalism trainer for the Institute for War and Peace Reporting (IWPR). According to IWPR, she had mentored "dozens of young writers in professional and international reporting" and training locations are regularly changed and kept secret. In the same year, she was one of the four candidates for the Outstanding Writer award, organized by her newspaper.

In December 2012, she was detained while reporting on an anti-China protest in Ho Chi Minh City. She was reportedly taken to a rehabilitation camp for commercial sex workers, where she was interrogated by a group of seven officials. After her release, she asked another activist to upload the recording she secretly made while in detention online. The recording was posted on January 13, 2013, and quickly became viral, according to Trang. In the same day, police officials raided her newspaper's office and threatened its editor-in-chief with "national security-related" charges. She fled the country to avoid reprisal and imprisonment from the authorities. Under pressure from the authorities, Pháp Luật Thành Phố Hồ Chí Minh fired her for "leaving work without prior notification". From 2000 to 2013, Trang said that she had worked in at least ten different state newspapers.

=== 2013–2015: In exile ===
In 2013, Trang secretly left Vietnam for the Philippines. In exile, she often wrote for Vietnam Right Now, an English website "dedicated to exposing human rights abuses and press freedom violations in Vietnam", and the blog Dân làm báo. She also worked part-time training journalists with the Vietnamese exile-run nongovernmental organization VOICE. In the same year, she co-founded the Network of Vietnamese Bloggers, and was one of the signatories of the network's Declaration 258, which calls on the government and the United Nations Human Rights Council to “review” provisions of Article 258, which had been criticized for its vagueness and arbitrariness. After Trang participated in handing over the declaration to several international organizations in Bangkok, Thailand, Radio France Internationale reported that the police showed up at her mother's residence under the witness of blogger Le Thien Nhan.

In January 2014, Trang and a few other activists started lobbying for human rights in Vietnam in the United States, Canada, and Switzerland ahead of the second Universal Periodic Review of the United Nations to assess the human rights situation in Vietnam since the first review in 2009. In the same year, she accepted an invitation to study public policy at the University of Southern California under the Feuchtwanger scholarship of Villa Aurora. In November 2014, she co-founded Luat Khoa, an independent magazine which aims to help Vietnamese learn about law, the constitution, and their rights. In 2017, the magazine incorporated as a non-profit in the United States under the name Legal Initiatives for Vietnam and releases the English version of the magazine called The Vietnamese. The non-profit also provides training and resources to journalists in Vietnam to produce their own work.

=== 2015–2020: Continuing activism in Vietnam ===
In 2015, Trang returned to Vietnam after finishing the 10-month course in the United States. Upon return, security forces detained Trang at Tan Son Nhat airport for 15 hours to ask her questions relating to "national security." It is unclear whether she was subjected to an exit ban, as according to Trịnh Hữu Long, co-founder of Luat Khoa, “her passport has not been confiscated, nor has she attempted to leave the country”. (Note: According to Human Rights Watch, the Vietnamese government does not publish a travel ban list or proactively notify those on the list. Activists would only know they are subject to a travel ban when are stopped at airports or border gates, or when they renew their passports.) In the same year, she was one of the founders of Green Trees, (Note: Formerly Vì một Hà Nội Xanh (transl. For a green Hanoi).) an independent non-profit civil society organization working primarily on environmental protection. The organization was founded in response to plans to fell thousands of historic trees in Hanoi. In April 2015, Trang was assaulted during an environmental protest in Hanoi, causing her to walk with a limp.

In 2016, Trang documented and reported on the Central Vietnam marine life disaster. Her organization, Green Trees, drafted a report titled An Overview Of The Marine Life Disaster In Vietnam which addresses many issues surrounding the environmental disaster. The report was sent to Vietnamese National Assembly delegates on October 19, one day before the 2nd session of the 14th National Assembly convened. In the same year, she was invited to meet the president of the United States Barack Obama during his 2016 visit to Hanoi on May 24. Fearing the police would stop her if she traveled by plane, she decided to travel by car from Ho Chi Minh City, where she was receiving medical treatment, to Hanoi. However, she was detained for 24 hours at a hotel in Ninh Bình. Security officials reportedly denied the reason for her arrest was related to the meeting with President Obama, instead claiming that it was due to "writings on her Facebook page."

On November 16, 2017, Trang, along with activists Nguyễn Quang A, Bùi Thị Minh Hằng, and Nguyễn Chí Tuyến met with a European Union delegation to discuss the human rights situation in Vietnam. During the meeting, Trang is said to have provided the EU delegation with updated reports on the human rights situation in Vietnam, the marine life disaster in Central Vietnam, and the state of religious freedom in the country. After the meeting, Trang, Nguyễn Quang A and Bùi Thị Minh Hằng were detained by security forces. Trang was released evening of that day and was placed under "house arrest". Since 2017, she was forced to move between various cities to evade surveillance from the authorities. According to Amnesty International, she cannot settle at a location for more than a month.

In September 2017, Trang published Politics for the Common People (Vietnamese: Chính trị bình dân), a book that educates the Vietnamese public about politics. Described as a textbook, it discusses the concept of democracy, rule of law and separation of powers while promoting the idea of politics "from below". The book was highly praised by activists in Vietnam for its content, writing style, and its relevancy to the situation in Vietnam. The book was considered politically sensitive in Vietnam: it is reported that customs agents in Da Nang had confiscated copies of the book in February 2018. In the same month, Trang was detained and questioned for approximately 23 hours about the book and was kept under house arrest after release. She later went into hiding.

In August 2018, while attending the performance of "A Memory of Saigon" by singer and activist Nguyen Tin at the Casanova tea room in Ho Chi Minh City, Trang was detained by several "uninvited guests," a group of uniformed law enforcement officers, security personnel, and many people in plain clothes, who took her to a vehicle outside the venue as the audience was leaving, according to Human Rights Watch. According to an eyewitness account, Trang was the "most severely beaten audience". Trịnh Hữu Long, Trang's coworker, stated that she was taken to the police headquarters of Ward 7, District 3, where she was reportedly beaten during interrogation. After the interrogation, she was dropped off on a dark street to order a taxi. It is reported that after the police dropped her off, six men on three motorcycles approached and assaulted her using their helmet, leading to her hospitalization. According to Trang, those who visited her at the hospital was harassed by the police. According to The Vietnamese magazine, the concert was disrupted because the police may have suspected Trang to use the event to distribute her book, and materials deemed “anti-state”. The assault left her with a hand injury.

In 2019, Trang co-founded the Liberal Publishing House (Vietnamese: Nhà xuất bản Tự Do), an independent publishing house operating outside of censorship from the Vietnamese government. The Liberal Publishing House has published her samizdat books such as Politics for the Common people, A Handbook for Families of Prisoners, Non-Violent Resistance, Đồng Tâm Report, and Fighting Impunity. Among these, A Handbook for Families of Prisoners, published in May, was considered the first book in Vietnam for families with incarcerated relatives. In July, the publishing house announced it will giveaway 1,000 copies of Non-Violent Resistance; according to Trang, 1,000 copies of the book were distributed to readers within 4 days. In the same year, Trang publishes the book Politics of A Police State, which combines the content of her two previous works. The book also described the harassment she suffered as a writer and activist. In June 2020, the publishing house was awarded the International Publishers Association's IPA Prix Voltaire.

In January 2020, Trang and other activists published the first edition of the 28-page Đồng Tâm report in English; the report is said to shed light on the land clash in Dong Tam on January 9, 2020. The second edition, in English and Vietnamese, was published on February 9, 2020. The third edition, in 128 pages, considered the most comprehensive, was published on September 25, 2020. In July 2020, the Liberal Publishing House published a Vietnamese edition of the book Fighting Impunity: A guide on how civil society can use Magnitsky Acts to sanction human rights violators from Safeguard Defenders, translated by Trang. The book shows how the Magnitsky Act can be used to "punish human rights violators." (Note: Safeguard Defenders later announced the book on December 2020.) In the same month, she announced her withdrawal from the Liberal Publishing House, citing an increase in harassment from the authorities.

== Arrest and imprisonment ==
On October 6, 2020, hours after the conclusion of the 24th annual US-Vietnam human rights dialogue, Trang was arrested in Ho Chi Minh City; she was later brought to Hanoi for further investigation. The authorities charged Trang with "conducting propaganda against the State of the Socialist Republic of Vietnam" and "making, storing, spreading information, materials, items for the purpose of opposing the State of the Socialist Republic of Vietnam." Fellow activist Pham Thanh Nghien stated that shortly before her arrest, Trang and she had met with the U.S. Consulate in Ho Chi Minh City to report on several actions they considered to be human rights violations in Vietnam, particularly regarding the land dispute in Dong Tam. The publication of the Đồng Tâm report amid the upcoming party congress in January 2021 were considered likely reasons for her arrest.

Fellow activist Will Nguyen posted on Twitter a letter in Vietnamese and English that Trang asked him to release upon her arrest. In the letter dated May 27, 2019, titled Just in case I am imprisoned..., Trang called on her friends to lobby for new electoral laws and new laws governing the National Assembly, promoting her books, and using her imprisonment to negotiate and exert pressure on the Vietnamese government. She also asks the community to take care of her family and requested her guitar be sent to her in jail.

Phil Robertson from Human Rights Watch called the arrest a "scorched-earth response" to political dissent, calling it a "grave injustice that violates Vietnam’s international human rights commitments and brings dishonor to the government”. Amnesty International considers her a prisoner of conscience and advocate for her unconditional release, while stating that she is at "grave risk of torture". Ming Yu Hah, Deputy Regional Director for Campaigns at Amnesty International, called the arrest "outrageous". Peter Kraus vom Cleff, president of the Federation of European Publishers, sent a letter to the vice-president of the European Commission Valdis Dombroskis and some members of the European Parliament demanding intervention to secure Trang's freedom. Additionally, the U.S. Embassy in Hanoi expressed concern over the arrest, saying it "could impact freedom of expression" in Vietnam.

On October 25, 2021, the United Nations Working Group on Arbitrary Detention released an opinion about Trang's arrest. It states that her arrest and detention was arbitrary: the arrest was carried out without an arrest warrant and Trang was not informed about the charges against her. According to the opinion, she was not allowed to meet her relatives and her access to a lawyer has been delayed. (Note: Trang was able to meet her lawyer on October 19, 2021.) The opinion stated that Trang had been detained incommunicado for over 11 months and that she should be released immediately and unconditionally. During her detention, Trang's lawyers stated that her health had declined due to improper medical checkups and treatment. On October 26, 2021, 28 non-governmental organizations issued a joint statement demanding her unconditional release.

On December 14, 2021, (Note: The trial was scheduled on November 4, but was postponed because it is reported that prosecutors involved in the case are infected with COVID-19 and have been quarantined.) the Hanoi People's Court sentenced Trang to 9 years imprisonment after a single-day trial. According to the indictment, Trang was accused of unlawfully storing three documents in English, one in Vietnamese, and also gave interviews to BBC News Vietnamese and Radio Free Asia. The prosecutors alleged that Trang had "distorted the authorities' leadership and policies" and "defamed the government" through her interviews and documents. The sentence was criticized by the United Nations and the diplomatic missions of the United States, Canada, United Kingdom and France. Non-governmental organizations, including the International Publishers Association, Human Rights Watch and Amnesty International have criticized the conviction. On August 25, 2022, the High People's Court in Hanoi rejected Trang's appeal and upheld her 9-year sentence. Reports since October 2022 have indicated that Trang was transferred to a prison in Bình Dương province, approximately 1,600 kilometres (990 mi) away from her family in Hanoi.

In 2025, numerous non-profit organizations advocated for her early release. A joint statement signed by 21 civil society organizations on October 6, 2025, called on international organizations to advocate for the unconditional release of Trang and other journalists and writers, while also ensuring her mental and physical health and safety, allowing her access to independent and adequate medical care, legal counsel of her choice, and weekly video calls with her family. Earlier on May 27, 2025, four international organizations had called for similar measures, also demanding that the Vietnamese authorities cease threatening the freedom of expression of writers, journalists, dissidents, and their families. The statements also noted that Trang's health had deteriorated significantly: she suffered from lingering effects of COVID-19 contracted in prison, chronic sinusitis, arthritis, and gynaecological issues. In the same year, her release was named by Reporters Without Borders as one of that year's priority campaigns together with Sandra Muhoza of Burundi, Sevinj Vagifgizi of Azerbaijan and Frenchie Mae Cumpio of the Philippines.

== Awards and recognition ==
Trang has received many awards from non-governmental organizations and governmental bodies. In 2018, Trang was awarded the Homo Homini Award by the Czech-based human rights organisation People In Need. She was lauded for using "plain words to fight the lack of freedom, corruption and the despotism of the communist regime". She initially refused the award, but later accepted after persuasion from the organization and learning the fact that the award does not include monetary prizes. Trang requested an employee from a Czech-based airline to receive the award on her behalf. The same year, she received the Vietnam Human Rights Award from the Vietnam Human Rights Network. In 2019, Trang received the Press Freedom Prize for Impact from Reporters Without Borders. She did not go to Berlin to receive the award for concerns over difficulties she may face with security officials when leaving and entering the country. Trịnh Hữu Long, editor-in-chief for Luat Khoa, accepted the award on Trang's behalf.

Trang continues to receive awards during her imprisonment. In 2021, she became an honorary member of PEN Germany. In 2022, she received the Martin Ennals Award, becoming the first rights activist from Vietnam to receive this award. She received many awards in the same year, including the CPJ International Press Freedom Award, International Women of Courage Award from the United States Department of State and the Canada-United Kingdom Media Freedom Award. In 2024, Trang received the Barbey Freedom to Write Award by PEN America. In 2025, she received the PEN Tucholsky award and was named in the "10 Most Urgent Cases" list published annually by the One Free Press Coalition. In 2026, she received the Disturbing the Peace Award to a Courageous Writer at Risk by Vaclav Havel Center.

== Published books ==
- Hoàng, Nguyên; Phạm, Đoan Trang (2008). "Bóng" - Tự truyện của một người đồng tính [Glass – Biography of a Gay Man] (in Vietnamese). Văn học Publishing House.
- Phạm, Đoan Trang (2011). "Còn lại tình yêu" [There's only love left]. Thế hệ F [Generation F]. Liên Mạng Publishing House.
- Phạm, Đoan Trang (co-author) (2012). Việt Nam và tranh chấp Biển Đông [Vietnam and the South China sea dispute] (in Vietnamese). Hà Nội: Nhà xuất bản Tri thức. p. 233. LCCN 2014309135. OCLC 898750301.
- Phạm, Đoan Trang (2012). Và quyền lực thứ tư [And the fourth estate]. Giấy Vụn Publishing House.
- —— (2014). Căn bản về truyền thông và báo chí [Basic Techniques of Journalism and Communication].
- —— (2016). Anh Ba Sàm [Brother Ba Sàm]. Nhà xuất bản Trẻ Hà Nội. ISBN 978-1-5303-5764-2.
- —— (2016). Từ Facebook xuống đường [From Facebook down to the streets] (1 ed.). Hoang Sa Publishing House. ISBN 978-1-5333-4662-9.
- Phạm, Đoan Trang (co-author) (2016). A Report on the Marine Life Disaster in Vietnam. Green Trees. ISBN 978-1-5395-9534-2.
- —— (2017). Chính trị bình dân [Politics for the Common People]. Giấy Vụn-Green Trees Publishing House. ISBN 978-1-5484-6656-5.
- ——; Trịnh, Hữu Long; Nguyễn, Anh Tuấn (2018). Học chính sách công qua chuyện đặc khu [Learning public policy through the Special Economic Zones project] (in Vietnamese). Luật Khoa tạp chí. p. 100.
- —— (2019). Cẩm nang nuôi tù [A Handbook for Families of Prisoners]. Liberal Publishing House.
- —— (2019). Politics of a Police State. Luật Khoa, Liberal Publishing House, Giấy Vụn, Green Trees.
- —— (2019). Phản kháng phi bạo lực [On Non-Violent Resistance Techniques]. Liberal Publishing House.
- ——; Nguyễn, Will (2020). Báo cáo Đồng Tâm [Dong Tam Report]. Liberal Publishing House.
- Safeguard Defenders (2020). Tội ác phải bị trừng phạt: Hướng dẫn áp dụng Luật Magnitsky để trừng phạt kẻ vi phạm nhân quyền [Fighting Impunity: A guide on how civil society can use Magnitsky Acts to sanction human rights violators]. Translated by Phạm, Đoan Trang.
