= Trần Đức Thạch =

Vietnamese political prisoner (b. 1952)

Trần Đức Thạch (born June 19, 1952) is a Vietnamese author, human rights activist and prisoner of conscience. Thạch was a veteran of the Vietnam War and a former member of the People's Army of Vietnam. Thạch is known for his poems, articles and reports that condemn corruption, injustice and human rights violations in Vietnam. Currently imprisoned, he is expected to be released in 2032.

== Activism ==
Thạch is known for writing about the war crimes committed by the People's Army of Vietnam during the Vietnam War. Thạch was a witness to these war crimes, especially the Tân Lập massacre in Đồng Nai in April 1975. He has written a novel, poems, articles and reports that condemn corruption, injustice and human rights abuses.

Since 1975, Thạch has been repeatedly harassed by the Vietnamese authorities. His first arrest and conviction was in September 2008, where Thạch had served a three-year jail term for "conducting propaganda against the Socialist Republic of Vietnam" under Article 88 of the Penal Code.

After his first prison term, Thạch continued his campaigning against the Vietnamese authorities.

Thạch co-founded the pro-democracy group the Brotherhood for Democracy with lawyer and former political prisoner Nguyễn Văn Đài in 2013. The group mainly campaigns for human rights on social media, but has been suppressed by the Vietnamese government. His second arrest was in April 2020 at his home for "activities aimed at overthrowing the government".

== 2020 arrest and sentence ==
On April 23, 2020, Thạch was arrested by about 20 plainclothes police officers at his home in Nghệ An province. Thạch was charged with subversion under Article 109 of the 2015 Criminal Code.

During his arrest, Thạch was not allowed to meet with his family and lawyer. Only three months after his arrest, his wife Chuong Nguyen was allowed to see her husband on July 9.

His family has been rejected to visit Thạch and are not informed on his state of condition. In June 2021, Thạch was transferred from Nghi Kim Detention Center in Nghê An province to Prison Camp 5 in Thanh Hóa province. His family was not notified about this transfer.

His expected release is on April 23, 2032.

In July 2026, Thạch's wife filed an urgent petition requesting authorities allow her husband to seek treatment at a hospital for eye problems.

== International response ==
In September 2020, Human Rights Watch urged the Vietnamese authorities to drop the charges and immediately release Thạch.

In December 2020, PEN America called for the immediate release of Thạch and in April 2021, they released a statement in support of Thạch on the first anniversary of his arrest.

In August 2021, the wife of Thạch, Chuong Nguyen and three other wives of political prisoners in Vietnam wrote an open letter to U.S. Vice President Kamala Harris. In this letter, they requested Kamala, who was meeting the officials during her trip to Vietnam, to pressure the Vietnamese government to release their husbands. This open letter was co-signed by 60 Viet-American pro-democracy, religious, media and community organizations.

In November 2022, the Working Group on Arbitrary Detention of the United Nations deemed the detention and arrest of Thạch to have been arbitrary.
