= Julia Mengolini =

Argentine journalist

- Born: 2 May 1982 (age 44); Bariloche, Argentina
- Occupations: Lawyer; Journalist; TV anchor
- Years active: 2006–present
- Partner: Federico Vázquez (2016–present)

Julia Mengolini is an Argentine journalist and lawyer. She works on radio and television on topics such as gender perspective, social justice and environmentalism.

== Awards ==
=== Nominations ===
- 2018 Martín Fierro Digital
  - Native Digital Radio
