= Hanoi Architectural University =

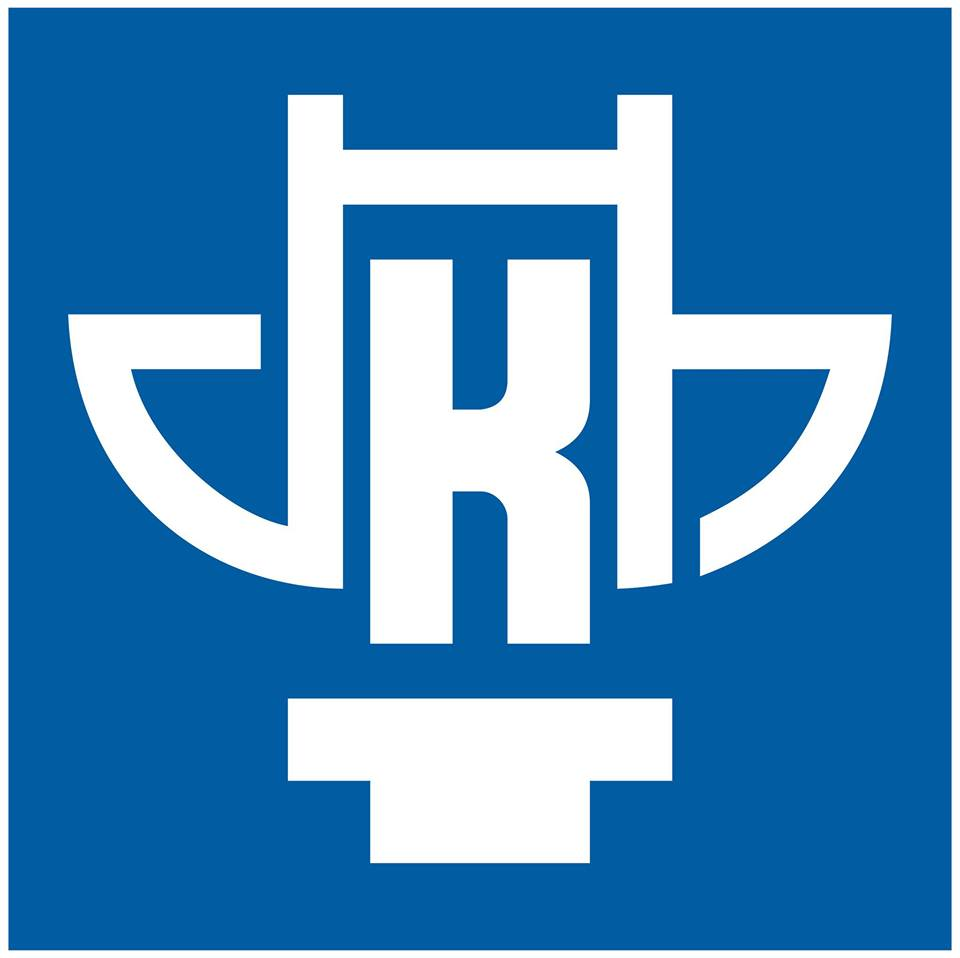
- Type: Public university
- Established: 1969
- Chancellor: Do Dinh Duc, PhD
- Faculty: 800
- Undergraduates: 6000
- Postgraduates: 400
- Location: Hanoi, Vietnam; 20°58′50″N 105°47′23″E
- Website: hau.edu.vn
- Location within Vietnam

Hanoi Architectural University (also known as Hanoi University of Architecture; Vietnamese: Đại học Kiến trúc Hà Nội) is the flagship university in architecture, planning, and civil engineering education and research in Vietnam. It was established in 1969 under the administration of Vietnam Ministry of Architecture (now the Vietnam Ministry of Construction). The school's predecessor was the Architecture Faculty of Hanoi University of Construction. Hanoi Architectural University is considered one of the best and largest universities in architecture, urban planning, and civil engineering in Vietnam. The school offers five-year bachelor's degrees (B.Eng. and B.Arch.), two-year master's degrees, and PhD degrees.

== Organizations ==
=== Schools ===
1. School of Architecture
2. School of Urban and Regional Planning
3. School of Structural and Construction Engineering
4. School of Urban Infrastructure and Environmental Engineering
5. School of Urban Construction Management
6. School of Industrial Fine Arts

=== Departments ===
1. Department of Marxist - Leninist Philosophy
2. Department of Postgraduate
3. Department of In-service Training

=== Research Institutes ===
- Institute of Tropical Architecture
- Center for Urban Infrastructure Technology
- Center for Urban Research and Education
- Center for Construction and Project Management
- Center for Hydraulic Research
- Center for Environmental Studies

=== Other Centers ===
- Office of Consultancy and Construction Technology
- Construction and Urban Development, Inc.
- Library Information Center
- Service Centers

== Alumni ==
- Nguyễn Lân Thắng – blogger and human rights activist.
