= Les (given name) =

- Gender: Unisex

Other names
- Related names: Lester, Leslie, Lesley

Les is a given name, usually short for Lester or Leslie. Also, a romanization of Ukrainian name Лесь [ˈlɛsʲ]. Notable people with the name include:

- Les Abbott (1885–1947), Australian rules footballer
- Les Abbott (rugby league) (1915–2011), Australian rugby league footballer and administrator
- Les Adams (politician) (born 1974), American politician and judge
- Les Adams (rugby league) (1909–1945), GB & England international rugby league footballer
- Les Afful (born 1984), English footballer
- Les Allan (1927–2013), Scotland international rugby union player
- Les Allen (born 1937), English footballer and manager
- Les Allen (Australian footballer) (1911–1989), Australian rules footballer
- Les Allen (musician) (1902–1996), Canadian musician
- Les Amery (1934–1999), Australian rules footballer
- Les Ames (1905–1990), English cricketer
- Les Ames (footballer) (1912–1998), Australian rules footballer
- Les Aspin (1938–1995), American politician
- Les AuCoin (born 1942), American politician
- Les Baxter (1922–1996), American musician and composer
- Les Besser (born 1936), American electronics engineer
- Les Binks (1951–2025), Northern Irish heavy metal drummer
- Les Blank (1935–2013), American documentary filmmaker
- Les Brown (bandleader) (1912–2001), American jazz musician and bandleader
- Les Brown (speaker) (born 1945), American motivational speaker and politician
- Les Claypool (born 1963), American rock bassist and founding member of Primus
- Les Costello (1928–2002), Canadian ice hockey player and Catholic priest
- Les Crane (1933–2008), American broadcaster and talk show host
- Les Darcy (1895–1917), Australian boxer
- Les Dawson (1931–1993), English comedian
- Les Dennis (born 1953), English television presenter
- Les Dodd (born 1954), English snooker player
- Les Eaves (born c. 1967), American businessman and state legislator
- Les Edwards (born 1949), British illustrator
- Les Elgart (1917–1995), American jazz trumpeter and bandleader
- Les Ferdinand (born 1966), English football coach and former player
- Les Fradkin (born 1951), American guitarist and composer
- Les Gleadell (1921–2009), Falkland Islands civil servant
- Les Goble (1932–2019), American National Football League player
- Les Gold (born 1950), American pawnbroker and media personality
- Les Gray (1946–2004), English singer and songwriter
- Les Green (1941–2012), English footballer and manager
- Les Greenberg (born 1945), Canadian psychologist
- Les Guthman, American filmmaker
- Les Hull (born 1935), Canadian politician
- Les Humphries (born 1940), Founder of the Les Humphries Singers
- Les Kaufman, evolutionary ecologist, Professor of Biology at Boston University
- Les Kurbas (1887–1937), Ukrainian movie and theater director. Considered to be one of the lead figures of the Executed Renaissance
- Les McCann (1935–2023), American soul jazz and R&B pianist and vocalist
- Les McKeown (1955–2021), Scottish pop singer, lead singer of the Bay City Rollers
- Les Mills (born 1934), New Zealand shot putter, discus thrower and politician
- Les Munro (1919–2015), New Zealand Air Force pilot
- Les Owen (speedway rider) (1939–2004), English international speedway rider
- Les Palmer (American football) (1923–2006), American National Football League player
- Les Paul, stage name of American jazz guitarist and inventor Lester William Polsfuss (1915–2009)
- Les Podervianskyi (born 1952), Ukrainian painter, poet, playwright and performer
- Les Reed (disambiguation), multiple people
- Les Sealey (1957–2001), English footballer
- Les Serdyuk (1940–2010), Soviet and Ukrainian theater and film actor
- Les Shannon (1926–2007), English football player and manager
- Les Stroud (born 1961), Canadian filmmaker and survival expert, creator, writer, producer, director, cameraman and host of the television series Survivorman
- Les Tanyuk (1938–2016), Ukrainian theater and film director, dissident and politician
- Les Tremayne (1913–2003), British radio, film, and television actor

== Fictional characters ==
- Les Battersby, a fictional character in Coronation Street
- Les Nessman, a fictional character in WKRP in Cincinnati

== See also ==
- Les (disambiguation)
- Les (surname)
