= Les =

LES or Les may refer to:

== People ==
- Les (given name)
- Les (surname)
- L.E.S. (producer), hip hop producer

== Space flight ==
- Launch Entry Suit, worn by Space Shuttle crews
- Launch escape system, for spacecraft emergencies
- Lincoln Experimental Satellite series, 1960s and 1970s

== Biology and medicine ==
- Lazy eye syndrome, or amblyopia, a disorder in the human optic nerve
- The Liverpool epidemic strain of Pseudomonas aeruginosa
- Lower esophageal sphincter
- Lupus erythematosus systemicus

== Places ==
- The Lower East Side neighborhood of Manhattan, New York City
- Les, Catalonia, a municipality in Spain
- Leş, a village in Nojorid Commune, Bihor County, Romania
- Les, the Hungarian name for Leșu Commune, Bistriţa-Năsăud County, Romania
- Les, a village in Tejakula district, Buleleng regency, Bali, Indonesia
- Lesotho, IOC and UNDP country code
- Lès, a word featuring in many French placenames

== Transport ==
- Leigh-on-Sea railway station, National Rail station code
- Leytonstone tube station, London Underground station code

== Other uses ==
- "L.E.S.", a song by Childish Gambino from Camp (album)
- Lake-effect snow
- Large eddy simulation in fluid dynamics
- Law Enforcement Sensitive, a US security classification
- Leave and Earnings Statement, of US military
- Les (Vietnam), a Vietnamese term for lesbians
- Les+ Magazine, a Chinese LGBT magazine
- Licensing Executives Society International, a US intellectual property organization
- Life Extension Society, a cryonics organization
- Lifetime Entertainment Services, a US company
- Lilliput Edison screw, a 5mm light bulb socket
- Louisiana Energy Services, which operates the National Enrichment Facility
- A Slang term for Lesbian
