= Leslie Reid =

Leslie Reid may refer to:

- Leslie Reid (equestrian)
- Leslie Reid (artist)

== See also ==
- Les Reed (disambiguation)
