= My Best Gay Friends =

2012 Vietnamese web series

- Title card
- Genre: Sitcom
- Country of origin: Vietnam
- Original language: Vietnamese
- No. of episodes: 13

Production
- Running time: 20 – 35 minutes

Original release
- Network: YouTube
- Release: April 8, 2012 – March 8, 2016

My Best Gay Friends (Vietnamese: Bộ ba đĩ thõa, roughly translated as The Slutty Trio) is a Vietnamese web series which premiered on YouTube in April 2012. It was developed by openly gay film student Huỳnh Nguyễn Đăng Khoa, who directed, wrote, produced, and starred in the series. It centers around the lives of three young gay housemates who share an apartment in Ho Chi Minh City. Considered to be the first gay sitcom in Vietnam, it garnered a following, receiving approximately two million views per episode despite being made on a small budget.

== Synopsis ==
The series revolves around the lives of three twenty-something men who share an apartment. Khoa, a college student, was forced to live away from his family so that he can learn to become independent. By chance, he found and rented a room in the apartment where Rje was living, and was soon joined by Nhật. Rje operates a stall selling bún bò (rice vermicelli) at a market, while Nhật has a mysterious past.

The humor in the series arise from the daily lives of the perpetually broke young people who live away from their families, in situations at school, at work, in relationships, but involving gay, lesbian, bisexual, and transgender characters. Khoa is always unsuccessful in love, but he is always looked after by his good friends. Rje and Nhật vie for the affections of BB Trần, one of Khoa's classmates, while Rje is being pursued at work by a delivery boy. A subplot of the series involves Nhật coming to terms with his past.

== Cast ==
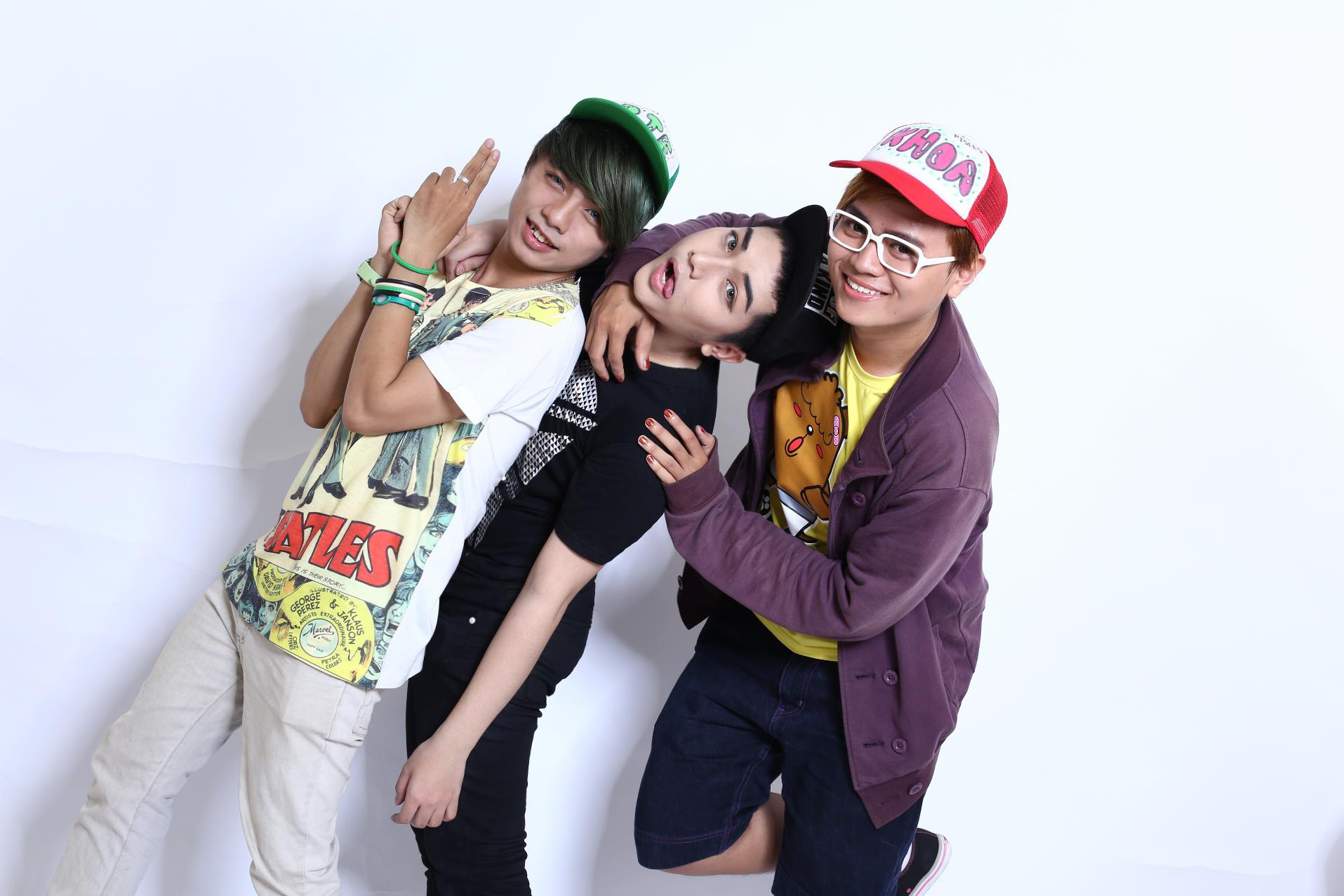
L–R: Rje, Nhật, and Khoa in a promotional photo

=== Main ===
- Huỳnh Nguyễn Đăng Khoa (Khoa Loi Nhoi) as Khoa, a college student who was forced to live independently by his family
- Trần Nguyễn Kim Hân (Rje Kaj) as Hân (Rje), the owner of the shared apartment who operates a bún bò stall at a market
- Ngô Xuân Nhật (Đới Mộng Mộng) as Nhật, a mysterious young man and the third person sharing the apartment

=== Supporting ===
- Minh Thành as Thành, Khoa's schoolmate
- Tống Minh Khang as Tonỳ, a delivery boy at the market where Rje works; he is interested in Rje
- Magic Quyên as Khoa's mother

=== Guest ===
- BB Trần as himself, Khoa's schoolmate and the handsome man being pursued by Rje
- Cindy Thái Tài as herself
- Khả Như as My's mother, appeared unexpectedly at her wedding in episode 9

== Production ==
=== Development ===
According to director Huỳnh Nguyễn Đăng Khoa, he developed the series after hearing his friend and eventual co-star Trần Nguyễn Kim Hân recount his "weird and amusing" experience after coming out. He wanted to portray gay people in a more realistic way, unlike the negative images he often see in Vietnamese films and comedies. He said, “It’s not right. I’m gay and I see my life as very normal. That’s why I want to bring true images of homosexuals to everyone to change their perspective on us.” He plans to make 15 episodes in total.

=== Casting ===
Most of the cast and crew are friends of director Đăng Khoa; most of them belonging to the LGBT community in Vietnam, while the rest are straight allies.

=== Filming ===
My Best Gay Friends was filmed using a Canon EOS 600D DSLR camera and a tripod. Each episode lasts about 20 minutes and takes about 2 to 3 days to film and edit. Each costs about 1 million VND (50 USD) to create, mostly borne by Đăng Khoa and friends. The crew typically film on location, such as at school, on a bus, or at a market, so they are sometimes ejected from their filming locations.

Episode 9 of the planned 15-episode series deals with the issue of same-sex marriage. When a lesbian wedding at a restaurant was cancelled, due to being "against Vietnamese tradition and customs", Cindy Thai Tai (the first openly transgender person in Vietnam) intervened, and the wedding was held at a different venue, to the delight of the couple's friends and family present.

== Reception ==
When it debuted, the series created a "fever" online, attracting many viewers and was widely shared on Facebook. The initial response from the LGBT community was largely positive, and many asked to take part in the series. Many episodes have more than a million views, and the newest episode already received more than half a million views. Filmed using a DSLR camera, it has impressed audiences with its high-quality images.

The series has received support from many online fans; a typical YouTube comment read "I feel a lot of sympathy, and admiration, towards the friendship and love they show for each other. I think they live a more beautiful life than ordinary people." However, other comments expressed discomfort with depictions of same-sex marriage and concerns about the viability of same-sex relationships.

The film debuted during a time when Vietnamese society is rapidly changing its view towards LGBT issues, while the Vietnamese government is considering legalizing same-sex marriage, but it's unclear how much My Best Gay Friends had helped. "I thought it would only interest Vietnam's gay community - but we're hearing that parents, grandparents, whole families watch and love the shows and long for new episodes," said the director. As a result of the series, the main actors have become popular teen idols. Trần Nguyễn Kim Hân, who plays Rje Kaj, actually works at the bun bo stand featured in the series. The stand has become somewhat of an attraction as fans often ask for Hân or take pictures or ask for autographs when he is there. It also has increased business there. It is actually owned by Hân's mother, who has expressed her support for the show and her son's sexual orientation. The series was described as "exposing a world of homosexuals that is fun, funny, and healthy." However, because their sexual orientation became public as a result of the series, the actors sometimes face opposition. Ngô Xuân Nhật, who plays one of the three roommates, was condemned by his neighbors and relatives, but supported by his mother, after his sexuality became known.

Despite its online popularity, the director has no plans to broadcast the series on television due to its "rather sensitive" subject matter.

== Sequel ==
Following a 7-year hiatus, the second season of the series was announced at the talk show event "Tự tin bản sắc chính mình" (Confident in your own identity) on the 10th anniversary of the series' broadcast held at Léman Luxury Apartments, Ho Chi Minh City on September 16, 2023. The return was thank you to the audience, as well as a message to society to have a more positive view of the LGBTQ+ community.
