= LGBTQ rights in Vietnam =

- Vietnam
- Legal status: Legal
- Gender identity: Transgender person can change legal gender after sex reassignment surgery
- Military: Lesbian, gay and bisexual people may serve openly
- Discrimination protections: Sexual protection in the provision of goods and services for transgender people

Family rights
- Recognition of relationships: No recognition of same-sex unions
- Adoption: No

Lesbian, gay, bisexual, and transgender (LGBT) rights in Vietnam have expanded in the 21st century; while LGBTQ+ people still face legal challenges not experienced by non-LGBTQ residents.

Female and male forms of same-sex sexual activity between consenting adults are legal and have never been criminalized in Vietnamese history. Same-sex couples and households headed by same-sex couples are ineligible for the legal protections available to heterosexual couples. Vietnam provides limited anti-discrimination protections for transgender people. (Note: Article 4, Decree 01/VBHN-BYT prohibits discrimination against people who has undergone sex reassignment. Article 35, Decree 176/2013/NĐ-CP establishes monetary fine of 2,000,000 to 5,000,000 Vietnamese dong for those engaging in discriminatory acts against transgender people, while Article 155 of the 2015 Penal Code specified a sentence of probation up to 3 years for repeated violation.) The right to change genders was officially legalized in Vietnam after the National Assembly passed an amendment to the Civil Code in 2015.

The Vietnamese Penal Code indicates that the age of consent is 16 years, regardless of gender or sexual orientation.

Vietnam's first annual gay pride parade took place in Hanoi on 5 August 2012. In 2017, pride parades were held in around 34 other cities and provinces.

== History ==
A supplemental text to the 15th-century Code of Hồng Đức mentioned the trial of two women who lived in the same house and had sex with one another while the husband of one of the women was away.

There was a discrepancy in legal enforcement in pre-colonial Vietnam as the state was unable to enforce measures into practice; hence little to no known actions were ever taken by the state against homosexuality compared to the West.

== Recognition of same-sex relationships ==
In July 2012, the Minister of Justice announced that the Government of Vietnam had started a consultation on whether to legalize same-sex marriage. In June 2013, the Ministry of Justice submitted a bill that would remove the ban on same-sex marriage from the Law on Marriage and Family (Vietnamese: Luật Hôn nhân và Gia đình) and provide some rights to cohabiting same-sex couples. The National Assembly debated it in October 2013.

On 24 September 2013, the Government issued a decree abolishing the fines on same-sex marriages. The decree took effect on 11 November 2013.

In November 2013, the National Assembly approved a new constitution. Article 64 was repealed and replaced by article 36 which reads: "Men and women have the right to marry and divorce. Marriage must adhere to the principles of voluntariness, progressiveness, monogamy, equality and mutual respect between husband and wife".

On 27 May 2014, the National Assembly's Committee for Social Affairs removed provisions giving legal status and some rights to cohabiting same-sex couples from the bill submitted by the Ministry of Justice. The bill was approved by the National Assembly on 19 June 2014, and took effect on 1 January 2015. It states that while Vietnam allows symbolic same-sex weddings, same-sex couples are neither recognized nor protected under the law. It does not allow same-sex partnership either, although the issue has been open for discussion during many house meetings. While Vietnam abolished its ban on same-sex marriage, the law has a very limited effect in practice. If not recognized by the state, such marriages will not be protected by law for matters such as personal and property rights. Jamie Gillen, a National University of Singapore sociology researcher, stated that Vietnam's relaxation of stance contrasts with Vietnam's neighbors such as Singapore. It is estimated that such relaxed policies will attract tourism revenue as Vietnam attempts to promote themselves as a tolerant and friendly society.

== Transgender rights ==
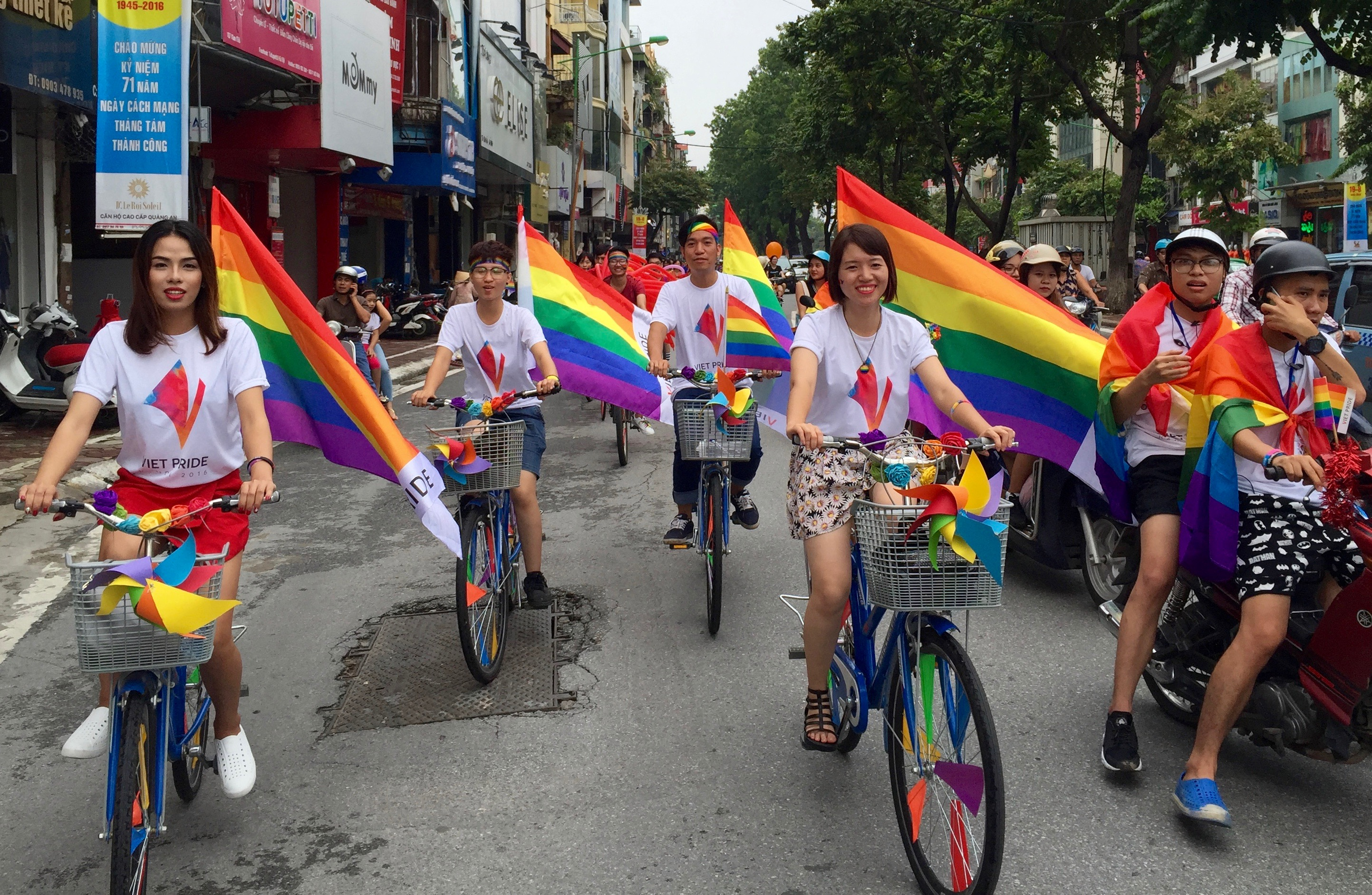
Participants at Viet Pride 2016

In 2017, the Ministry of Health estimated that Vietnam's transgender population was at 270,000-300,000 people. In March 2019, a survey conducted by local transgender associations found there were nearly 500,000 transgender people in the country.

A 2018 study revealed that 67.5% of surveyed transgender people suffered psychological issues and that around 60% had attempted suicide, 23% of were "forced to have sex with others", 16% had suffered sexual violence, and 83% had experienced humiliation.

On November 24, 2015, Vietnam passed a landmark law by a vote of 282–84, enshrining rights for transgender people in a move, advocacy groups say, paves the way for sex reassignment surgery. Such operations were previously illegal, forcing people to travel to nearby Thailand for the surgery. The legislation allows those who have undergone sex reassignment to register under their preferred sex. The law went into effect in January 2017. For that law to be fully enforced, a further bill needs to be passed, meaning it hasn't come into effect, so the transgender community has no protection from discrimination. This bill covers the requirements for gender change applicants and the requirements for those performing it. In November 2018, speaking at a transgender rights event, the Vietnam's Union of Science and Technology Associations and Nguyễn Huy Quang, head of the Department of Legislation at the Ministry of Health, announced that the National Assembly was expected to discuss the bill in 2020.

On April 10, 2023, lawmaker Nguyễn Anh Trí put forward a proposal to the Standing Committee of the National Assembly to create the new Gender Affirmation Law (formerly known as Gender Identity Law). He said the law would show that Vietnam values protecting vulnerable communities and “leaving no one behind in its policies”. The proposed law would allow people the right to change gender identity, request a different gender identity to the one assigned at birth, the right to choose a medical intervention method for gender-reaffirming surgery, and also strictly prohibit any form of discrimination and false information against transgender individuals, their families and relatives. In a feedback document the day before presenting the proposal, Trí said the government had outlined its support for the proposed legislation. In May 2023, the bill has been accepted by the Standing Committee of the National Assembly. On June 2, 2023, the bill has been approved to be included in the legislative agenda of the National Assembly for 2024, and was supposed to be discussed during its session in October 2024 and voted on in the May 2025 session. On September 13, 2024, the Standing Committee of the National Assembly announced the removal of the bill from its 8th plenary session, and stated that it would be needing further consultations from the government and the lawmaker Nguyễn Anh Trí himself.

According to the provisions of the recent Law on Citizen Identification that comes into effect on July 1, 2024, transgender citizens are allowed to change their ID card when undergoing gender transition, and must present a number of confirmation documents and papers. In order to be legally allowed to do so, the Gender Affirmation Law has to be passed first by the National Assembly.

== Military service ==
In Vietnam, conscription is mandatory for able-bodied men aged 18–25 (18–27 for those attending colleges/universities), while other individuals can voluntarily serve within the Armed Forces when 18 years old and above; regardless of sex or sexual orientation.

== Conversion therapy ban ==
Since the 3rd of August, 2022, Vietnam has reportedly outlawed conversion therapy with the passing of Dispatch No. 4132/BYT-PC by the Vietnamese Ministry of Health. The bill was aimed at "correcting medical examinations practices regarding LGBTQ+ individuals" and "mandating the enhancement of public communication and dissemination among medical facilities nationwide to assist medical staff and patients alike in better understanding LGBTQ+ individuals".

The bill emphasizes and declares that "homosexuality, bisexuality, and (the state of being) transgender are not illnesses", and that "LGBTQ+ individuals may not and cannot have "treatment" be forced upon them, nor have their sexuality be interfered", instead advising that psychological support be carried out for queer individuals by those with an understanding of gender identity.

== Public opinion ==
In 2001, a survey found that 82% of Vietnamese believed homosexuality "is never acceptable".

In 2007, Ho Chi Minh City Pedagogical University conducted a poll of 300 pupils at three junior high and high schools and discovered that 80% of pupils answered "no" when asked, "Is homosexuality bad?"

A March 2014 poll indicated that 33.7% of Vietnamese supported same-sex marriage, whereas 53% were opposed.

An online survey carried out from December 2015 to January 2016 found that 45% of respondents supported the legalization of same-sex marriage, while 25% opposed it and 30% answered "don't know".

A June–September 2023 Pew Research Center poll showed that 65% of respondents supported same-sex marriage (30% "strongly" and 35% "somewhat"), while 30% opposed (14% "strongly" and 16% "somewhat"). Support was highest among Buddhists and Christians at 71%, and lowest among the religiously unaffiliated at 59%. When divided by age, support was highest among 18–34-year-olds at 79% and lowest among those aged 35 and above at 57%.

The 2024 Viet Nam Provincial Governance and Public Administration Performance Index survey showed that public support for same-sex marriage in Vietnam has risen to 66.8% in 2024.

== Living conditions ==
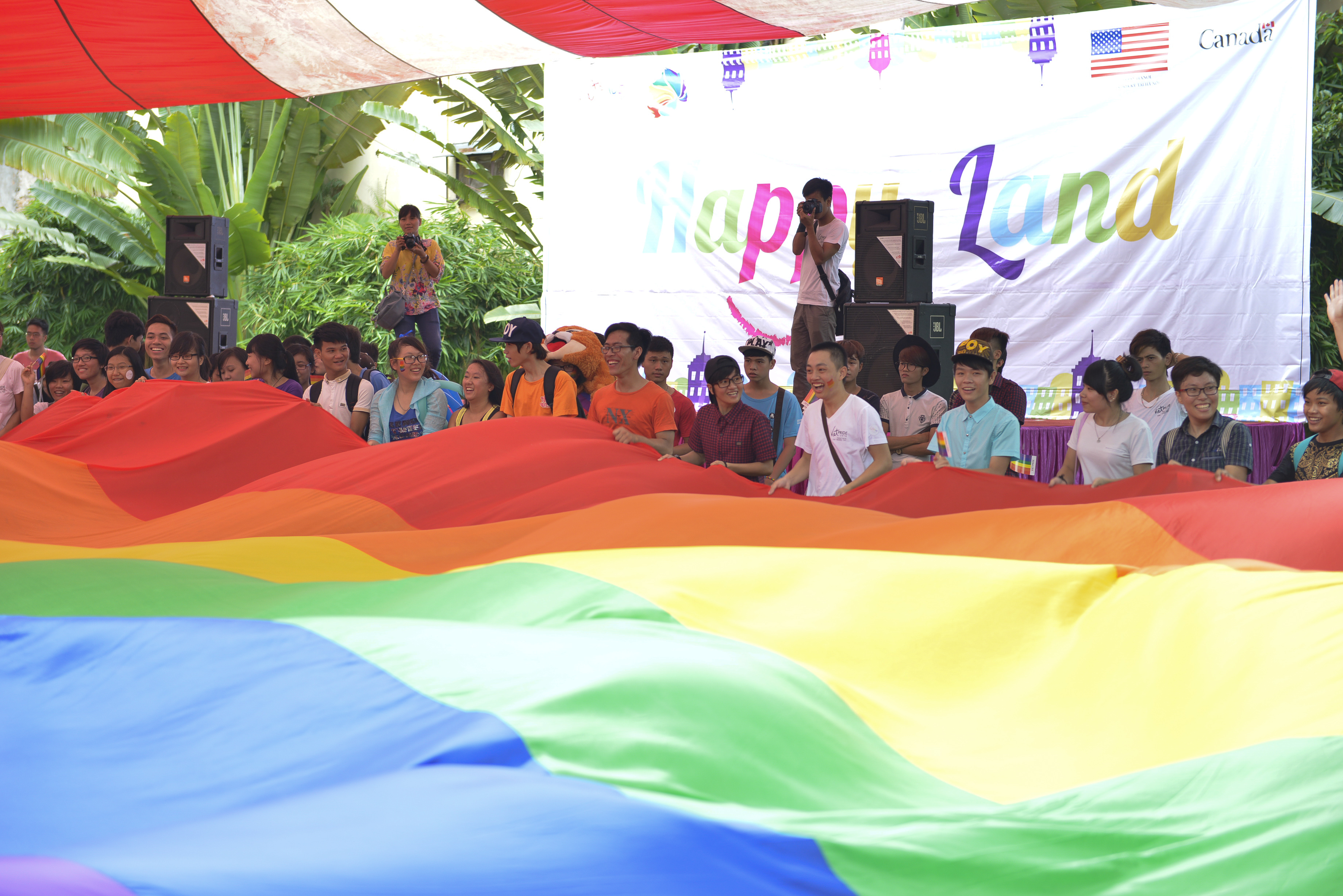
Participants at the 2014 Viet Pride parade

The 2014 Viet Pride Campaign
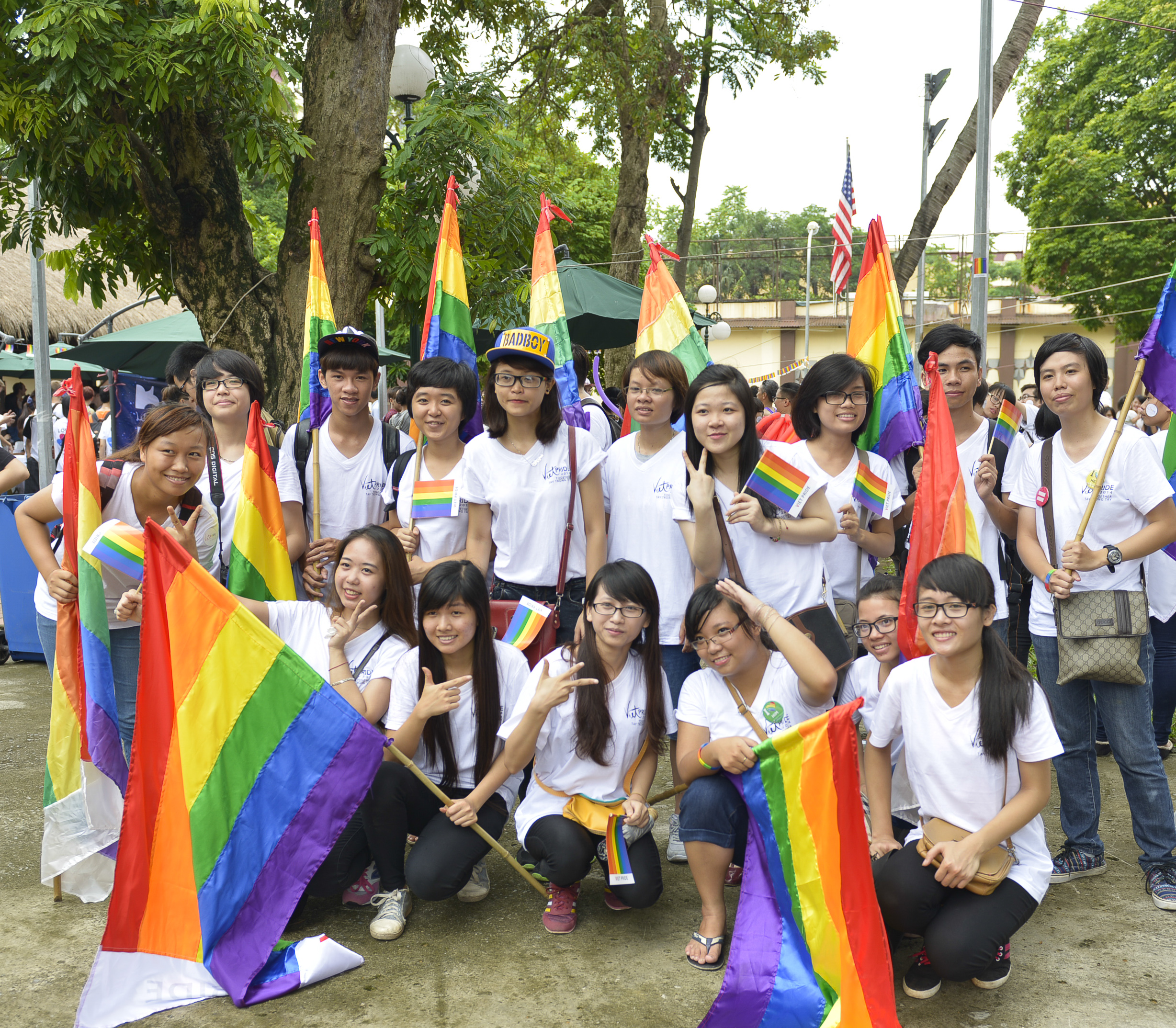
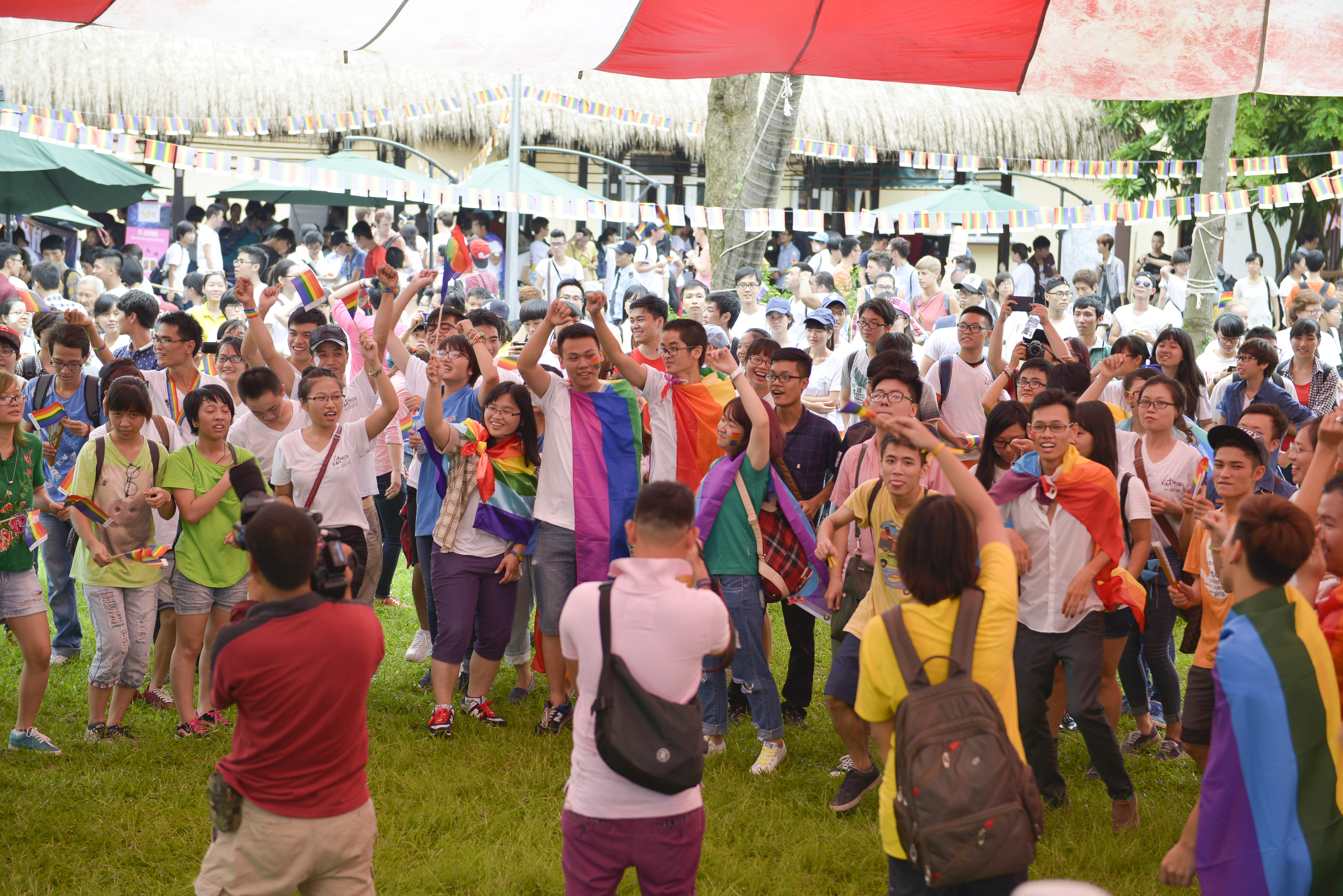

In 2002, the Ministry of Labour – Invalids and Social Affairs declared homosexuality to be a "social evil" comparable to prostitution, gambling and illegal drug use and promised that legislation would be forthcoming to allow the government to combat homosexuality and arrest same-sex couples. Publications such as Thế Giới Phụ Nữ and Tiếp thị & Gia đình spoke of homosexuality as a disease and "deviant behavior that is incompatible with the good morals and time-honored customs of Vietnam." In November 2002, the Communist Youth Newspaper carried a story about homosexuality that stated "some people are born gay, just as some people are born left-handed".

On 29 November 2007, the first foreign same-sex wedding was held in Hanoi between a Japanese and an Irish national. The wedding raised much attention in the gay and lesbian community in Vietnam.

In 2009, Pham Le Quynh Tram became the first transgender woman to be legally recognized by Vietnamese authorities as a woman. As such, she was allowed to redefine her sex from male to female and to legally change her name to Pham Le Quynh Tram. According to a report from the Huffington Post, her official recognition was apparently withdrawn in January 2013.

In September 2010, Tuoi Tre Online, the internet edition of the Tuoi Tre newspaper, published a letter from an 18-year-old reader describing his hard time dealing with family after they found out he was gay. The letter received hundreds of supportive responses from other readers that led the website to conclude it with an interview with Dr. Huynh Van Son, Dean of Psychology, at the Ho Chi Minh City Pedagogical University. For the first time, a major state media agreed that "homosexuality is normal".

Another ceremonial same-sex wedding between two Vietnamese citizens, Quốc Khánh and Thành Lợi, was held in Haiphong in northern Vietnam in June 2018.

On 5 August 2012, Vietnam's first gay pride parade took place in Hanoi, with participants expressing support for equal marriage rights for LGBT individuals.

In 2013, Vietnamese filmer Dang Khoa, produced a sitcom entitled My Best Gay Friends. The series is published on YouTube as Vietnamese broadcasters were reluctant to air the episodes. Khoa wanted to create the show to debunk the caricature stereotypes of homosexuality.

Madam Phung's Last Journey (2014) is a documentary film about a transgender band directed by Tham Nguyen Thi. Another movie is Finding Phong (2015), directed by Tran Phuong Thao and Swann Dubus.

A 2015 study revealed that around 44% of Vietnamese LGBT students aged 14–22 faced stigma, discrimination and violence because of their identities. Another 2015 study conducted by UNESCO found that 19% of students perceived bullying against LGBT students as "harmless". 70% of Hanoi parents said they would not allow their children to talk to gay students, and some believed that conversion therapy could help "cure" LGBT children. A 2014 USAID report showed that 54% of LGBT students said their school was not safe, with many dropping out. Of those who experienced violence, one third said they thought about committing suicide, with half of those attempting it. 85% of transgender students stated they dropped out because of assault and bullying.

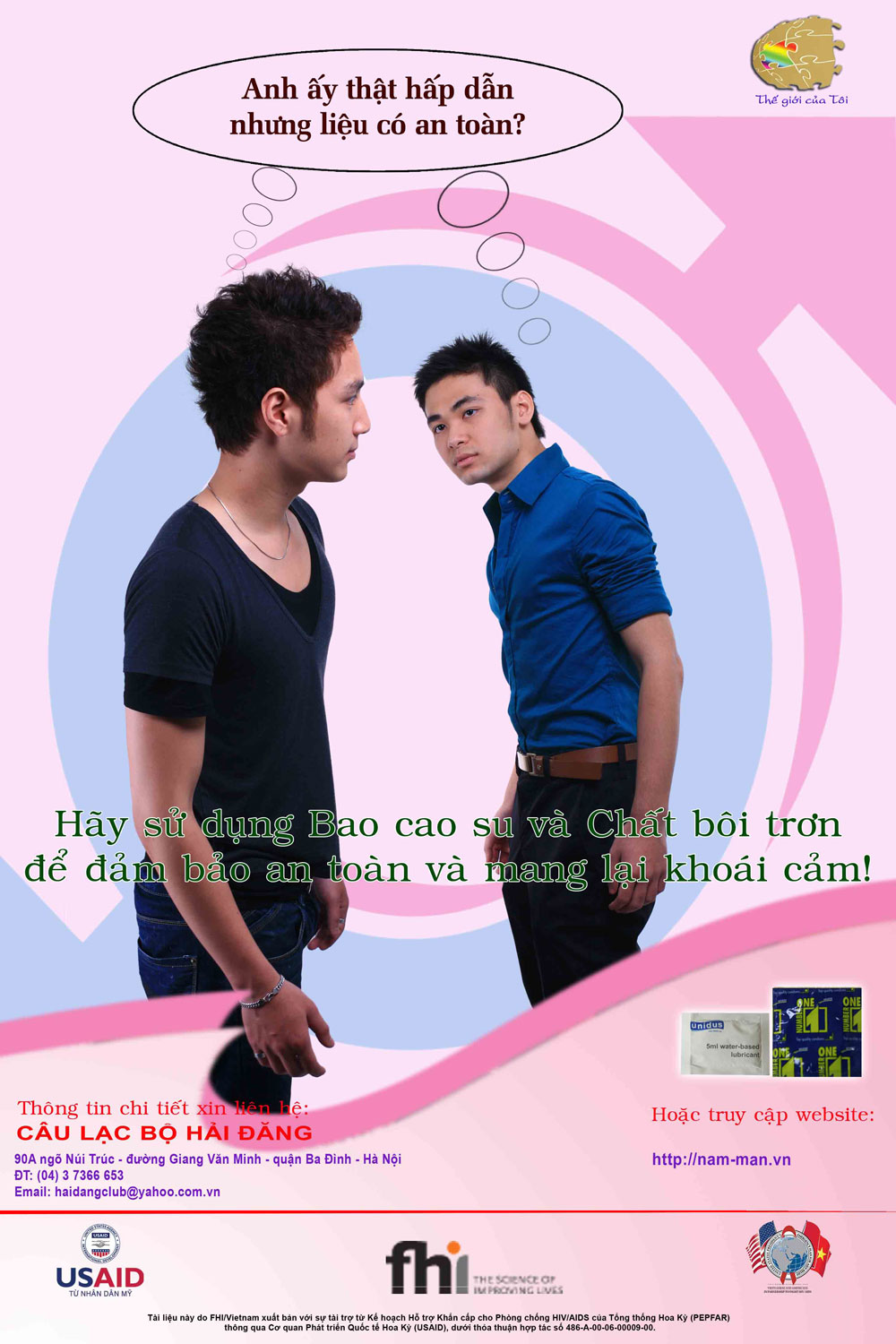
HIV/AIDS-prevention poster advocating for safe MSM sex in Vietnam

Former American Ambassador to Vietnam, Ted Osius, was openly gay and known for his support of LGBT rights in Vietnam, and attended several pride events with his husband.

From 18 September 2017 to 24 September 2017, Vietnam's Hanoi Pride took place for a fifth consecutive year. The event hosted thousands of people, compared to only about a hundred at the first pride parade. Irish drag queen Panti Bliss attended the event. The sixth Hanoi Pride took place in November 2018, and saw the participation of more than 1,000 people. The parade uniquely involves supporters and participants peddling on their bikes to campaign for transgender rights and same-sex marriage in the country. Over 35 similar events are held each year throughout Vietnam, including in the cities of Haiphong, Thanh Hóa, Da Nang, Qui Nhơn, Nha Trang, Vũng Tàu, Ho Chi Minh City and Cần Thơ. The events were aired by several Vietnamese television channels, namely VTV4, VTV6 and VTV9.

=== HIV/AIDS ===
In 2006, the Government enacted legislation to protect citizens infected with HIV and people living with AIDS from discrimination, and health care is provided free to all Vietnamese citizens.

== Summary table ==
Same-sex sexual activity legal	Yes (Always legal)
Equal age of consent (16)	Yes (Always equal)
Anti-discrimination laws in employment only	No
Anti-discrimination laws in the provision of goods and services	Yes / No (For transgender people only)
Anti-discrimination laws in all other areas (incl. indirect discrimination, hate speech)	No
Civil unions	No
Same-sex marriage	No
Recognition of same-sex couples	No
Adoption for single people regardless of sexual orientation	Yes
Stepchild adoption by same-sex couples	No
Joint adoption by same-sex couples	No
Gay, lesbian and bisexual people allowed to serve openly in the military	Yes
Transgender people allowed to serve openly in the military	
Legal recognition of non-binary gender	No
Gender self-identification	No
Right to change legal gender	Yes
Right to have gender-reassignment surgery	Yes (Since 2017)
Homosexuality declassified as an illness	Yes (Since 2022)
Transgender identity declassified as an illness	Yes (Since 2022)
Legal recognition of intersex people	No
Intersex human rights	No
Conversion therapy banned	Yes / No (Since 2022) Only medical professionals are barred from practicing conversion therapy
Access to IVF for lesbians	Yes
Commercial surrogacy for gay male couples	No (Explicit ban regardless of sexual orientation)
MSM allowed to donate blood	Yes

== See also ==
- Recognition of same-sex unions in Vietnam
- Les (Vietnam)
