= I Do campaign =

Social media campaign to call for support of same-sex marriage in Vietnam

"I Do campaign" (Vietnamese: Chiến dịch Tôi đồng ý) is a social media campaign launched by The Institute for Studies of Society, Economy and Environment (iSEE) and the ICS Center to call for the support of Vietnamese people for same-sex marriage in the country. The campaign was first held in 2013 in the context of the XIII National Assembly of Vietnam bringing up the issue of same-sex marriage for discussion.

== "I Do" campaign 2013 ==
In this context, according to ICS, 2,000 gay and lesbian people were surveyed and 71% of them wanted the law to allow them to marry, with 25% wanting to register to live together. At the same time, during the XIII National Assembly session of Vietnam in 2013, the Vietnamese Parliament was considering bringing up the issue of same-sex marriage for discussion. In response, the I Do campaign was first launched online from October 13 to October 27, 2013, by groups and organizations supporting same-sex marriage in Vietnam. In the first three days of its launch, the campaign's official Facebook page had over 8,500 likes.

At the I Do festival held in Hanoi in late October, singer Thu Minh announced her support for the campaign, becoming the first artist to publicly support the campaign. The singer shared, "Equality in life is something that you deserve to have." The festival attracted 2,000 attendees, and the total number of electronic signatures collected by the campaign was 47,000 signatures calling for the legalization of same-sex marriage in Vietnam.

At the end of the campaign, on November 12, 2013, Vietnam officially repealed the law banning same-sex marriage. However, Article 8 of the 2014 Vietnamese Marriage and Family Law still clearly states that "The state does not recognize marriage between people of the same sex." At the same time, a total of 80,000 people followed the campaign's official Facebook page, 12,000 signatures were sent to the Vietnamese National Assembly, 5,000 photos and 200 videos were posted in support of the campaign.

== "Non-Molded Marriage" campaign 2022 ==
On August 10, 2022, the "I Do" campaign was relaunched with the theme "Non-Molded Marriage" by iSEE and the ICS Center. The campaign was launched just one week after the Vietnamese Ministry of Health issued a circular calling for the protection of LGBTQ+ people's access to healthcare. Similar to the "I Do" campaign in 2013, the 2022 campaign continues to call for support for same-sex marriage with a goal of collecting 250,000 signatures online, along with 18 artists and journalists in Vietnam as media ambassadors. In addition, the 2022 campaign will also organize workshops with students at 10 universities in Vietnam and launch the first book on the topic of same-sex marriage.

According to the organizers, more than 250,000 signatures in support were received within 72 hours of opening the online signature portal. After 3 days of announcement, the campaign claimed to have received about 1,000,000 online signatures. However, a few days later, the organizers announced that the signature website was attacked by hackers, causing the number of signatures to spike, and requested participants to verify their signatures by sending confirmation via email. As of November 20, 2022, the organizers' Facebook page confirmed that about 40,000 signatures were valid.

== See also ==
- Recognition of same-sex unions in Vietnam
- Miss International Queen Vietnam
