= Cindy Thái Tài =

Vietnamese singer and actor

Cindy Thái Tài (born Nguyễn Thái Tài, 27 January 1971) is a Vietnamese singer and actress. In 2005, she underwent sex reassignment surgery at Yanhee International Hospital in Thailand. Afterwards, she became a singer in her home country, releasing albums in 2006 and 2007. She has also appeared on My Best Gay Friends, a Vietnamese web series. She was the first Vietnamese person to publicize herself as a transgender.
