= Les (Vietnam) =

Vietnamese term for lesbian, queer woman, or female homosexual

Les is a colloquial Vietnamese term of identification for more globally common labels like lesbian, queer woman, or female homosexual. It is derived mainly from scholarship by Vietnamese-American ethnographer Natalie Newton, who is, at present, the only Western scholar to have centred Vietnam's les as her subject of investigation. Her articles have been frequently cited as reference or point of entry to issues concerning Vietnamese queer communities.

As a research topic, Vietnamese homosexualities have only recently garnered scholarly interest. A large majority of scholarship has been produced in the 2010s, not allowing much time for significant historical evolution or reinterpretations. Hence, besides Newton and a handful of other academics, scholarship on homosexuality and LGBT issues in Vietnam is limited. Consequently, research on the demographic subset of Vietnam's les is even rarer. However, the relative lack of sources might in fact productively and aptly explain the conditions of life and kinship for Vietnamese les.

In fact, scholarly neglect mirrors, and can even be attributed to, the marginalization of les due to the intertwined, compounded discriminations against both women and homosexuality. In her writing, Newton echoes the observation that the lack of direct scholarship on Vietnamese les strongly suggests that their agential forms of self-identification and community formation obliquely eludes homophobic interpellations and institutions. Therefore, instead of focusing on global liberal structures and discourses that similarly attempt to interpellate, define, and identify les, such as gay marriage laws, LGBT rights in Vietnam, or NGO activity, this entry will focus on les personal identifications and kinship structures, and how they differ from definitions imposed on them by governing macro-structures.

== Governing structures and regimes ==
=== European modernity ===
Nineteenth century European modernity, in the forms of French colonialism, European gender values, and medical discourses on sexology, has significantly impacted the present-day treatment of Vietnam's les. Further examination of the influence of these external regimes will provide useful historical insight and possible explanations for the current stigmatisation of female homosexuality in Vietnam.

French colonialism influenced and imposed changes in Vietnamese socio-cultural norms, thus elucidating how and why Vietnamese gender values changed over time. Frank Proschan historically explores French colonial constructions of Vietnamese gender. Through his analysis of gendered and sexually ambiguous figures like the eunuch and effeminate boys, Proschan argues that "the colonials were confounded by the Vietnamese sex/gender system," in which they perceived no distinguishable characteristics between men and women. To the French, the Vietnamese did not conform to European gendered idea(l)s and naturalized, normative behaviour that was properly attributed to the respective genders.

According to French gender norms, "cultivated and civilized" women were expected to be "corseted and gowned", creating a seductive hourglass figure indicative of sexual fecundity. In contrast, Vietnamese women were deemed to be lacking in femininity because of their squarish build and narrow hips. Furthermore, they dressed like men, undertook "the most difficult of masculine labours", and had repulsive blackened teeth from chewing betel and smoking cigarettes. Vietnamese men were, by comparison, seen as universally effeminate and lacking masculinity. By European standards, the Vietnamese were backwards and uncivilized people because of their indistinct and androgynous gender presentations.

In his examination of historical perceptions of male and female homosexuality in Vietnam, Richard Tran also explores the impact of nineteenth-century European medical discourses on the development of Vietnamese sex and gender values. Through extensive archival analysis, Tran shows how male and female homosexuality in Vietnam was synonymous with gender-crossing, or more specifically, the transgression of heterosexual gender norms through the manifestation of physical or psychological attributes of the opposite gender. Male effeminacy and female masculinity are examples of gender-crossing.

Tran argues that the figure of the 'gender-crosser' was constructed and pathologized by two factors: the Vietnamese state and late nineteenth-century European sexological discourses that permeated Vietnamese society during the period in question. This section will focus on the latter discourse.

According to Tran, nineteenth-century European sexology was defined by two overarching lexica: anatomical and psychiatric. Both contributed to the solidification of 'gender-crossing' discourse, which was pervasive in France. In the first instance, medical scientists would "search the body for visible proof" of functioning sexual genitalia (or lack thereof). Masculine women, effeminate men, and hermaphrodites were therefore deemed to have "blurred or indistinguishable" sexual features.

In psychiatric discourse, anatomical and physiognomic abnormalities were mapped onto psychological deviances. A popular psychiatric theory was inversion, which claimed that weak mental faculties gave rise to homosexual desires. Together, these European medical regimes pathologized and invalidated homosexualities. Most importantly, both paradigms appeared frequently in Vietnamese historical sources, likely through French colonial transmission, contextualizing the current marginalisation of Vietnamese les and queer communities.

As evidenced in Proschan and Tran's historical studies, European colonial, socio-cultural, and scientific modernity fundamentally altered gender norms in Vietnam. Prior to the arrival of European colonial modernity, "Vietnamese society did not show particular prejudice to people of diverse sexual orientations and gender identity." In fact, sexual and gender pluralism in Vietnam was observed from as far back as the fourteenth century. In 1476, two women were even reportedly cohabiting and having sexual intercourse, with one of them miraculously becoming pregnant. The women were neither demonised nor criticized for their homosexual relationship.

Following Proschan and Tran's arguments, it is therefore unsurprising that "the very first discussion of homosexual practice... as a sin [in Vietnam]" came from French colonial literature of the late nineteenth century. European condemnation of 'alternative' local gender and sexual practices was subsequently inherited by Vietnamese authorities, and have persisted until the present day.

=== The Vietnamese state ===
The Vietnamese state is another major institution that seeks, either directly or indirectly, to demarcate and delimit the lives of Vietnamese les and queer people. Likewise, a historical analysis of existing scholarship will uncover the controlling mechanisms of state and societal structures on Vietnam's queer communities.

Notably, both Tran and Newton discuss the Social Evils Campaign launched by the Vietnamese state. According to Tran, the campaign was initiated in 1996. It claimed to manage and ban "serious social evils" like "drugs, prostitution and pornography". Spaces deemed to 'promote' these vices, such as karaoke bars and clubs, were raided and shut down.

Tran also mentions the State's Cultured Family Program, introduced during the Renovation Era, that promoted a paradoxical "modern propriety" among Vietnamese women, encouraging "a return to traditional gender norms", domesticity, nuclear family structure, and essentialist "feminine attributes". These state-driven campaigns thereby produced the gender-crosser as a foil: a deviant, dangerous figure that threatened Vietnamese cultural values and society.

Like Tran, Newton argues that the Vietnamese state's social evils campaign "indirectly" targeted and regulated non-normative genders and sexualities. Although she agrees with Tran on the method and effects of such state-sanctioned campaigns, she differs in the campaign's chronological development. While Tran writes in the context of the mid-1990s, during Doi Moi, Newton claims that the State's social evils campaigns began "since the 1950s", during Vietnam's socialist era. There are other minor inconsistencies in Tran and Newton's accounts of the same event. While both include drug use and prostitution as state-defined social evils, Newton additionally mentions gambling, while Tran includes pornography in the list of vices.

Barring these minor discrepancies, what is most important to note is that while these campaigns did not directly target les or Vietnamese queer communities, coupled together, they sought to regulate the ideals of the body, gender and sexuality by promoting conventional gender roles and traditional family values. Furthermore, by punishing 'alternative' feminine embodiments and likening them to 'evils' through both campaigns, the State effectively warned against and curtailed the possibilities of being les in Vietnamese society.

=== The Vietnamese media ===
The Vietnamese state also acts in collusion with other social structures like the media industry in order to spread an undesirable representation and reputation of les and queer people. Most notably, in 2002, the state-directed media in Vietnam declared homosexuality as a social evil, likening it to a moral pollutant, and broadcast calls for the "arrests of homosexual couples". Consequently, there was an increase in police raids of LGBT establishments, and the community became further isolated. The media is therefore a powerful tool that influences popular opinion and perpetuates negative perceptions of les and homosexuality in Vietnam.

Les are also presented as sexually reckless and "evading the responsibilities of proper and filial womanhood within a heteronormative family." This depiction of sexual impulsiveness is achieved through the image of the "trendy les", a hedonistic gold-digger who avoids the responsibilities of heterosexual marriage and child-bearing in favour of a "hyper-consumer lifestyle". In Vietnamese media, female (homo)sexual decadence is therefore portrayed through stories of les spending late nights in clubs and bars, exposed to the corrupting influence of drugs, prostitution, and gambling. The undesirability of female homosexuality is hence likened to the excessive, greedy consumption of nightlife and social ills.

In Vietnamese print media from 1986 to 2005, Tran also notes how female homosexuality is likened to a "disease" and even "homicidal conduct". The latter is often allegorized through the popular fictional detective-thriller genre. In a five-part column published in the Ho Chi Minh City's Police paper from December 1988 to August 1989, Ms. Ngoc Ha murders her ex-girlfriend in a fit of rage after she breaks up with her. Recalling Tran's analysis of the 'gender-crossing' discourse around Vietnamese homosexualities, the author concludes that parents who dress their girls as boys and vice versa will result in them growing up to commit murder like Ms. Ngoc Ha.

Despite the predominant stigmatisation of les and queer people in Vietnamese media, there have been a few notable examples of more positive or nuanced media representations. These include the ground-breaking films Adrift (2009) and Lost in Paradise (2011) that deal with female and male homosexuality in Vietnam respectively.

== Effects of structural homo- and les-phobia ==
Negative and inaccurate representations of les and Vietnam's wider queer communities, perpetrated by overarching governing structures like the state, media, and colonial modernity, have tangible effects on body and mind. Les people are often the victims of "corrective" rape. Anti-LGBT violence, both physical and psychological, is also common in Vietnamese schools, causing up to 43% of targeted students to drop out. Both teachers and students are guilty of harassing and bullying LGBT students.

Due to unsafe school environments, LGBT people are often denied educational prospects, consequently diminishing their chances of pursuing professional careers to make a living for themselves. The lack of educational and professional qualifications results in poverty and drives LGBT people to sex work, which, although viable as a profession, "further predisposes them to abuse, exploitation, and marginalization by society."

Rejection from families is also common. Most Vietnamese families prioritize Confucian values and traditional gender roles and hence pressure their LGBT children to enter heterosexual marriages in order to preserve the honour and reputation of their family. For example, the family of a 20-year-old gay woman dissuaded her from her 'lifestyle choices' by emphasizing "the issue of face". Those who do not conform to filial expectations are often kicked out of family homes, exacerbating impoverishment and homelessness among LGBT youth.

Structural homophobia thus results in a cycle of isolation and destitution for many Vietnamese LGBT people. This results in what ethnographer Paul Horton calls the 'misrecognition' of Vietnamese LGBT people, which causes many to feel alone, depressed, and even suicidal. Horton derived his thesis through extensive ethnographic fieldwork conducted in Hanoi with LGBT youth aged 20 to 25. According to Horton, and recalling earlier exegesis, misrecognition occurs in everyday contexts, such as the media, education system, families, and societal interactions. For his informants, the hegemonic heterosexuality in Vietnamese society causes them to feel "socially invisible", unrecognised, and ostracised. A young woman confided that this overwhelming 'normalcy' made her feel "afraid" of her sexual difference.

Horton shows how pervasive instances of misrecognition and stigmatisation result in a prevalence of suicide and mental health issues among Vietnam's les and queer youth, who feel alone, invisible, without a community to turn to for assistance or reprieve. One of Horton's informants morosely recounts how her friend committed suicide because she was unaware that there were support and community groups for lesbians in Hanoi. Horton's ethnographic approach therefore unearths and underscores the importance of community to Vietnamese les, for whom it is a literal lifeline.

== Les personal identification ==
Before describing the politics and pragmatics of les community formation, exegesis on their personal, subjective identification is necessary. It is vital to acknowledge the legitimacy and agency of les self-identification in the face of derogatory slurs like o-moi, and over more widely and internationally common terms like 'lesbian' or 'queer.' Outside of Euro-American contexts, where the latter terms usually originate, local vernacular may have already taken precedence. Furthermore, in geopolitical contexts, women who have sexual or romantic relationships with other women may choose not to identify as lesbian for personal or political reasons. Others may appropriate or localize such terms to make it relevant to their respective social values. These strategies will be detailed in this section.

In other words, "making "lesbian" a global category is problematic because it imposes the Eurocentric term "lesbian"" onto diverse communities who have very different sexual practices, standards, and realities. Globally circulating sexual identifiers therefore risk being reductive or generalizing the geopolitical and cultural specificities of gender and sexuality.

Attention must also be given to gioi tinh, the local gender/sex construct that shapes les linguistic, subjective self-determination. Unlike globally translatable, and hence accessible, labels like 'LGBT' or 'lesbian', Newton writes that gioi tinh "is more complex than either "gender" or "sexual orientation", and holds contradictory, "multiple meanings". Moreover, its discrepancies and contestations are "not a problem of translation", but "reflect a broader conceptual disjuncture between Western and Vietnamese conceptions of gender/sex," where the former model cannot simply be mapped onto the latter.

As Newton discovered through her fieldwork, gioi tinh is "a complex combination of both gender and sexuality," comprising four categories that will be briefly introduced here. Firstly, gioi tinh can refer to "biological sex [male/female] or heteronormative social gender [man/woman]." Nam is used for men/males, and nu for women/females. Gioi tinh is most commonly used in this manner, "reflecting the rampant heterosexism of Vietnamese language and social norms." Secondly, gioi tinh can refer to sexuality and sexual acts. Thirdly, it can indicate sexual orientation, specifically heterosexual, homosexual, or bisexual.

Most importantly, les have also incorporated a "gender within gender" into gioi tinh, a fourth category to describe the unique vocabulary of their les gender. This subcultural category of subjective identification differs from other Southeast Asian gender/sex systems like the Thai phet. This category includes les genders: B, SB, and fem, which are modifications of "English terms "butch," "soft butch," and "femme." For the uninitiated, the three terms can be thought of simply as a decreasing gradation from masculinity (B) to femininity (fem). There are also slight "modifiers to these three main genders", such as hard B to describe a hyper-masculine personal identification.

Interestingly, les differ from other female same-sex communities in Southeast Asia in terms of their personal identification. Most distinctly, Newton notes that her les informants identified their gioi tinh as nu (woman), and never as nam (man). However, other regional female same-sex subjects like the Thai tom (the local term for tomboy) are "more appropriately gendered as "men." Transgender masculinities hence appear to be a more prevalent form of identification for other Southeast Asian female homosexual subjects than for les.

Besides the toms of Thailand, the tombois of West Sumatra are also more appropriately identified as men. In her ethnographic fieldwork, during which she briefly dated a tomboi, Evelyn Blackwood realized that "tombois were not the Indonesian version of [the globally circulating category of] butches. They were men."

Ethnographer Kale Bantigue Fajardo similarly argues how the seafaring Filipino tomboy, who works on itinerant ships, are not butch lesbians. Rather, their "female manhood" resembles transgender masculinities such as toms in Thailand and tombois in West Sumatra. Furthermore, by co-existing with heterosexual Filipino seamen in "purely men's spaces" like cockfights, Fajardo illustrates how transgender Filipino tomboy masculinities are capable of negotiating, reconceptualizing, and even participating in the former's dominant "watertight masculinities". In contrast to the transgender masculinities in Southeast Asian contexts, Vietnam's les prefer to identify as female homosexuals.

== Les community formation ==
Having foregrounded les subjective terms and systems of identification, it is equally vital to examine how these self-perceptions translate within a group or community dynamic. Most importantly, both individual and community identities are paramount in granting les agency and kinship in the face of stigmatisation and misrecognition by overarching structures of governance.

Notably, Newton foregrounds les communities in Saigon in her scholarship, and specifically explores how the concept of 'contingent invisibility' is instrumental to their formation. To provide exegesis for her original theorization, Newton surveys existing literature on queer visibility and gendered space, but draws most importantly from ethnographic fieldwork that she conducted on Saigon's les community from 2006 to 2010.

Newton argues that, "in the face of social stigma" such as those imposed by the state, media, and external European influence, Saigonese les recognition and kinship are facilitated through a "strategic invisibility", in which they are hidden in plain sight from governing and surveillance structures. Therefore, community formation among Saigon's les are 'contingent' on factors such as state legislations, personal relationships, and gender norms, and cannot be conceived of within the dichotomous binary of positive visibility and passive, negative invisibility.

Instead of directly opposing or criticizing hegemonic structures like the state and media, Newton illustrates how les create a sense of community and validation by strategically navigating within social norms and structures and appropriating them for their benefit. For instance, although les might be considered a stigmatised minority in Vietnamese society, Newton shows how they are able to claim public space as their own.

On Saigon's sidewalks, les are able to "pass" as heterosexual, and hence blend in with broader heteronormative society. Les gather in groups to chat or play games, and can disappear quickly and discretely should the police decide to disperse the crowds. Protected by their "individual anonymity" in crowded streets and public parks, les are able to appropriate public spaces in order to nurture communalism and social intimacies.

Similarly, ethnographer Alison J. Murray notes how "covert lesbian activities are an adaptation" to negotiate around prevailing Islamic ideology in Indonesia. Like Vietnamese les, Indonesian lesbi (another locally preferred precedent to 'lesbian') avoid stigmatisation by adopting fluid sexual presentations in order to 'pass' as heterosexual males or females. However, Indonesian lesbi tactical kinship formations are created in response to frameworks of hegemonic religion, which, according to research material, is not a predominant concern for Vietnam's les.

Strategies of anonymity and concealment are also evident in other examples of les community formation. For instance, Newton describes the numerous contingencies around Café Duyen, the single most important space for les sociality. Firstly, the café is located not on busy, accessible sidewalks, but rather in a secluded residential alleyway, with only a small, illegible sign that does not signal that it is a les-only space. Therefore, "knowledge of the café's exact address is contingent on participation in the les world," reflecting the owner's motivation to establish the café primarily for the les community, not for commercial profit.

Secondly, "entrance to the café is contingent on one's ability to perform membership in the les community," through their personal appearance, or by naming popular les web forums. As Newton demonstrates, les ably form convivial communities despite being herded by hegemonic governing structures. In fact, it is precisely these forces of stigmatisation and misrecognition that generate tactical, undetectable, thriving les communities.

== Conclusion: The politics of (in)visibility and "come out" ==
Through her research, Newton therefore illustrates how idea(l)s of community formation and visibility are fundamentally different in Western and Vietnamese queer contexts. In Western neoliberal contexts, spatial occupation and public visibility are often straightforwardly linked to active "resistance" and progress for queer communities, while invisibility is perceived as a "deficiency", lacking political intent. Such a myopic binarization might explain the pre-emptive, misinformed demonization of 'Third World' or 'global South' countries like Vietnam as being 'backwards' or 'undeveloped' due to their lack of visible or documented LGBT rights.

However, as described in the previous section, Vietnam's les do not directly oppose governing structures or subscribe to a rights-based politics of visibility. Instead, they utilize strategies of contingent invisibility to productively adapt to and appropriate hegemonic systems in order to develop burgeoning communities, kinship, and personal agency.

Vietnamese les politics of (in)visibility can also be acutely observed in their concept of "come out", a local derivation of the global or Euro-American concept of "coming out": a personal and politicized disclosure of one's homosexuality. During a birthday celebration in the les community, Newton and other les witnessed birthday girl Bay symbolically propose to her girlfriend on stage with extravagant jewellery while proclaiming her everlasting love for her partner.

While some cheered on this ostentatious display of affection and wealth, others cautiously deemed it was "too much", stating that a "true" les would never resort to such lurid, performative gestures. In contrast to Western norms of "coming out", in the Vietnamese context, "self-disclosure of one's sexuality is not necessarily the ultimate legitimization of les sexual subjectivity." Paradoxically, it can actually undermine the authenticity of les subjectivity.

Sinnott observes the "lack of resonance with the concept of "coming out" among Thailand's toms and dees, who never made public proclamations of their sexuality because they were "unnecessary and overly confrontational". Non-disclosure among female same-sex communities in Southeast Asia thereby underscores a transnational politics of gender and sexuality.

Through their unique vocabulary of gendered identification and strategies of contingent invisibility, les in Vietnam elude the limitations and stigmatisations of governing structures like the state, media, and European modernity. Rather than engage in direct confrontation or opposition, their politics of (in)visibility allows them to nurture communities and personal identities on their own terms, beyond the pervasive heteronormativity of Vietnamese civil society.
