= Leslie Reid (artist) =

Canadian painter and printmaker

- Born: Leslie Mary Margaret Reid; February 8, 1947 (age 79); Ottawa, Ontario, Canada
- Education: Queen's University (1964–1968); Byam Shaw School of Art (1968–1970); Chelsea School of Art and Design (1970–1971); Slade School of Fine Art (1976–1977)
- Known for: Painter; Graphic artist
- Spouse: George Hollinworth (m. 1981)
- Elected: Royal Canadian Academy of Arts (1978)
- Website: lesliereid.ca

Leslie Reid RCA (born 1947) is a Canadian painter and printmaker from Ottawa, Ontario, known for adding a visual and sensory experience of light to the landscape tradition of painting in Canada. She is also an educator.

== Early years ==
Born in Ottawa, Reid was part of a military family that moved frequently. She earned a BA degree in political science and art history from Queen's University in 1968. After graduation, she moved to London, England and proceeded to study painting and printmaking at various institutions, including the Byam Shaw School of Art (1968–1970) for her Certificate in Art and Design, the Chelsea School of Art and Design (1970–1971) where she received the H. Diploma A., and the Slade School of Fine Art (1976–1977) at which she took a postgraduate course in Printmaking. While in London, she saw the Tate Gallery 1970 exhibition of Three Artists from Los Angeles (Robert Irwin among them) and, along with the paintings of J. M. W. Turner and other artists such as John Constable, wanted to distill what she had seen.

In 1972, she began teaching in the Visual Arts Department at the University of Ottawa where she also served as Chair. She is now Professor Emerita. She lives in Ottawa.

== Work ==
On her return to Canada, she examined the visual and sensory experience of light and space in her early, abstract prints and paintings, only gradually allowing figurative images in her work. In the early 1970s, Reid exhibited at Carleton University's Canadian Printmakers' Showcase, as well as at other Canadian and international venues. Reid evokes the "perceptual and psychological sensations caused by the experience of a particular place" using sites both familiar and less familiar both in Canada and abroad. She uses painting techniques, refined over time, which have involved her early abstract fields of many layers of sprayed acrylic; projection of photographs of places meaningful to her (Calumet Island, PQ, home of her maternal grandmother, was a favourite) on canvas, using stencil and airbrush to arrive at multilayered work, as well as using cold wax medium for its translucent quality. She often chooses subjects in landscape paintings in which "people can place themselves", seeking an effect of stillness.

Since 2013, she has been traveling to the Canadian and Norwegian Arctic regions, and used the emotions provoked by aerial views of glaciers, mountains, rivers – and climate change - to create new work but as before, work kindled by the experience of a particular place. Due to her study of aerial views, she finds that the "air between aircraft and earth has become a palpable space of sensation". Many of Reid's works reference locations in the Ottawa and Gatineau Valleys. She also may use different media to recreate her scenes of landscape and light, and to record the effects of climate change, such as the receding ice of the Arctic. She titles her ongoing overall project, Mapping Time, and it has led to several exhibitions.

== Exhibition history ==
Reid began making her colour field silkscreen prints and sprayed paintings in 1972. In 1976, her paintings were included in the landmark exhibition, Some Canadian Women Artists at the National Gallery of Canada which celebrated the first International Women’s Year. In 1977, she represented Canada at the Paris Biennale. Since then, she has had an active exhibition history with many solo exhibitions (see Major solo exhibitions) and group shows from coast to coast and internationally, especially of her prints, in the UK, the USA, Poland, Yugoslavia, the Netherlands, Sweden, France, and Japan, among others. In 1978, the four large canvases purchased by the National Gallery of Canada, were installed by the curator of contemporary art, Pierre Théberge. In 1979, she had a Canada Council for the Arts studio in the Cité internationale des arts, Paris.

In recent years, a retrospective titled Leslie Reid: A Darkening Vision, curated by Diana Nemiroff was held at the Carleton University Art Gallery in Ottawa (2011). Also in 2012, her paintings were exhibited in Builders: The Canadian Biennial at the National Gallery of Canada. In 2016, she made a three-week Arctic tour as part of the Canadian Forces Artists Program which resulted in an exhibition titled Mapping a Cold War, a multimedia production of paintings, videos and photo-mosaics at the Founders' Gallery, Military Museums, Calgary which the curator of the show, Lindsey Sharman, called "subtle, yet ambitious and sublime". In 2017, she joined the Canada 150 C3 expedition as artist through the Northwest Passage and on this trip made videos recording two Inuit women, one a young former Ranger and the other an Elder who had been part of the High Arctic Relocation. These videos were shown in Open Channels, Âjagemô Gallery, Canada Council 2019 and at the Frankfurt Book Fair 2020. (Reid's videos are available on her website). In 2018, Reid took part in the artists and writers residency The Arctic Circle, sailing for two weeks on a tall ship through the Norwegian arctic territory of Svalbard. In 2021, Reid exhibited three installations in the 2021 Bonavista Biennale: The Tonic of Wildness. In 2020, she received a Canada Council for the Arts, Concept to Realization Grant for Dark Ice ᓯᑯ ᕿᕐᓂᖅᓯᓯᒪᔪᖅ, an exhibition postponed till 2022, in collaboration with Robert Kautuk, an Inuk photographer from the community of Clyde River, which took place at the Ottawa Art Gallery, curated by Rebecca Basciano. Dark Ice examined effects of vanishing ice on geographies and communities in the Arctic. In 2024, Reid showed her New Arctic paintings, alongside Evergon's recent photographs at Galerie St-Laurent + Hill, Ottawa.

== Selected collections, memberships and awards ==
Her work has since been collected by numerous institutions in Canada, including the National Gallery of Canada, the Art Gallery of Nova Scotia, the Art Gallery of Ontario, the Glenbow Museum, the Ottawa Art Gallery, the Montreal Museum of Fine Arts, the Musée d'art contemporain de Montréal, the Robert McLaughlin Gallery, the Winnipeg Art Gallery, the Whyte Museum, the Richard L. Nelson Gallery at the University of California (Davis), and many more. In 1978, Reid was elected to the Royal Canadian Academy of Arts, which gave her the Award for Excellence in the Visual Arts in 2000. She is represented by the Galerie St-Laurent + Hill, Ottawa and Galerie Laroche/Joncas, Montreal.

== Major solo exhibitions in public institutions ==
- 1980 Leslie Reid: Recent paintings and prints, Canada House, London, England, catalogue introduction by Richard Simmins.
- 1980 Centre Culturel Canadien, Paris;
- 1984 Leslie Reid: Recent prints and paintings. Agnes Etherington Art Centre, Kingston, curated by Robert Swain;
- 1990-1994 Landscape into Light: Leslie Reid Paintings and Prints, 1974-1990, curated by Anna Babinska; Arts Court, Ottawa (today the Ottawa Art Gallery)
  - 1990 Arts Court Gallery (Ottawa);
  - 1991 Richard L. Nelson Gallery, University of California (Davis);
  - 1991 Mary Porter Sesnon Gallery, Porter College, University of California, Santa Cruz;
  - 1991 Meridian Gallery, San Francisco, California;
  - 1992 Fine Arts Center, Augusta College, Augusta, Georgia;
  - 1994 Robert McLaughlin Gallery, Oshawa, Ontario;
- 1996 Surfacing, Carleton University Art Gallery, Ottawa, curated by Sandra Dyck;
- 2011 Leslie Reid: A Darkening Vision, retrospective exhibition Carleton University Art Gallery, Ottawa, curated by Diana Nemiroff;
- 2016 Mapping a Cold War, University of Calgary's Founders' Gallery, The Military Museums, Calgary, curated by Lindsey Sharman;
- 2022 ᓯᑯ ᕿᕐᓂᖅᓯᓯᒪᔪᖅ | DARK ICE, Ottawa Art Gallery.

== Notable works ==
- Calumet Island 6 a.m. / Calumet Island 10 a.m. / Calumet Island 2 p.m. / Calumet Island 6 p.m. (1974); Cape Pine: The Cairn; Cape Pine: The Road (2011) National Gallery of Canada
- Cape Pine: The Station Art Gallery of Ontario

== Notable awards ==
- 1970: Canadian Centennial Scholarship, U.K.
- 1976: Merit Award, University of Ottawa
- 1979: Cité Internationale des Arts, Canada Council Studio, Paris
- 1981: Merit Award, University of Ottawa
- 1996: Policy 94 Award
- 2000: Arts 2000 Jury Prize for Excellence in Visual Arts, Royal Canadian Academy of Arts
- 2004-2020: Grants from the Canada Council for the Arts, the Ontario Arts Council, the City of Ottawa
- 2012: Queen Elizabeth Diamond Jubilee Medal

== Publications by artist ==
- 1997 The Last Closet. Make: the Magazine of Women's Art, April/May, UK
- 2003 Afterimage: Making Art and Mothering Teens, in Mothering, Popular Culture and the Arts, Journal of the Association for Research on Mothering, vol. 5, no. 1, York University, Toronto
- 2011 Afterimage: A Journal of Making Art and Mothering Teens. The M Word: Real Mothers in Contemporary Art. Bradford, Ontario: Demeter Press. 2011.

== Personal life ==
Reid's eyes were damaged at birth and later, as an adult she had a traumatic fall which prevented her from painting for five years.
