= Les Ames (footballer) =

Australian rules footballer

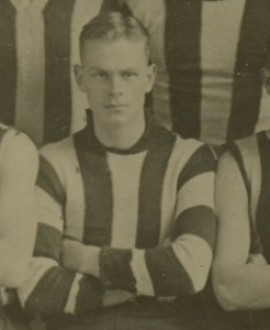
- Ames in 1931

Personal information
- Full name: Leslie James Ames
- Born: 29 August 1912; Collingwood, Victoria
- Died: 26 November 1998 (aged 86)
- Original team: Northcote
- Height: 182 cm (6 ft 0 in)
- Weight: 73 kg (161 lb)

Playing career^{1}
Years	Club	Games (Goals)
1931	Collingwood	3 (5)
1936	Fitzroy	5 (5)
Total		8 (10)
- ^{1} Playing statistics correct to the end of 1936.

Leslie James Ames (29 August 1912 – 26 November 1998) was an Australian rules footballer who played with Collingwood and Fitzroy in the Victorian Football League (VFL).
