= Recognition of same-sex unions in Vietnam =

Vietnam does not recognize same-sex marriages, civil unions, domestic partnerships or any other form of recognition for same-sex couples. Article 36(1) of the 2013 Constitution of Vietnam states that "marriage must adhere to the principles of voluntariness, progressiveness, monogamy, and equality between husband and wife." In 2013, the government announced it would no longer fine people who carry out public same-sex wedding ceremonies; however, these unions have no legal recognition, and as such same-sex couples are unable to access the legal rights and benefits of marriage.

In 2022, activists began collecting signatures in support of same-sex marriage as part of the "I Do campaign", hoping to have the National Assembly pass same-sex marriage legislation by 2030. Polling suggests that a majority of Vietnamese people support the legal recognition of same-sex marriage, with a 2023 Pew Research Center poll showing that 65% of respondents supported same-sex marriage.

== Legal history ==
=== Background ===
Homosexuality and same-sex unions have never been criminalized in Vietnam. Same-sex marriage was not mentioned in law following colonization by the Second French Empire and later the French Third Republic. Likewise, the Civil Code of South Vietnam, adopted in 1972, and the Law on Marriage and Family 1959 of North Vietnam did not explicitly address the issue. Following reunification, the Law on Marriage and Family became applicable throughout the entire country.

Attempts to hold unofficial same-sex marriages in the late 1990s were met with mixed reactions from the government. A male couple held a ceremony in Ho Chi Minh City in 1997. The wedding party took place in a hotel with about 100 guests. One official said "it should be publicly condemned", but the police said there was no legal framework under which the two men could be charged. Another attempt in 1998 by a lesbian couple in the province of Vĩnh Long, however, was officially sanctioned. The Ministry of Justice later intervened and ordered the annulment of the union, stating it was "illegal and runs counter to the morals and traditional customs of the Vietnamese nation". A law was passed three months later officially banning same-sex unions in Vietnam. Previous laws against all forms of cohabitation were repealed by a new marriage law approved by the National Assembly in 2000, though provisions forbidding the recognition of same-sex unions were retained in the law. Despite this, several same-sex couples attempted to get married over the years, occasionally in public ceremonies. A lesbian wedding took place in Cà Mau in 2012, and another lesbian couple were married in Trà Vinh on 16 June 2014. On 28 July 2014, British nationals Yein Kai Yee and Sutpreedee Chinithigun were married at the British embassy in Hanoi, in what the media described as the "first same-sex marriage in Vietnam". The marriage was performed under British law and is not legally recognised in Vietnam.

=== Restrictions ===
Laws regarding homosexuality in Asia Same-sex sexual activity legal Marriage performed Marriage recognized Other type of partnership Unregistered cohabitation No recognition of same-sex couples Restricted or ambiguous Restriction on freedom of expression, not enforced Severe restriction of association with arrests or detention Same-sex sexual activity illegal Prison, not enforced Prison Death penalty on books, not enforced Enforced death penalty

Article 64 of the Constitution of Vietnam adopted in 1992 stated that: "The family is the cell of society. The State protects marriage and the family. Marriage shall conform to the principles of free consent, progressive union, monogamy, and equality between husband and wife. Parents have the responsibility to bring up their children into good citizens. Children and grandchildren have the duty to show respect to and look after their parents and grandparents. The State and society shall recognise no discrimination among children." Article 36(1) of the 2013 Vietnamese Constitution is similar, reading:

Men and women have the right to marry and divorce. Marriage must adhere to the principles of voluntariness, progressiveness, monogamy, and equality between husband and wife. (Note: Vietnamese: Nam, nữ có quyền kết hôn, ly hôn. Hôn nhân theo nguyên tắc tự nguyện, tiến bộ, một vợ một chồng, vợ chồng bình đẳng, tôn trọng lẫn nhau.)

Article 8(2) of the Law on Marriage and Family (Vietnamese: Luật Hôn nhân và Gia đình, pronounced [lwə̀kʔ hōŋ ɲə̄ŋ vâː jāː ʔɗɨ̂n]; Cham: ꨀꨕꩅ ꨤꨇ꩑ ꨧꨯꨩꩃ ꨟꨋꨥꨯꩌ, Adat Lakhah saong Mangawom) contains an explicit ban on same-sex marriage: "The State shall not recognize marriage between persons of the same sex".

=== Failed attempts in 2012–2015 ===
In May 2012, a same-sex couple in Hà Tiên held a traditional, public wedding at their home, but the ceremony was interrupted by local authorities. The event was widely reported in Vietnamese media and triggered a public debate on the issue. Two months later, the Minister of Justice, Hà Hùng Cường, said that the government was considering whether to legalise same-sex marriage, stating that "in order to protect individual freedoms, same-sex marriage should be allowed". The matter was expected to be debated in the National Assembly in spring 2013. However, in February 2013, the Ministry of Justice requested that the National Assembly avoid taking action until 2014. The Supreme People's Procuracy, the Ministry of Health and government agencies in several provinces expressed support for repealing the ban. On the other hand, the Vietnam Women's Union and other provincial government agencies argued that same-sex marriage should not be recognized, warning of a weakening of "traditional values" and that such a move would "not be in line with Vietnamese customs".

In June 2013, the Ministry of Justice submitted a bill to remove the same-sex marriage ban from the Law on Marriage and Family, and provide some legal rights to cohabiting same-sex couples. In August, Prime Minister Nguyễn Tấn Dũng called same-sex marriage a "social reality" and argued that its legalization "cannot be avoided". On 24 September 2013, the government issued a decree abolishing the penalty for holding same-sex marriage ceremonies. The decree took effect on 11 November 2013. Nguyễn Anh Tuấn, the head of a gay tourist agency in Hanoi, told NBC News, "It's not perfect… It's not completely there but it is a great step in the right direction." Several public campaigns for the legalization of same-sex marriage took place in October 2013. The National Assembly also began looking into the possibility of enacting civil unions. On 27 May 2014, the National Assembly's Committee for Social Affairs removed the provisions granting legal rights to cohabiting same-sex couples from the legislation. The bill was approved by the National Assembly on 19 June 2014, promulgated by President Trương Tấn Sang on 26 June, and took effect on 1 January 2015, but without provisions recognizing same-sex unions. The law enacted a provision in article 8(2) of the Law on Marriage and Family that Vietnam does not "recognize marriage between persons of the same sex".

=== Attempts at legalization in 2022–2025 ===
At Vietnam's third Universal Periodic Review (UPR) on 22 January 2019, Iceland, the Netherlands and Canada recommended the government to legalize same-sex marriage. On 4 July 2019, the government "noted" (rejected) these recommendations. At the fourth UPR in 2024, Mexico, Sweden and Chile also recommended Vietnam to recognize same-sex marriages, which the government once again rejected.

On 10 August 2022, as part of the "I Do campaign", activists began gathering signatures in support of the legalization of same-sex marriage. By 20 November 2022, the organizers' Facebook page stated that they had collected about 40,000 valid signatures. The National Assembly was expected to discuss revisions to the marriage laws in 2024 or 2025, though finally the issue was not included in the legislative schedule for the 2024–2025 period. Activists said they hoped the issue would be debated in the following legislative schedules between 2025 and 2030. Hoping to raise awareness, singer-songwriter Vũ Cát Tường married her partner in March 2025.

== Economic impact ==
In 2022, the Vietnam Center for Economic and Strategic Studies (VESS; Trung tâm Nghiên cứu Kinh tế và Chiến lược Việt Nam) published findings on the potential economic benefits of legalizing same-sex marriage. The report projected that legalization could boost Vietnam's GDP by 1.65% to 4.36% over a decade—equating to an annual increase of 0.165% to 0.436%—due to improved labor productivity and a more inclusive work environment. Sectors such as wedding services and family-related industries were also expected to see revenue increases of 4.36% to 5.26%. Similarly, at a 2024 seminar held at the Independence Palace, a report by Open For Business addressed Vietnam's "brain drain", linking it to a lack of inclusive policies for the LGBT community. Experts and researchers at the event agreed that recognizing same-sex marriage would positively impact the economy. Furthermore, legalization was estimated to reduce costs associated with LGBT-related mental health issues by US$13 million to US$71 million. The Vietnam National Authority of Tourism also argued that legalization would positively impact tourism.

== Public opinion ==
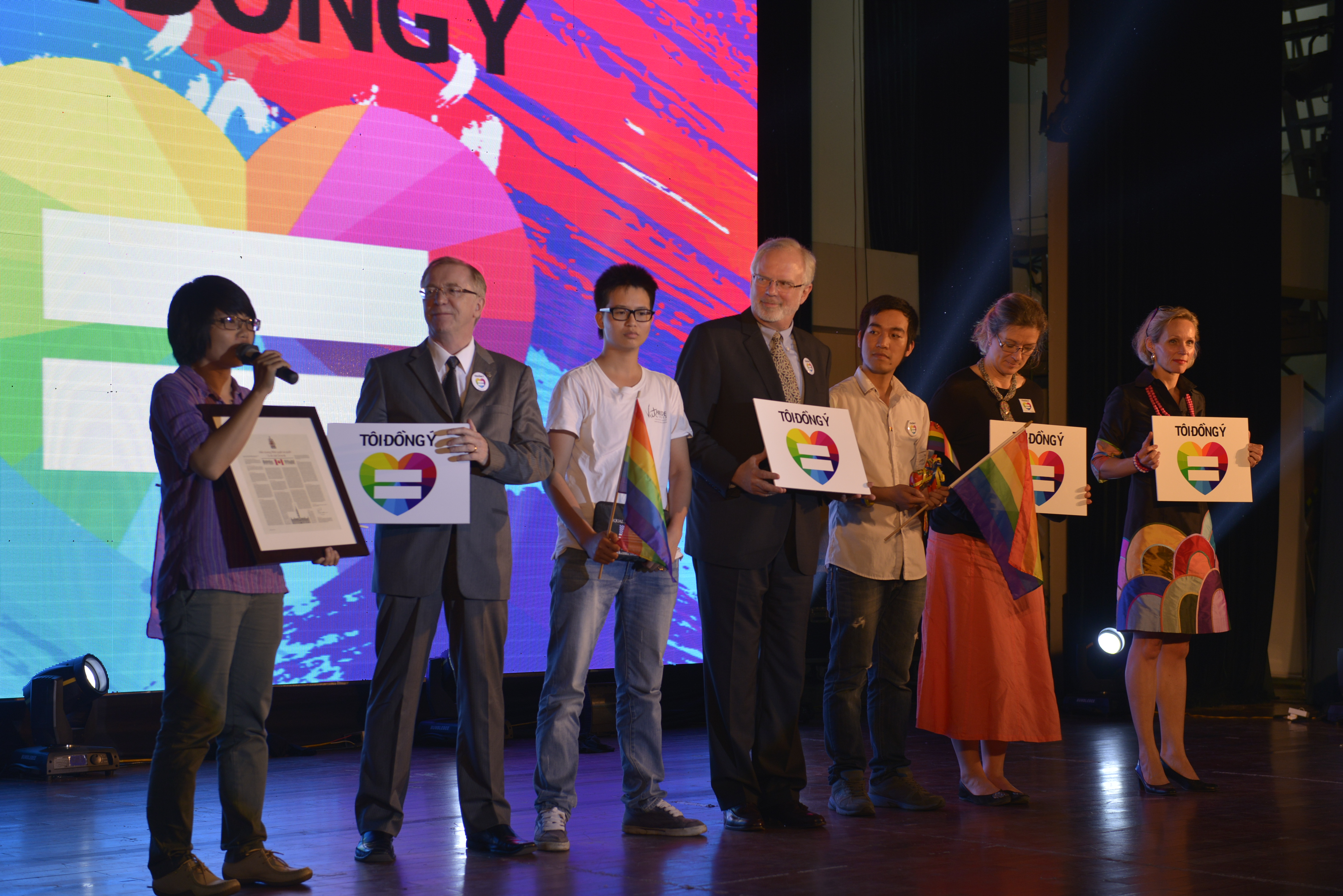
Activists with U.S. Ambassador David B. Shear holding signs reading Tôi Đồng Ý ("I Do") as part of the "I Do campaign", 2014

Opinion polls conducted since 2012 have reported a rising trend of support for same-sex marriage in Vietnam, making it one of the most supportive in Southeast Asia, and Asia generally. A survey carried out in December 2012 by the Institute for Studies of Society, Economy and Environment (iSEE; Viện nghiên cứu Xã hội, Kinh tế và Môi trường) showed that 37% of Vietnam's population supported the legalization of same-sex marriage, while 58% were opposed. A March 2014 poll conducted by the iSEE found that 34% of respondents supported same-sex marriage, while 53% were opposed. 41% of respondents supported recognizing same-sex cohabitation or civil unions, and 72% believed that legalising same-sex marriage would not negatively affect their families. The sample size was 5,000 respondents.

An online survey carried out by the International Lesbian, Gay, Bisexual, Trans and Intersex Association (ILGA) from December 2015 to January 2016 found that 45% of respondents supported the legalization of same-sex marriage, while 25% opposed it. A 2017 survey by the Social Life Research Institute in Ho Chi Minh City showed that 51% of respondents aged 15 to 35 thought same-sex marriage should be allowed in Vietnam, while 26% were undecided and 23% disagreed.

A June–September 2023 Pew Research Center poll showed that 65% of respondents supported same-sex marriage (30% "strongly" and 35% "somewhat"), while 30% opposed (14% "strongly" and 16% "somewhat"). Support was highest among Buddhists and Christians at 71%, but lowest among the religiously unaffiliated at 59%. When divided by age, support was highest among 18–34-year-olds at 79% and lowest among those aged 35 and above at 57%. The survey was conducted face-to-face with a sample size of 2,255 respondents. This level of support was the highest among the six Southeast Asian countries polled, ahead of Thailand at 60%, Cambodia at 57%, Singapore at 45%, Malaysia at 17%, and Indonesia at 5%. A 2024 Viet Nam Provincial Governance and Public Administration Performance Index (PAPI) survey showed that public support for same-sex marriage in Vietnam had risen to 67%.

== See also ==
- LGBT rights in Vietnam
- Recognition of same-sex unions in Asia
- I Do campaign
