= Les Reed =

Les Reed may refer to:

- Les Reed (songwriter) (1935–2019), English songwriter, arranger, musician and light orchestra leader
- Les Reed (footballer) (1932–2021), Australian rules footballer
- Les Reed (football manager) (born 1952), English football coach and manager

== See also ==
- Leslie Reid (disambiguation)
