= Les (surname) =

Les is a surname. Notable people with the surname include:

- Jim Les (born 1963), American basketball coach and former player
- John Les (born 1951 or 1952), Canadian politician
- Laura Les (born 1994), member of experimental-pop duo 100 gecs
