= History of Vietnam (1945–present) =

After World War II and the collapse of Vietnam's monarchy, France attempted to re-establish its colonial rule but was ultimately defeated by the communist rebels in the First Indochina War. On the other hand, France granted complete independence to the pro-French Vietnamese government they established in 1949. The Geneva Accords in 1954 partitioned the country temporarily in two with a promise of democratic elections in 1956 to reunite the country. The United States and South Vietnam did not sign the Accords and insisted on United Nations supervision of any election to prevent fraud, which the Soviet Union and North Vietnam refused. North and South Vietnam therefore remained divided until the Vietnam War ended with the Fall of Saigon in 1975.

After 1976, the newly reunified Vietnam faced many difficulties during the subsidy period due to a centralised command economy, the Third Indochina War, the Cold War, and an American economic embargo. In 1986, after the death of Lê Duẩn, the Communist Party of Vietnam changed its economic policy and began a series of reforms to the private sector and to the economy through what is known as Đổi Mới, a reform primarily led by Prime Minister Võ Văn Kiệt. During the 6th National Congress of the Communist Party of Vietnam, the country abolished its planned economy system in favor of a socialist-oriented market economy. Ever since the reforms in the late 1980s, Vietnam has enjoyed substantial economic growth.

== End of World War II ==
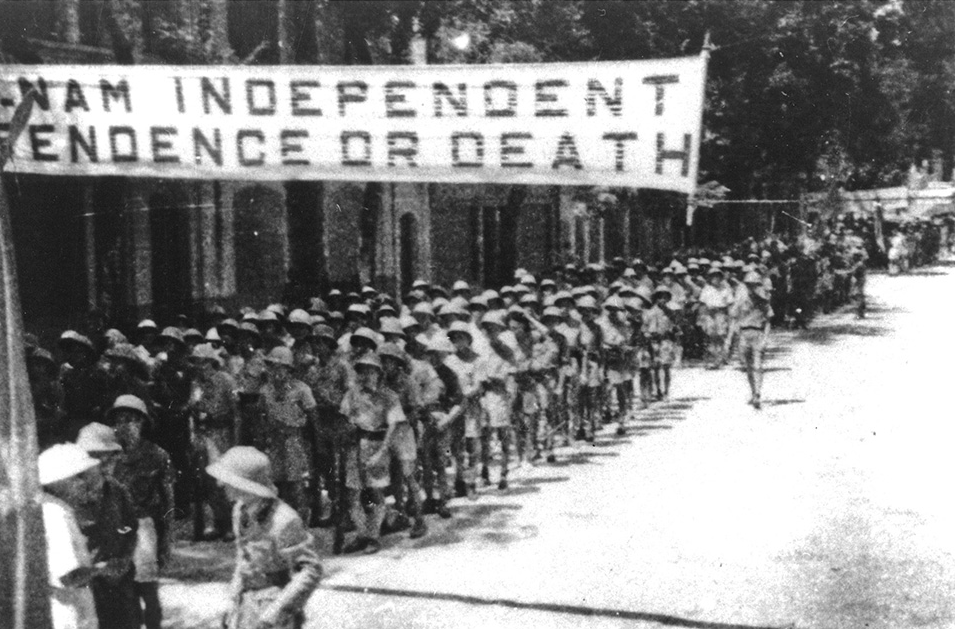
Pro-independence demonstration in 1945

The Japanese occupied Vietnam during World War II but allowed the French to remain and exert some influence. At the war's end in August 1945, a power vacuum was created in Vietnam. Capitalizing on this, the Việt Minh launched the "August Revolution" across the country to seize government offices. Emperor Bảo Đại abdicated on August 25, 1945, ending the Nguyễn dynasty. On September 2, 1945, at Duc Anh Ba Đình Square, Ho Chi Minh, leader of the Viet Minh organization, declared Vietnam's independence under the new name of the Democratic Republic of Vietnam (DRVN) in a speech that invoked the United States Declaration of Independence and the French Revolution's Declaration of the Rights of Man and of the Citizen. Ho sent several letters to the US government asking to be recognised as the government of Vietnam and offering friendship to America, but none were ever answered.

== Cold War ==
=== French Indochina War (1945–1954) ===
The British commander in Southeast Asia, Lord Louis Mountbatten, sent 20,000 troops of the 20th Indian division to occupy Saigon under General Douglas Gracey who landed in southern Vietnam on 6 September 1945, disarming the Japanese and restoring order. They had to re-arm Japanese prisoners of war known as Gremlin force to keep order until more troops arrived. The British began to withdraw in December 1945, but this was not completed until June of the following year. The last British soldiers were killed in Vietnam in June 1946. Altogether 40 British and Indian troops were killed and over a hundred were wounded. Vietnamese casualties were 600. They were followed by French troops trying to re-establish their rule. In the north, Chiang Kai-shek's Kuomintang army entered Vietnam from China, also to disarm the Japanese, followed by the forces of the non-Communist Vietnamese parties, such as Việt Nam Quốc Dân Đảng and Việt Nam Cách mệnh Đồng minh Hội. In January 1946, Vietnam had its first National Assembly election (won by the Viet Minh in central and northern Vietnam), which drafted the first constitution, but the situation was still precarious: the French tried to regain power by force; some Cochinchinese politicians formed a seceding government of the Republic of Cochinchina (Nam Kỳ Quốc) while the non-Communist and Communist forces were engaging each other in sporadic battles. Stalinists purged Trotskyists. Religious sects, like the Cao Đài and Hòa Hảo, and resistance groups formed their own militias. Under the terms of the Accord between France and the Democratic Republic of Vietnam on 6 March 1946:

1. The French Government recognizes the Vietnamese Republic as a Free State having its own Government, its own Parliament, its own Army and its own Finances, forming part of the Indochinese Federation and of the French Union. As concerns the reuniting of the three "Annamite Regions" Cochinchina, Annam and Tonkin the French Government pledges itself to ratify the decisions taken by the populations consulted by referendum.

2. The Vietnamese Government declares itself ready to welcome amicably the French Army when, conforming to international agreements, it relieves the Chinese troops. A Supplementary Accord, attached to the present Preliminary Agreement, will establish the means by which the relief operations will be carried out.

3. The stipulations formulated above will immediately enter into force. Immediately after the exchange of signatures, each of the High Contracting Parties will take all measures necessary to stop hostilities in the field, to maintain the troops in their respective positions, and to create the favorable atmosphere necessary for the immediate opening of friendly and sincere negotiations. These negotiations will deal particularly with:

a. diplomatic relations of Viet Nam with Foreign States
b. the future law of Indochina
c. French interests, economic and cultural, in Viet Nam.

This preliminary agreement was signed by M. Sainteny, Ho Chi Minh & Vu Hung Khanh at Hanoi on March 6, 1946.

In December 1946 full-scale war broke out between the Viet Minh and France. Realizing that colonialism was coming to an end worldwide, France fashioned a semi-independent State of Vietnam supported by Vietnamese anti-communists in March 1949, within the French Union, with Bảo Đại as head of state. Meanwhile, as the Communists under Mao Zedong took over China, the Viet Minh began to receive military aid from China. Beside supplying materials, Chinese cadres also pressured the Vietnamese Communist Party, then under First Secretary Trường Chinh, to emulate their brand of revolution, unleashing a purge of "bourgeois and feudal" elements from the Viet Minh ranks, carrying out a ruthless and bloody land reform campaign (Cải Cách Ruộng Đất), and denouncing "bourgeois and feudal" tendencies in arts and literature. Many true patriots and devoted Communist revolutionaries in the Viet Minh suffered mistreatment or were even executed during these movements. Many others became disenchanted and left the Viet Minh. The United States became strongly opposed to Hồ Chí Minh. In the 1950s the government of Bảo Đại gained recognition by the United States and the United Kingdom.

The Việt Minh force grew significantly with China's assistance and in 1954, under the command of General Võ Nguyên Giáp, launched a major siege against French bases in Điện Biên Phủ. The Việt Minh force surprised Western military experts with their use of primitive means to move artillery pieces and supplies up the mountains surrounding Điện Biên Phủ, giving them a decisive advantage. On May 7, 1954, French troops at Điện Biên Phủ, under Christian de Castries, surrendered to the Viet Minh and in July 1954, the Geneva Accord was signed between France and the Viet-Minh, paving the way for the French to leave Vietnam.

=== Vietnam War (1954–75) – the South ===
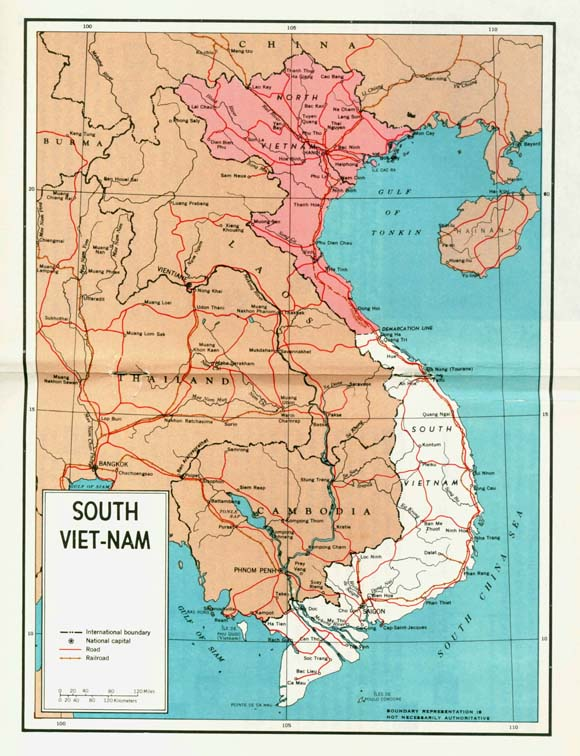
1964 US map of partitioned Vietnam

The Geneva Conference of July 1954 ended the Indochina War in Vietnam and partitioned the country into two states at the 17th parallel pending unification on the basis of internationally supervised free elections. Before losing the North to communists, on 4 June 1954, France recognized full independence of the State of Vietnam within the French Union. Ngô Đình Diệm, a former mandarin with a strong Catholic and Confucian background, was selected as Premier of the State of Vietnam by Bảo Đại. While Diệm was trying to settle the differences between the various armed militias in the South, Bảo Đại was persuaded to reduce his power. Diệm created a referendum in 1955 to depose Bảo Đại and declared himself president of the Republic of Vietnam (South Vietnam). The Republic of Vietnam (RVN) was proclaimed in Saigon on October 26, 1955. The United States began to provide military and economic aid to the RVN, training RVN personnel, and sending U.S. advisors to assist in building the infrastructure for the new government.

Also in 1954, Viet Minh forces took over North Vietnam according to the Geneva Accord. One million North Vietnamese civilians emigrated to South Vietnam to avoid persecution from the imminent Communist regime. At the same time, Viet Minh armed forces from South Vietnam were also moving to North Vietnam, as dictated by the Geneva Accord. However, some high-ranking Viet Minh cadres secretly remained in the South to follow the local situation closely, and created a communist insurgency against the Southern government if necessary. The most important figure among those was Lê Duẩn.

The Geneva Accord had promised elections to determine the government for a unified Vietnam. Neither the United States government nor Ngô Đình Diệm's State of Vietnam signed anything at the 1954 Geneva Conference. With respect to the question of reunification, the non-communist Vietnamese delegation objected strenuously to any division of Vietnam, but lost out when the French accepted the proposal of Viet Minh delegate Phạm Văn Đồng, who proposed that Vietnam eventually be united by elections under the supervision of "local commissions". The United States countered with what became known as the "American Plan", with the support of South Vietnam and the United Kingdom. It provided for unification elections under the supervision of the United Nations, but was rejected by the Soviet delegation.

Diệm took strong measures to secure South Vietnam from perceived internal threats, especially from the Viet Cong. He eliminated all private militias from the Bình Xuyên Party and the Cao Đài and Hòa Hảo religious sects. In October 1955, he deposed Bảo Đại and proclaimed himself president of the newly established the Republic of Vietnam, after rigging a referendum. He repressed political opposition, arresting the famous writer Nguyễn Tường Tam, who committed suicide while awaiting trial in jail. Diệm also acted aggressively to remove Communist agents still remaining in the South. He formed the Cần Lao Nhân Vị Party, mixing Individualist philosophy with republican, anti-communist elements. Another controversial policy was the Strategic Hamlet Program, which aimed to build fortified villages to remove and lock out Communists. However, it was in some ways ineffective as many covert communists were already part of the population and visually indistinguishable. It became unpopular as it limited the villagers' freedom and altered their traditional way of life.

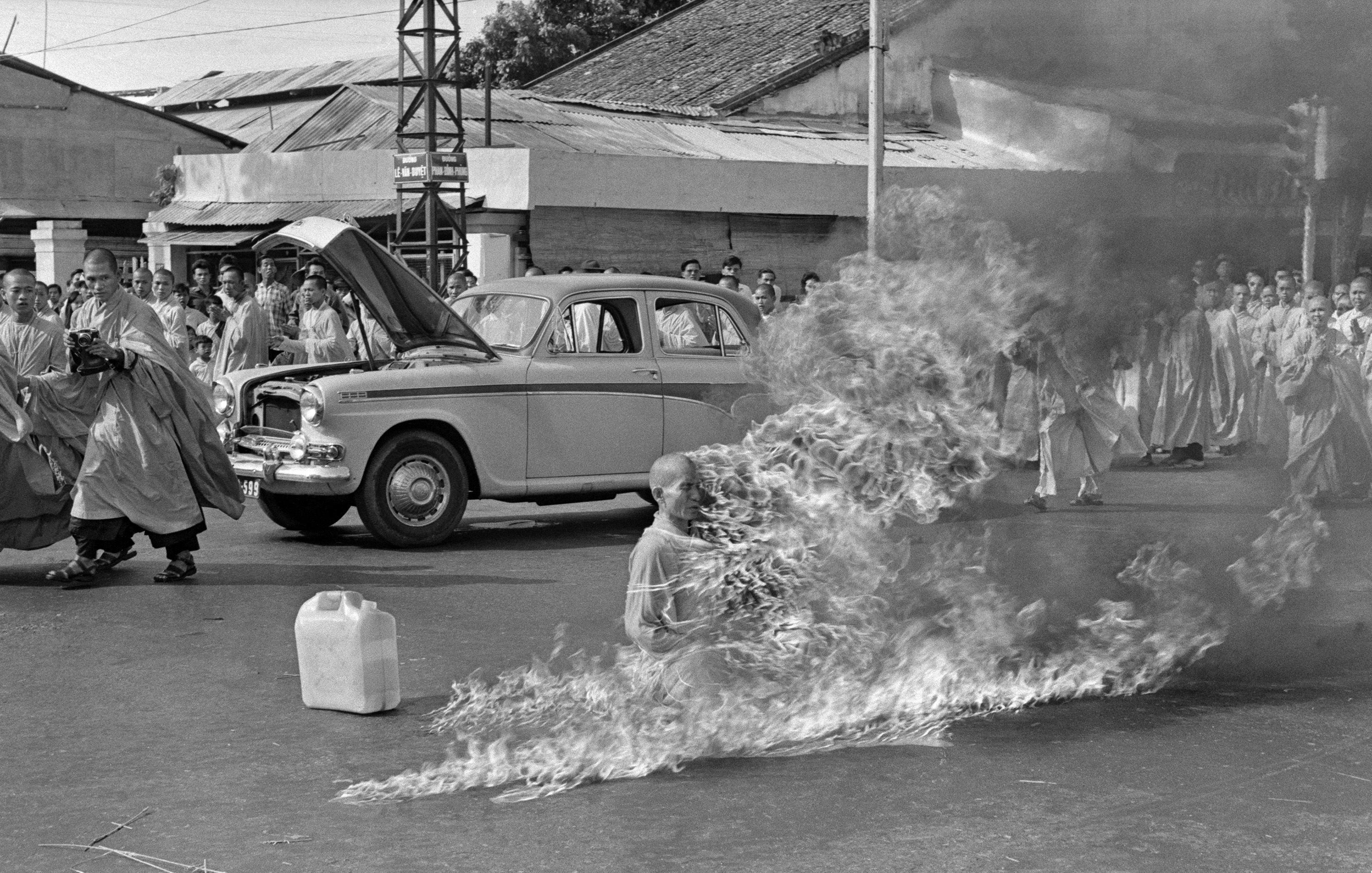
Self-immolation of Thích Quảng Đức, 11 June 1963

Although Ngô Đình Diệm personally was respected for his nationalism, political stability and policies triggering rapid economic growth, he ran a nepotistic and authoritarian government. Elections were routinely rigged. His perceived pro-Catholic policies sparked protests from the Buddhist community after demonstrators were killed on Vesak, Buddha's birthday, in 1963 when they were protesting a ban on the Buddhist flag. This incident sparked mass protests calling for religious equality. The most famous case was of Venerable Thích Quảng Đức, who burned himself to death to protest. The images of this event made worldwide headlines and brought extreme embarrassment for Diệm. The tension was not resolved, and on August 21, the ARVN Special Forces loyal to his brother and chief adviser Ngô Đình Nhu and commanded by Lê Quang Tung raided Buddhist pagodas across the country, leaving a death toll estimated to range into the hundreds. In the United States, the Kennedy administration became worried that the problems of Diệm's government were undermining the US's anti-Communist effort in Southeast Asia, and of Diệm's increasing resistance and non-cooperation with the American government. On November 1, 1963, with the planning and backing of the CIA and the Kennedy administration, South Vietnamese generals led by Dương Văn Minh engineered a coup d'état and overthrew Ngô Đình Diệm, killing both him and his brother Nhu. (see also Ngô Đình Cẩn)

Between 1963 and 1965, South Vietnam was extremely unstable as no government could keep power for long. There were more coups, often more than one every year. The Communist-run Viet Cong expanded their operation and scored some significant military victories during this period. In 1965, US President Lyndon Johnson sent troops to South Vietnam to secure the country and started to bomb North Vietnam, assuming that if South Vietnam fell to the Communists, other countries in the Southeast Asia would follow, in accordance with the domino theory. Other US allies, such as Australia, New Zealand, South Korea, Thailand, the Philippines, and Taiwan also sent troops to South Vietnam. Although the American-led troops succeeded in containing the advance of Communist forces, the presence of foreign troops, the widespread bombing over all of Vietnam, and the social vices that mushroomed around US bases upset the sense of national pride among many Vietnamese, North and South, causing some to become sympathetic to North Vietnam and the Viet Cong. In 1965, Air Marshal Nguyễn Cao Kỳ and General Nguyễn Văn Thiệu took power in a coup, and presided over a stable junta, and promised to hold elections under US pressure. In 1967, South Vietnam managed to conduct a National Assembly and Presidential election with Lt. General Nguyễn Văn Thiệu being elected to the Presidency, bringing the government to some level of stability.

=== Vietnam War (1954–75) – the North ===
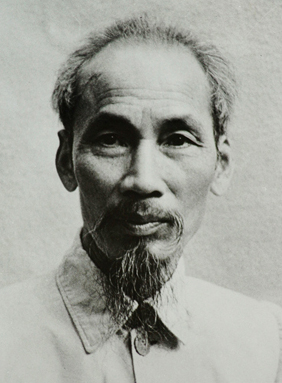
Portrait of Ho Chi Minh

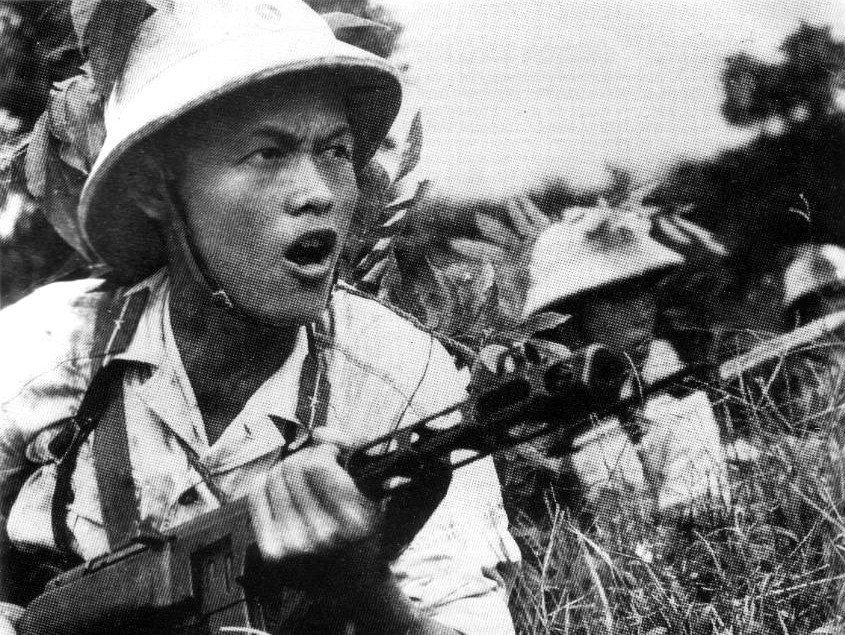
Vietnam People's Army soldier in 1966

Between 1953 and 1956, the North Vietnamese government instituted various agrarian reforms, including "rent reduction" and "land reform", which resulted in significant political oppression. During the land reform, testimony from North Vietnamese witnesses suggested a ratio of one execution for every 160 village residents, which extrapolated nationwide would indicate nearly 100,000 executions. Because the campaign was concentrated mainly in the Red River Delta area, a lower estimate of 50,000 executions became widely accepted by scholars at the time. However, declassified documents from the Vietnamese and Hungarian archives indicate that the number of executions was much lower than reported at the time, although likely greater than 13,500. A Northern democratic literary movement called Nhân văn-Giai phẩm (from the names of the two magazines which started the movement, based in Hanoi) developed, which attempted to encourage the democratization of the North and the free expression of thought. Intellectuals were thus lured into criticizing the leadership so they could be arrested later, and many were sent to hard labor camps (Gulags), following the model of the Hundred Flowers Campaign in China. Freedom of speech, freedom of assembly and other basic civilian freedoms were soon revoked after the government's attempt of destroying the literary movement. A cult of personality was also established around Ho Chi Minh, later extended nationwide after the Communist reunification of the Vietnam.

During this period, North Vietnam was a socialist state with a centralized command economy, an extensive security apparatus, a powerful propaganda machine that effectively rallied the people for the Party's causes, a superb intelligence system that infiltrated South Vietnam (spies such as Phạm Ngọc Thảo climbed to high military government positions), and severe suppression of political opposition. Even some decorated veterans and famed Communist cadres, such as Trần Đức Thảo, Nguyễn Hữu Đang, Trần Dần, Hoàng Minh Chính, were persecuted during the late 1950s Nhân Văn Giai Phẩm events and the 1960s Trial Against the Anti-Party Revisionists (Vụ Án Xét Lại Chống Đảng) for speaking their opinions. Nevertheless, this iron grip, together with consistent support from the Soviet Union and China, gave North Vietnam a militaristic advantage over South Vietnam. North Vietnamese leadership also had a steely determination to fight, even when facing massive casualties and destruction at their end. The young North Vietnamese were idealistically and innocently patriotic, ready to give the ultimate sacrifice for the "liberation of the South" and the "unification of the motherland".

In 1960, at the Third Party Congress of the Vietnamese Communist Party, renamed the Labor Party since 1951, Lê Duẩn arrived from the South and strongly advocated the use of revolutionary warfare to topple Diệm's government, unifying the country, and establish communism nationwide. Despite some elements in the Party opposing the use of force, Lê Duẩn won the seat of First Secretary of the Party. As Hồ Chí Minh was aging, Lê Duẩn virtually took the helm of war from him. The first step of his war plan was coordinating a rural uprising in the South (Đồng Khởi) and forming the Viet Cong or National Front for the Liberation of South Vietnam (NLF) toward the end of 1960. The figurehead leader of the Viet Cong was Nguyễn Hữu Thọ, a South Vietnamese lawyer, but the true leadership was the Communist Party hierarchy in South Vietnam. Arms, supplies, and troops came from North Vietnam into South Vietnam via a system of trails, named the Ho Chi Minh trail, that branched into Laos and Cambodia before entering South Vietnam. At first, most foreign aid for North Vietnam came from China, as Lê Duẩn distanced Vietnam from the "revisionist" policy of the Soviet Union under Nikita Khrushchev. However, under Leonid Brezhnev, the Soviet Union picked up the pace of aid and provided North Vietnam with heavy weapons, such as T-54 tanks, artillery, MIG fighter planes, surface-to-air missiles etc.

=== The Tet Offensive and the end of the war ===
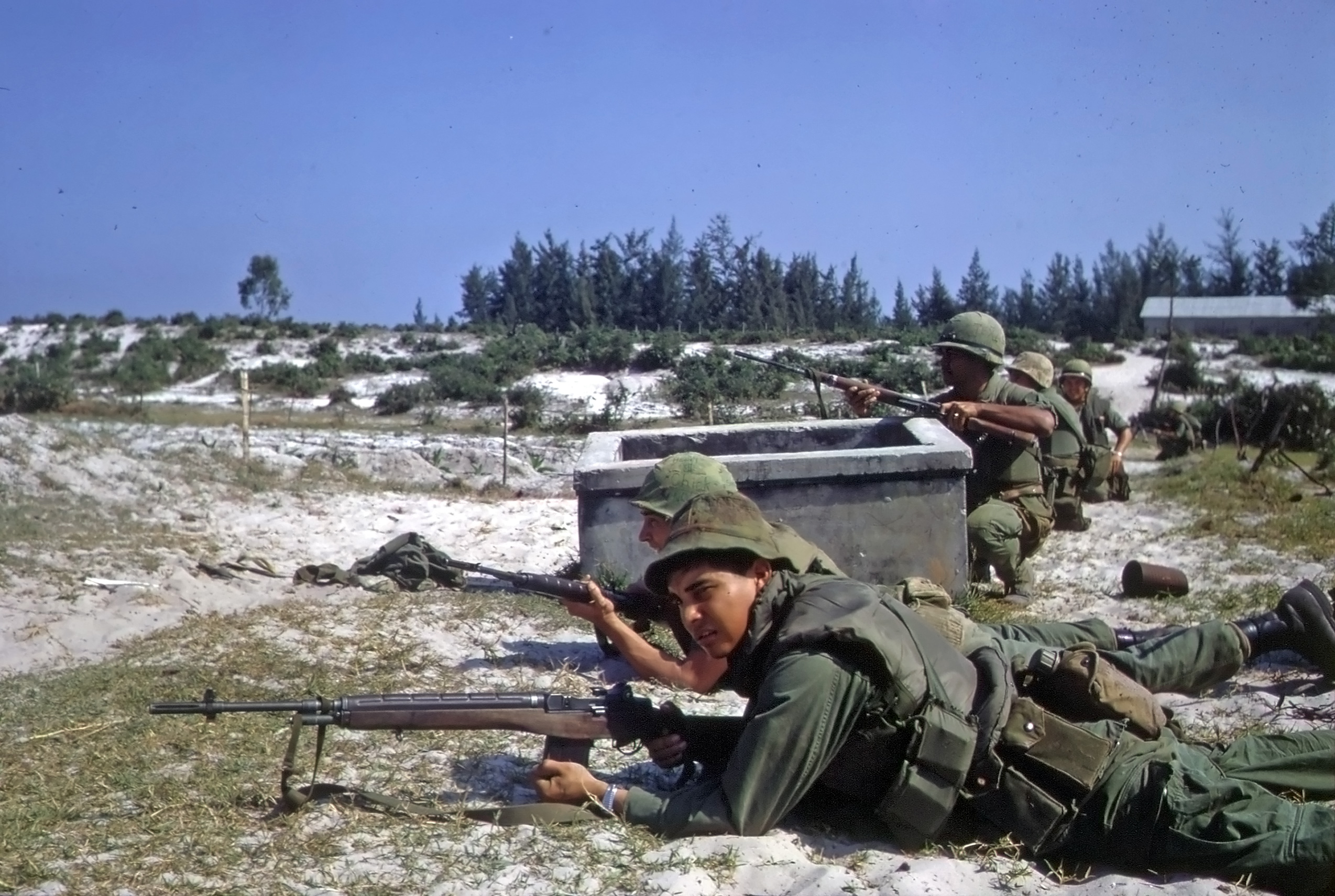
US military defending a position during the Tet Offensive, 1968

In 1968, the Viet Cong launched a massive and surprise Tết Offensive (known in South Vietnam as "Biến Cố Tết Mậu Thân" or in the North as "Cuộc Tổng Tấn Công và Nổi Dậy Tết Mậu Thân"), attacking almost all major cities in South Vietnam over the Vietnamese New Year (Tết). The Viet Cong and North Vietnamese captured the city of Huế, after which many mass graves were found. Many of the executed victims had relations with the South Vietnamese government or the US, or part of social groups that were considered enemies to the Viet Cong, like Catholics, business owners and intellectuals (Thảm Sát Tết Mậu Thân). Over the course of the year the Viet Cong forces were pushed out of all cities in South Vietnam and nearly decimated. In subsequent major offensives in later years, North Vietnamese regulars with artillery and tanks took over the fighting. In the months following the Tet Offensive, an American unit massacred civilian villagers, suspected to be sheltering Viet Cong guerillas, in the hamlet of My Lai in Central Vietnam, causing an uproar in protest around the world.

In 1969, Hồ Chí Minh died, leaving wishes that his body be cremated. However, the Communist Party embalmed his body for public display and built the Ho Chi Minh Mausoleum on Ba Đình Square in Hà Nội, in the style of Lenin's Mausoleum in Moscow.

Although the Tết Offensive was a catastrophic military defeat for the Việt Cộng, it was a stunning political victory as it led many Americans to view the war as unwinnable. U.S. President Richard Nixon entered office with a pledge to end the war "with honor." He normalized US relations with China in 1972 and entered into détente with the USSR. Nixon thus forged a new strategy to deal with the Communist Bloc, taking advantage of the rift between China and the Soviet Union. A costly war in Vietnam begun to appear less effective for the cause of Communist containment. Nixon proposed "Vietnamization" of the war, with South Vietnamese troops taking charge of the fighting, yet still receiving American aid and, if necessary, air and naval support. The new strategy started to show some effects: in 1970, troops from the Army of the Republic of Vietnam (ARVN) successfully conducted raids against North Vietnamese bases in Cambodia (Cambodian Campaign); in 1971, the ARVN made an incursion into Southern Laos to cut off the Ho Chi Minh trail in Operation Lam Son 719, but the operation failed as most high positions captured by ARVN forces were recaptured by North Vietnamese artillery; in 1972, the ARVN successfully held the town of An Lộc against massive attacks from North Vietnamese regulars and recaptured the town of Quảng Trị near the demilitarised zone (DMZ) in the center of the country during the Easter Offensive.

At the same time, Nixon was pressing both Hanoi and Saigon to sign the Paris Peace Agreement of 1973, for American military forces to withdraw from Vietnam. The pressure on Hanoi materialized with the Christmas Bombings in 1972. In South Vietnam, Nguyễn Văn Thiệu vocally opposed any accord with the Communists, but was threatened with withdrawal of American aid.

Despite the peace treaty, the North violated the treaty and continued the war as had been envisioned by Lê Duẩn and the South still tried to recapture lost territories. In the U.S., Nixon resigned after the Watergate scandal. South Vietnam was seen as losing a strong backer. Under U.S. President Gerald Ford, the Democratic-controlled Congress became less willing to provide military support to South Vietnam.

In 1974, South Vietnam also fought and lost the Battle of Hoàng Sa, in defending the islands against the invading Chinese over the control of the Paracel Islands in the South China Sea. Neither North Vietnam nor the U.S. were involved.

In early 1975, North Vietnamese military led by General Văn Tiến Dũng launched a massive attack against the Central Highland province of Buôn Mê Thuột. South Vietnamese troops had anticipated attack against the neighboring province of Pleiku, and were caught off guard. President Nguyễn Văn Thiệu ordered the moving of all troops from the Central Highland to the coastal areas, as with shrinking American aid, South Vietnamese forces could not afford to spread too thin. However, due to lack of experience and logistics for such a large troop movement in such a short time, the whole South Vietnamese 2nd Corps got bogged down on narrow mountain roads, flooded with thousands of civilian refugees, and was decimated by ambushes along the way. The South Vietnamese First Corps near the DMZ was cut off, received conflicting orders from Saigon on whether to fight or to retreat, and eventually collapsed. Many civilians tried to flee to Saigon via land, air, and sea routes, suffering massive casualties along the way. In early April 1975, South Vietnam set up a last-ditch defense line at Xuân Lộc, under commander Lê Minh Đảo. North Vietnamese troops failed to penetrate the line and had to make a detour, which the South Vietnamese failed to stop due to lack of troops. President Nguyễn văn Thiệu resigned. Power fell to Dương Văn Minh.

Dương Văn Minh had led the coup against Diệm in 1963. By the mid-1970s, he had leaned toward the "Third Party" (Thành Phần Thứ Ba), South Vietnamese elites who favored dialogues and cooperation with the North. Communist infiltrators in the South tried to work out political deals to let Dương Văn Minh ascend to the Presidency, with the hope that he would prevent a last stand, a destructive battle for Saigon. Although many South Vietnamese units were ready to defend Saigon, and the ARVN 4th Corps was still intact in the Mekong Delta, Dương Văn Minh ordered a surrender on April 30, 1975, sparing Saigon from destruction. Nevertheless, the reputation of the North Vietnamese army towards perceived traitors preceded them, and hundreds of thousands of South Vietnamese fled the country by all means: airplanes, helicopters, ships, fishing boats, and barges. Most were picked up by the U.S. Seventh Fleet in the South China Sea or landed in Thailand. The seaborne refugees came to be known as "boat people". In a famous case, a South Vietnamese pilot, with his wife and children aboard a small Cessna plane, landed safely without a tailhook on the aircraft carrier USS Midway. This mass exodus of (mostly South) Vietnamese political refugees continued into the 1980s as refugees fled from persecution, political oppression and economic collapse caused by the new Communist regime.

== Socialist Republic (1976–1991) ==
In 1976, Vietnam was officially unified and renamed the Socialist Republic of Vietnam (SRVN), with its capital in Hà Nội. The unified regime was dominated by holdovers from the North, and the flag and anthem of North Vietnam became the flag and anthem of unified Vietnam.

The Vietnamese Communist Party dropped its front name "Labor Party" and changed the title of First Secretary, a term used by China, to General Secretary, used by the Soviet Union, with Lê Duẩn as general secretary. The Viet Cong was dissolved. The Party emphasized development of heavy industry and collectivization of agriculture. Over the next few years, private enterprises were seized by the government and their owners were often sent to the New Economic Zones—a communist euphemism for a thick jungle—to clear land. The farmers were coerced into state-controlled cooperatives. Transportation of food and goods between provinces was deemed illegal except by the government. Within a short period of time, Vietnam was hit with severe shortages of food and basic necessities. Due to a combination of factors including trade embargoes, exceptional floods, material shortages and peasant resistance, the Mekong Delta, once a world-class rice-producing area, was threatened with famine. During the mid-1980s, inflation reached triple figures.

In foreign relations, the SRVN became increasingly aligned with the Soviet Union by both joining the Council for Mutual Economic Assistance (Comecon), and signing a Friendship Pact, which was in fact a military alliance. Tension between Vietnam and China mounted together with China's rivalry with the Soviet Union and conflict erupted with Cambodia, China's ally. Vietnam was also subject to trade embargoes by the U.S. and its allies.

The SRVN government implemented a Stalinist dictatorship of the proletariat in the South as they had done in the North. The security apparatus network (Công An: literally "Public Security", a communist term for the security apparatus) controlled every aspect of people's lives. Censorship was strict and ultra-conservative, with most pre-1975 works in the fields of music, art, and literature being banned. All religions had to be re-organized into state-controlled churches. Any negative comments toward the Party, the government, Uncle Ho, or anything related to Communism might earn the person the tag of Phản Động (Reactionary), with consequences ranging from being harassed by police, expelled from school or workplace, to being sent to prison. Nevertheless, the Communist authorities failed to suppress the black market, where food, consumer goods, and banned literature could be bought at high prices. The security apparatus also failed to stop a nationwide clandestine network of people trying to escape the country. In many cases, the security officers of entire districts were bribed and even got involved in organizing the escape schemes.

=== Refugees ===
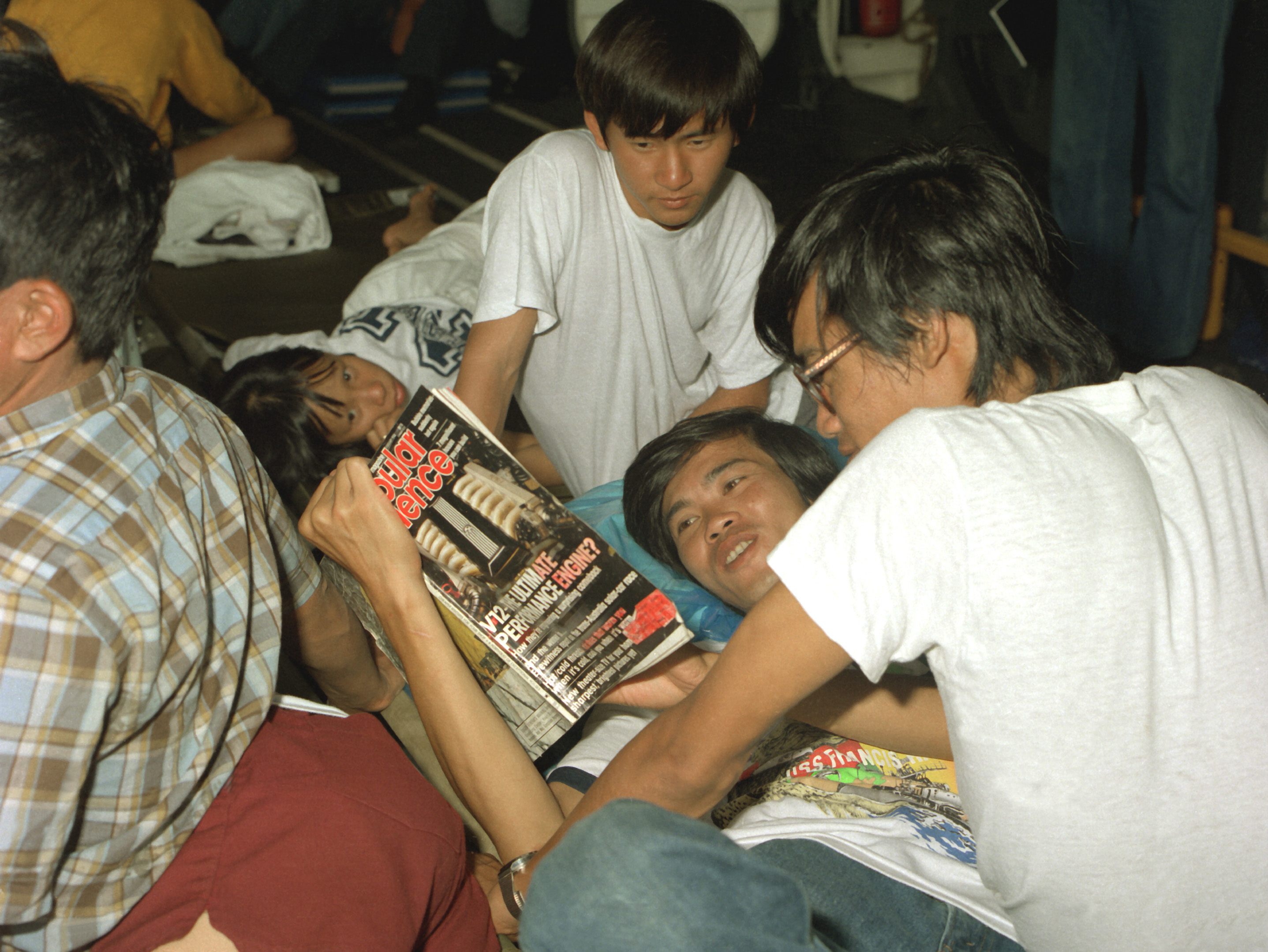
Vietnamese refugees abroad USS Fife, 1989

These living conditions resulted in the exodus of over a million Vietnamese people secretly escaping the country either by sea or overland through Cambodia. For the people fleeing by sea, their wooden boats were often not seaworthy, were packed with people like sardines, and lacked sufficient food and water. Many were caught or shot at by the Vietnamese coast guards, and many perished at sea due to boats sinking, capsizing in storms, starvation and thirst. Another major threat was the pirates in the Gulf of Thailand, who viciously robbed, raped, and murdered the boat people. In many cases, they massacred the whole boat. Sometimes the women were raped for days before being sold into prostitution. The people who crossed Cambodia faced equal dangers with mine fields, and the Khmer Rouge and Khmer Serei guerillas, who also robbed, raped, and killed the refugees. Some were successful in fleeing the region and landed in numbers in Malaysia, Indonesia, the Philippines, and Hong Kong, only to wind up in United Nations refugee camps. Some famous camps were Bidong in Malaysia, Galang in Indonesia, Bataan in the Philippines and Songkla in Thailand. Some managed to travel as far as northern Australia in crowded, open boats. All foreign missionaries were expelled from Vietnam, including the most famous Salesian priest, Servant of God Andrej Majcen (1907–1999) from Yugoslavia (now Slovenia).

While most refugees were resettled to other countries within five years, others languished in these camps for over a decade. In the 1990s, refugees who could not find asylum were deported back to Vietnam. Communities of Vietnamese refugees arrived in the US, Canada, Australia, France, West Germany, and the UK. The refugees often sent relief packages packed with necessities, such as medicines and sanitary goods to their relatives in Vietnam to help them survive. Very few would send money as it would be exchanged far below market rates by the Vietnamese government.

=== Cambodia and conflict with China ===
Despite the defeat of South Vietnam, there was no serious demobilization of the Vietnamese People's Army, which remained one of Asia's largest militaries at over one million troops, or sign that warfare was coming to an end anytime soon. Not only were Vietnamese soldiers highly experienced from decades of fighting, but also had acquired a large cache of captured US and South Vietnamese armaments. Vietnam soon found itself drawn into conflict with Cambodia, which had been ruled by the communist Khmer Rouge since 1975. In addition to this, Sino-Vietnamese relations deteriorated quite rapidly following Mao Zedong's death in 1976 due to Hanoi's unremitting loyalty to the Soviet Union, which was at odds with China during the 1970s. By 1978, most trade and material assistance programs between the two countries had ceased and Vietnam forbade Chinese ships from docking at its ports. As the Khmer Rouge were allies of Beijing, this further aggravated tensions and following border skirmishes, the VPA launched a full-scale armed invasion of Cambodia during the first week of 1979. This had the effect however of causing conflict with China and during a visit to the US in February, Deng Xiaoping stated that "It may be necessary to teach Vietnam a lesson." A large Chinese force invaded the Vietnamese border area, but with China still suffering the effects of the Cultural Revolution, the People's Liberation Army was seriously deficient in training, equipment, and communications. Over 30,000 Chinese troops were killed or wounded in three weeks of battling Vietnamese border guards and militia (the VPA was then in Cambodia and had no involvement in the war). Shortly afterwards, they withdrew with Beijing proclaiming that the aforementioned "lesson" had been taught as in any case, the fighting caused extensive destruction to Vietnam's infrastructure along the border.

In Cambodia, the Vietnamese invasion had stopped the genocide of millions of Cambodians by the Khmer Rouge. The pro-Vietnamese People's Republic of Kampuchea was created with Heng Samrin as chairman in January 1979. Pol Pot's Khmer Rouge allied with non-Communist guerrilla forces led by Norodom Sihanouk and Son Sann to fight against the Vietnamese forces and the new Phnom Penh regime. Some high-ranking officials of the Heng Samrin regime in the early 1980s resisted Vietnamese control, resulting in a purge that removed Pen Sovan, prime minister and general secretary of the Kampuchean People's Revolutionary Party. The war lasted until 1989 when Vietnam withdrew its troops and handed the administration of Cambodia to the United Nations.

=== Government and economy 1975–1991 ===
Vietnam's third Constitution, based on that of the USSR, was written in 1980. The Communist Party was stated by the Constitution to be the only party to represent the people and to lead the country. In 1980, cosmonaut Phạm Tuân became the first Vietnamese and the first Asian to go into space, traveling on the Soviet Soyuz 37 to service the Salyut 6 space station. During the early 1980s, a number of overseas Vietnamese organizations were created with the aim of overthrowing the Vietnamese Communist government through armed struggle. Most groups attempted to infiltrate Vietnam but eventually were eliminated by Vietnamese security and armed forces.

Overall, the first decade after reunification was not a happy time for the country. Nonstop warfare consumed large amounts of Vietnam's resources, both financially and by depleting the labor force of young men. The country remained internationally isolated, having little contact with nations outside COMECON members, and faced with a huge, hostile neighbor to the north. Despite repeated overtures to the United States, attempts to reestablish diplomatic relation were hampered by the question of missing US soldiers from the war and President Ronald Reagan's vocal hostility towards the country's principle benefactor in Moscow. In a 1981 interview with American journalist Stanley Karnow, Premier Phạm Văn Đồng remarked "Yes, we defeated the United States, but now we are a poor undeveloped nation and barely have enough to eat. Hence the saying that waging war is easy, but running a country is hard."

Compounding all this was the complete failure of the Five-Year Plan adopted in 1976, as Vietnam remained one of the world's poorest countries with a per-capita GDP of less than US$300 and almost totally dependent on Soviet aid, which reached as much as US$3 billion a year by 1982. Moscow faced mounting pressure from its Warsaw Pact allies to reduce outlays to Vietnam. Soviet-Vietnamese relations were also harmed by the former's wishes to have greater involvement in Vietnam's economic development and increased access to military facilities. In 1982, the VCP held its 5th National Congress in which General Secretary Lê Duẩn stated that "The Party wishes sternly to criticize itself." and "Our nation's manifold difficulties, while aggravated by outside circumstances that could not be helped, are nonetheless worsened by the various errors and shortcoming of officials." Le also expressed his dismay at the average age of the party leadership, noting that there was only one person on the Central Committee under 60.

That year, a general purge of the party ranks began to weed out elderly and inefficient cadres and replace them with younger men. Võ Văn Kiệt, aged 59, was promoted to head of the State Planning Commission, and 62-year-old Foreign Minister Nguyễn Cơ Thạch was elevated to Politburo membership. More surprising was the removal of General Võ Nguyên Giáp, considered a national hero, from the Politburo (it was later speculated that he was removed by political rivals). This rejuvenation campaign was nonetheless diminished by the fact that the country's three most powerful individuals, Lê Duẩn, Phạm Văn Đồng, and President Trường Chinh, showed no sign of stepping down any time soon despite their combined age of 226 and clearly failing health (all of them visited Moscow for medical treatment during 1982). Although they saw the need for reforms and fighting corruption, such change was beyond their ability by this point.

The Second Five Year Plan was adopted for 1981 and showed a clear move towards more market reforms and away from the rigid central planning of the 1976–80 scheme. Real change would not begin until the second half of the decade when Lê Duẩn died in July 1986, succeeded as general secretary by Trường Chinh. However, Trường was expelled only five months later and replaced by Nguyễn Văn Linh, eight years his junior. Phạm Văn Đồng retired as premier in 1987. Upon their accession, the country's new leadership denounced their geriatric predecessors for "utterly failing to improve the people's living standards, check corruption, or instill a more flexible, non-dogmatic outlook on life."

== Contemporary Vietnam (since 1992) ==
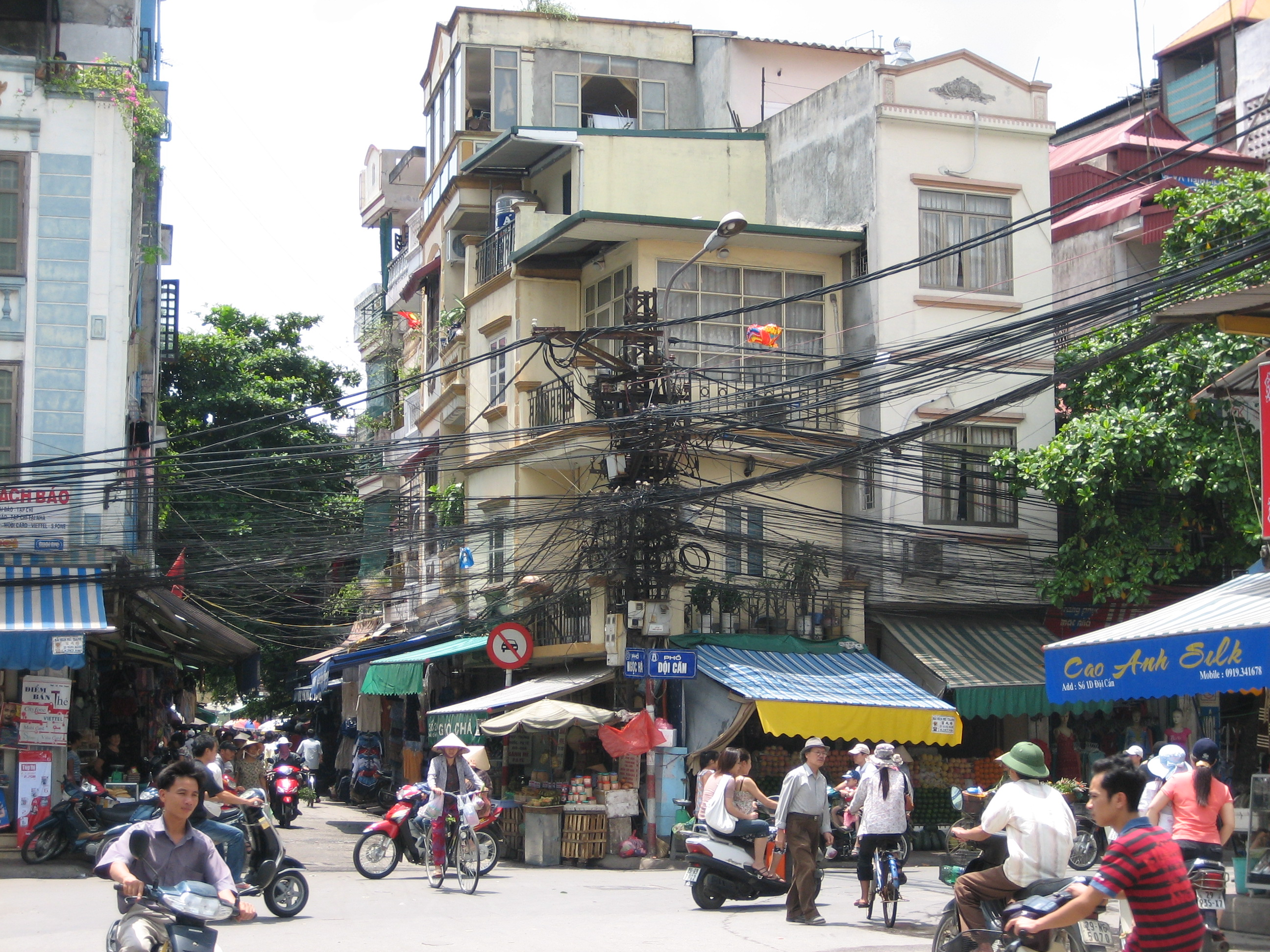
Hanoi in 2007

During the late 1980s, Vietnam began tentative market reforms along the model then being adopted by China. The basis for these experiments were in the south which had a stronger tradition of trade and commerce. The perestroika policies of Soviet leader Mikhail Gorbachev were also a source of motivation. Although communist governments in Eastern Europe were collapsing in 1989, Vietnam was kept comparatively isolated from these events due to its poverty and geographical distance and a few small pro-democracy protests in Hanoi were quickly suppressed. The fall of the Soviet Union in 1991 caused a thaw in the long hostile Sino-Vietnamese relations as the two nations embraced each other as some of the only surviving communist states.

Soon after the Paris Agreement on Cambodia resolved the conflict in October 1991, however, Vietnam established or reestablished diplomatic and economic relations with most of Western Europe, and several Asian countries. In February 1994, the United States lifted its economic embargo against Vietnam, and in June 1995, the United States and Vietnam normalized relations. After President Bill Clinton visited Vietnam in 2000, a new era of Vietnam began. No other U.S. leader had ever officially visited Hanoi and Clinton was the first to visit Vietnam since U.S. troops withdrew from the country in 1975. In June 2005, a high-level Vietnamese delegation, led by Prime Minister Phan Văn Khải, visited the United States and met with their U.S. counterparts, including President George W. Bush. This was the first such visit in 30 years. Although the visit mostly went well, a few embarrassing events occurred such as the White House's official website accidentally depicting the flag of South Vietnam in its official announcement of the visit. This provoked dismay and hostile comments from the Vietnamese government until the White House officially apologized and corrected the webpage. In addition, a crowd of hostile protesters gathered outside the White House during Phan's meeting with President Bush denouncing the Vietnamese Communist Party and waving South Vietnamese flags.

In late 2005, a three-person collective leadership was responsible for governing Vietnam. This triumvirate consisted of the VCP general secretary (Nông Đức Mạnh, 22 April 2001 – 19 January 2011), the prime minister (Phan Văn Khải, 25 September 1997 – 27 June 2006), and the president (Trần Đức Lương, 24 September 1997 – 26 June 2006). General Secretary Manh headed up not only the VCP but also the 15-member Politburo. President Luong was chief of state, and Prime Minister Khai was head of government. The leadership was promoting a "socialist-oriented market economy" and friendly relations with the European Union, Russia, and the United States. Although the leadership was presiding over a period of rapid economic growth, official corruption and a widening gap between urban wealth and rural poverty remained stubborn problems that were eroding the VCP's authority. In 2006, Vietnam hosted the APEC Annual Summit and became the 150th member state of WTO (World Trade Organization) on 11 January 2007, after concluding bilateral agreements with the United States, Australia, New Zealand, Mexico, and the Dominican Republic in order to qualify for membership. In the summer of 2011, spontaneous mass demonstrations erupted in Hanoi and Saigon, where thousands of Vietnamese protested China's increasing military aggression and encroachment into Vietnamese waters and territories in the South China Sea. The authorities moved in to break up the protests after an official complaint was lodged by the Chinese embassy in Hanoi, as the VCP's official policy since the 1990s has been one of good relations with Beijing and there was no desire on their part to disrupt the status quo.

In 2013, a baby girl named Nguyen Thi Thuy Dung was born and was officially designated Vietnam's official 90 millionth citizen.

However, Vietnam also faces disputes, mostly with Cambodia over their shared border, and especially with China, over the South China Sea. In 2016, President Barack Obama became the 3rd U.S. Head of State to visit Vietnam. His historic visit helped to normalize relations with Vietnam. This improvement of U.S-Vietnam relations was further increased by the lifting of a lethal arms embargo, allowing the Vietnamese government to buy lethal weapons and modernize its military.

On 27–28 February 2019, the 2019 North Korea–United States Hanoi Summit was held between North Korean supreme leader Kim Jong Un and U.S. president Donald Trump in Hanoi, Vietnam.

According to the World Bank, Vietnam has been a development success story. Its economic reforms since the beginning of Đổi Mới in 1986 have helped to change Vietnam from being one of the world’s poorest nations to a middle-income economy in one generation.

In 2021, General Secretary of the Communist Party, Nguyen Phu Trong, was re-elected for his third term in office, meaning he is Vietnam's most powerful leader in decades.

In 2023, a three-person collective leadership was responsible for governing Vietnam. President Vo Van Thuong (since 2023), Prime Minister Pham Minh Chinh (since 2021) and the most powerful leader, General Secretary Nguyễn Phú Trọng (since 2011), leading the only legal political party, as the Communist Party of Vietnam’s General Secretary.

On 3 August 2024, following the death of Nguyễn Phú Trọng, President Tô Lâm was promoted to General Secretary of the Communist Party of Vietnam and Secretary of the Central Military Commission by the 13th Central Committee, making him Vietnam's new leader.
