= 1946 North Vietnamese legislative election =

- 6 January 1946
- 302 of the 403 seats in the National Assembly
Party	Leader	Seats
Indochinese Communist Party	Ho Chi Minh	182
Democratic Party	Dương Đức Hiền	45
Socialist Party	Phan Tư Nghĩa	27
Việt Nam Quốc Dân Đảng	Vũ Hồng Khanh	26
Revolutionary League	Nguyễn Hải Thần	22
This lists parties that won seats. See the complete results below.

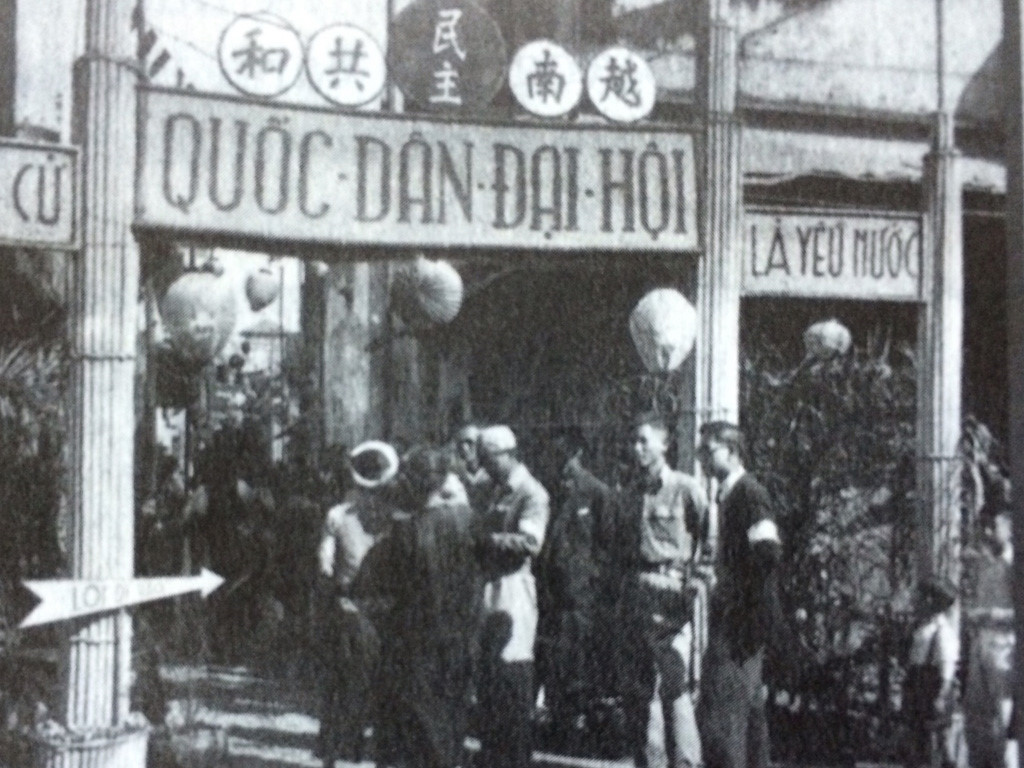
Preparing the National Assembly elections, Phất Lộc Lane, Hanoi in 1946.

National Assembly elections were held in areas controlled by the Democratic Republic of Vietnam on 6 January 1946. They resulted in a victory for the communist-dominated Viet Minh. Purportedly, communists won 182 of the 302 seats. Official documents indicate that 333 representatives were elected, plus 70 appointed representatives (50 from Quốc dân Đảng and 20 from Đồng minh Hội) under a pre-election agreement.

The election was largely controlled by the Viet Minh and was not genuinely democratic. The ballot was not secret and ballot papers were filled out in the presence of aides who were "to help comrades who had difficulty in making out their ballots."

== Background ==
On 8 September 1945, six days after the proclamation of independence, Ho Chi Minh signed decree 14 on the National Assembly elections. On 17 October he signed decree 15 detailing the regulations for the elections; turnout was required to be at least 25% to validate the results, all citizens over the age of 18 had the right to vote, and those over 21 could stand as candidates. On 11 November, as an effort to alleviate the fears of a Communist takeover, the Indochinese Communist Party announced its dissolution. However, it remained de facto in existence and in control of the Viet Minh.

== Conduct ==
Internal documents of the Communist Party indicate that they sought to preselect candidates; Communist partisans and Viet Minh members were instructed to run for seats without disclosing their affiliations. Holcombe characterizes the elections as "stage-managed public rituals" intended mainly to disguise a Party dictatorship.

== Results ==
According to Ho Chi Minh, voter turnout was approximately 82%. Other sources put turnout at 89%. Ho Chi Minh received the highest vote share (98.4%) of any candidate.

Graph of the party split among 302 seats.
Party	Seats
Indochinese Communist Party	182
Democratic Party of Vietnam	45
Socialist Party of Vietnam	27
Việt Nam Quốc Dân Đảng	26
Vietnam Revolutionary League	22
Total	302
Source: Hartmann (2001)
