= Democratic Party of Vietnam =

Political party in Vietnam (1944–1988)

Democratic Party of Vietnam Đảng Dân chủ Việt Nam
- Abbreviation: ĐDCVN
- President: Dương Đức Hiền
- Secretary-General: Nghiêm Xuân Yêm
- Founded: 30 July 1944 (82 years, 71 days)
- Dissolved: 20 October 1988 (37 years, 354 days)
- Ideology: Until 1954: Vietnamese nationalism Social democracy From 1954: Democratic socialism Marxism–Leninism
- Political position: Centre-left to far-left
- National affiliation: Vietnamese Fatherland Front

Party flag

The Democratic Party of Vietnam (Vietnamese: Đảng Dân chủ Việt Nam) was a political party in the Democratic Republic of Vietnam (later only North Vietnam). It was founded on 30 July 1944 to unite the petite bourgeoisie and intelligentsia in support of the Viet Minh, and in effect, its bloc party. It was a member of the Vietnamese Fatherland Front and was represented in the Vietnamese parliament and government, led by Dương Đức Hiền and Nghiêm Xuân Yêm. The party, along with the Socialist Party, was disbanded in 1988.

In 2006, a dissident organization with the same name was established. This organization is currently active as the 21st Century Democratic Party, Hoàng Minh Chính, a member of the former Democratic Party, was involved in its founding.

== History ==
This party was established in 1944, when Vietnam was still occupied by France. In 1945, it gained independence as Democratic Republic of Vietnam (August Revolution). It was a member of Vietnamese Fatherland Front and fought against France in a war for independence. During 1955–1988, it was one of only three parties that were allowed to operate in North Vietnam, and later the Socialist Republic of Vietnam following reunification. It was dissolved in 1988.

== Ideology ==
The ideologies of the party initially included social democracy and Vietnamese nationalism, but in 1954 these were replaced with democratic socialism and Marxism–Leninism. Its position ranged from centre-left to far-left.
