= Hoàng Minh Chính =

Vietnamese politician (1922–2008)

Hoàng Minh Chính (Note: In this Vietnamese name, the surname is Hoàng, but is often simplified to Hoang in English-language text. In accordance with Vietnamese custom, this person should be referred to by the given name, Chính.) (November 16, 1922 – February 7, 2008), also Trần Ngọc Nghiêm, was a Vietnamese politician and dissident. He was one of the best-known figures and ideologists of the Vietnamese Communist Party during the 1960s and held several key governmental positions. In the late 1960s, he criticized decisions made by his own party and was sent to jail three times.

== Early life ==
Chính was born in 1922 in the province of Nam Dinh, French Tokin and joined the communist revolution in 1937. He was later trained in politics in the Soviet Union during the late 1950s.

== Political career ==
From 1960 to 1967, Chính was named during his political tenure in various key positions inside the North government, including vice-minister of education and director of the Marxist Institute of Philosophy.

Chính was opposed to any military action against the southern half of Vietnam (Republic of Vietnam) during the Vietnam War and called for more democratic procedures within the ranks of the party. He would later become a member and the secretary general of the Democratic Party of Vietnam until it was dissolved in 1986. (Note: together with Socialist Party, the other legal 'non-communist' party in North Vietnam)

In 1967, Chính wrote a 200-page document criticizing the policies made by the Communist Party and was jailed twice for a total of eleven years and was under house arrest until 1990. However, Chính criticized his party once more and he was jailed for a third time in 1995 and remained under house arrest until his death. Despite constant government surveillance and his house arrest, Chính would continue to be involved in pro-democracy movements during the late 1990s.

In June 2006, he reactivated the Democratic Party of Vietnam.

== Later life ==
In 2005, Chính began to experience health problems. In a surprise move from the government, he was allowed to go to the United States to receive treatment for pancreatic cancer and was able to return to Vietnam despite opposition from the media after he made a speech in Congressional Committee at the United States House of Representatives on the situation in Vietnam and his criticism of the country repression on pro-democracy activists and its human rights record. After his return to Vietnam, there were reports that groups of plain-clothed police attacked him at his home. Briefly he returned as a member of the DPV.

== Death ==
Chính died at his home in Hanoi on February 7, 2008, aged 85, on the first day of the Tet Lunar New Year.
