= North Vietnam =

Country in Southeast Asia (1945–1976)

Democratic Republic of Vietnam Việt Nam Dân chủ Cộng hòa
- 1945–1976
- Flag (1955–1976) Emblem (1955–1976)
- Motto: "Độc lập – Tự do – Hạnh phúc" "Independence – Freedom – Happiness"
- Anthem: "Tiến quân ca" "The Song of the Marching Troops"
- Presidential seal (c. 1950–1969)

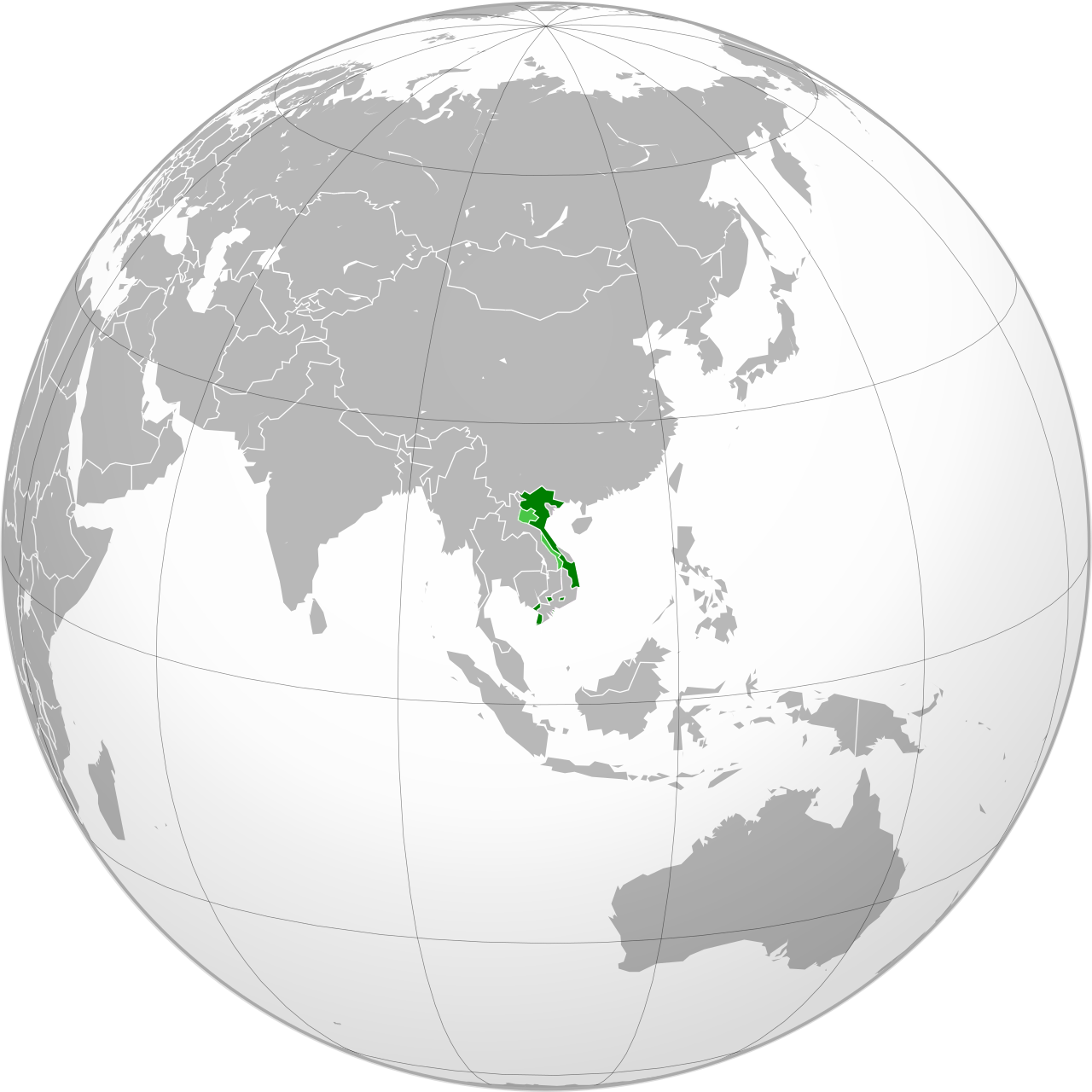
- Status: Unrecognized state (1945–1950); Limitedly recognized state (1950–1954) (Note: Communist China and the Soviet Union were the first countries to recognize the DRV in January 1950.); Sovereign state (1954–1976)
- Capital and largest city: Hanoi (Note: During the First Indochina War, the DRV lost control of the major cities but maintained control over scattered rural areas. The DRV government de facto operated from the mountainous Tuyên Quang–Thái Nguyên between 1947 and October 1954.); 21°01′42″N 105°51′15″E
- Official languages: Vietnamese
- Official script: Vietnamese alphabet
- Religion: State atheism
- Demonyms: North Vietnamese; Vietnamese
- Government: Unitary communist state
- Leader of the Worker's Party
  - 1945–1956: Trường Chinh (Note: as General Secretary)
  - 1956–1960: Hồ Chí Minh (Note: as General Secretary, also Chairman between 1951–1969)
  - 1960–1975: Lê Duẩn (Note: as First Secretary)
- President
  - 1946–1969: Hồ Chí Minh
  - 1969–1975: Tôn Đức Thắng
- Prime Minister
  - 1945–1955: Hồ Chí Minh
  - 1955–1975: Phạm Văn Đồng
- Legislature: National Assembly
- Historical era: Aftermath of World War II/Cold War
  - August Revolution: 19 August 1945
  - Abdication of Bảo Đại: 25 August 1945
  - State declared: 2 September 1945
  - Chinese occupation: September 1945–15 June 1946
  - Legislative election: 6 January 1946
  - Ho–Sainteny Agreement: 6 March 1946
  - Start of the Indochina War: 19 December 1946
  - Geneva Accords: 21 July 1954
  - Lê Duẩn's tenure as First Secretary: 10 September 1960
  - Vietnam War escalated: 1962
  - Death of Ho Chi Minh: 2 September 1969
  - Paris Peace Accords: 27 January 1973
  - Reunification: 30 April 1975
  - Socialist Republic of Viet Nam: 2 July 1976

Area
- 1955: 157,880 km^{2} (60,960 sq mi)

Population
  - 1945: c. 20 million (Note: No clear number due to internal turmoil in 1945, circa 20 million population based on last reliable estimate of 22.6 million people in 1943 (Barbieri, p. 625) and her estimate of 400,000 to 2 million dying from 1944–45 famine.)
  - 1955: 16,100,000
  - 1968: 18,700,000
  - 1974: 23,800,000
- GDP (PPP): 1960 estimate
  - Total: US$4,113 million
  - Per capita: $51
- Currency: đồng cash (until 1948)
Preceded by	Succeeded by
1945: Empire of Vietnam; 1954: State of Vietnam	1946: French Indochina; 1976: Socialist Republic of Vietnam
- Today part of: Vietnam

The Democratic Republic of Vietnam (DRV; Vietnamese: Việt Nam Dân chủ Cộng hòa – VNDCCH) was a country in Southeast Asia from 1945 to 1976, with sovereignty recognized in July 1954, after which it became commonly known as North Vietnam. A member of the communist Eastern Bloc, it opposed the anti-communist, French-associated State of Vietnam and later its successor state the Western-allied Republic of Vietnam (South Vietnam). North Vietnam launched a successful military offensive against South Vietnam in 1975 and was formally reunified with the South the following year to form the Socialist Republic of Vietnam.

After the 1940 Japanese invasion of French Indochina—of which the territories now comprising Vietnam were a part—Vietnamese communist revolutionary Hồ Chí Minh established the Việt Minh Front in 1941 to resist the Japanese occupation and achieve independence. The communist-led Viet Minh, cloaked in nationalism, was designed to appeal to a wider population than the Indochinese Communist Party could command.

During the August Revolution following Japan's surrender to end World War II, Hồ Chí Minh declared independence on 2 September 1945, proclaiming the Democratic Republic of Vietnam. From then, the Viet Minh sought to consolidate power by purging rival groups. Meanwhile, in the aftermath of World War II France fought to reassert its colonial dominance over its former colony of Cochinchina and the southern parts of its former territory of Annam, leading to the First Indochina War in December 1946. During this guerrilla war, the Viet Minh controlled most rural areas, and later, with assistance from Chinese communists, achieved the French defeat at Điện Biên Phủ in 1954. The negotiations in the Geneva Conference that year ended the war and affirmed Vietnamese independence.

The Geneva Accords provisionally divided the country into a northern zone and a southern zone along the 17th parallel, stipulating general elections scheduled for July 1956 to "bring about the unification of Viet-Nam". The northern zone was controlled by the Democratic Republic of Vietnam and became commonly called North Vietnam, while the southern zone, under control of the non-communist State of Vietnam, was commonly called South Vietnam.

Supervision of the implementation of the Geneva Accords was the responsibility of an international commission consisting of India, Canada, and Poland, respectively representing the non-aligned, the capitalist, and the communist blocs. The United States, which did not sign the Geneva Accords, stated that it would "continue to seek to achieve unity through free elections supervised by the United Nations to ensure that they are conducted fairly".

Meanwhile, the French-supported State of Vietnam strongly opposed the partition of the country, with its prime minister Ngô Đình Diệm announcing in July 1955 that the State of Vietnam would not participate in elections, claiming that it had not signed the Geneva Accords and was therefore not bound by it, and raising concerns that an unfair election would occur in North Vietnam under Việt Minh governance. In October 1955, Diệm's government held its own referendum, which was widely marred by electoral fraud, to depose Chief of State Bảo Đại; then established the Republic of Vietnam as the successor to the State of Vietnam, with Diệm as its first president.

Failure to unify the country by referendum led to the Vietnam War in 1955. Supported by their communist allies, mainly China and the Soviet Union, the northern People's Army of Vietnam and the southern National Liberation Front of South Vietnam (Viet Cong) guerrillas fought against the military forces of South Vietnam. Fearing that other countries in Southeast Asia would become communist, the United States intervened in the conflict along with Western Bloc forces from South Korea, Australia and Thailand, heavily supporting South Vietnam militarily. The conflict spread to neighboring countries, with North Vietnam supporting the Lao People's Liberation Army in the Laotian Civil War and the Khmer Rouge in the Cambodian Civil War against their respective US-supported governments. By 1973, the United States and its allies withdrew from the war, and unsupported South Vietnam was swiftly overrun by the communist forces.

The Vietnam War ended on 30 April 1975 and saw South Vietnam come under the control of the Việt Cộng's Provisional Revolutionary Government, which led to the reunification of Vietnam into the Socialist Republic of Vietnam on 2 July 1976. In the aftermath of the Vietnam War, the unified Vietnamese state experienced economic decline, refugee crises and conflicts with the Khmer Rouge in 1978 and with China in 1979. The expanded Socialist Republic retained a Soviet style of socialism as the basis of its political system and its economic system; and memberships in Eastern Bloc organisations such as COMECON; until the Đổi Mới economic reforms in 1986 and the collapse of the Soviet Union in 1991.

== Etymology ==
The official name of the state was the Democratic Republic of Vietnam. The South was known as the Republic of Vietnam.

Việt Nam ([vîət nāːm]) was the name adopted by Emperor Gia Long in 1804. It is thought to be a variation of Nam Việt ("Southern Việt"), a name used in ancient times. In 1839, Emperor Minh Mạng renamed the country Đại Nam ("Great South"). In 1945, the nation's official name was changed back to Vietnam. The name is also sometimes rendered as Viet Nam in English. The designation North Vietnam became common usage after 1954, when the Geneva Accords provisionally partitioned Vietnam into communist and non-communist zones.

== History ==
=== Hồ Chí Minh's leadership (1945–1960) ===
==== Proclamation of the republic ====
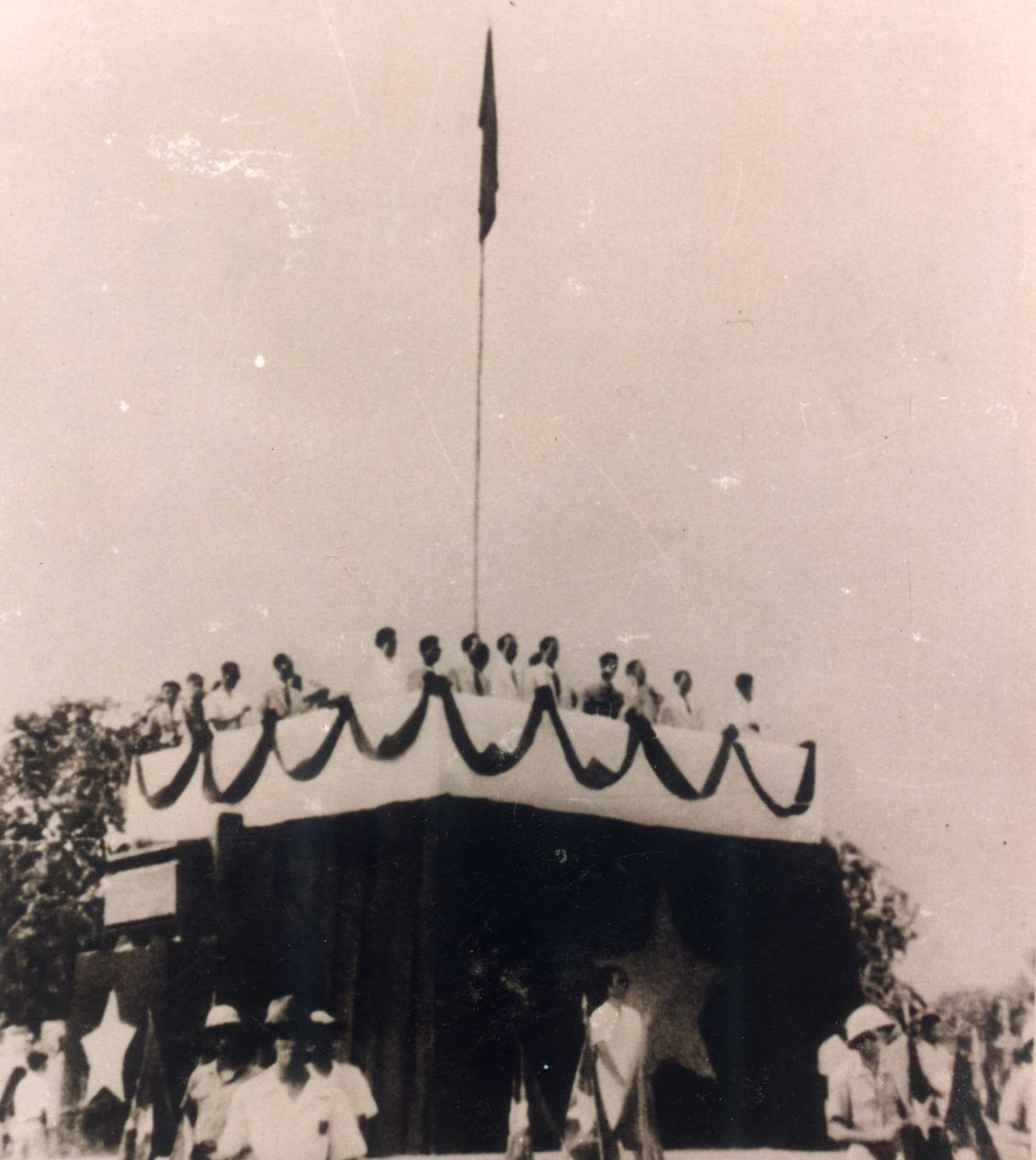
Ho Chi Minh declaring independence at Ba Dinh Square on September 2nd, 1945

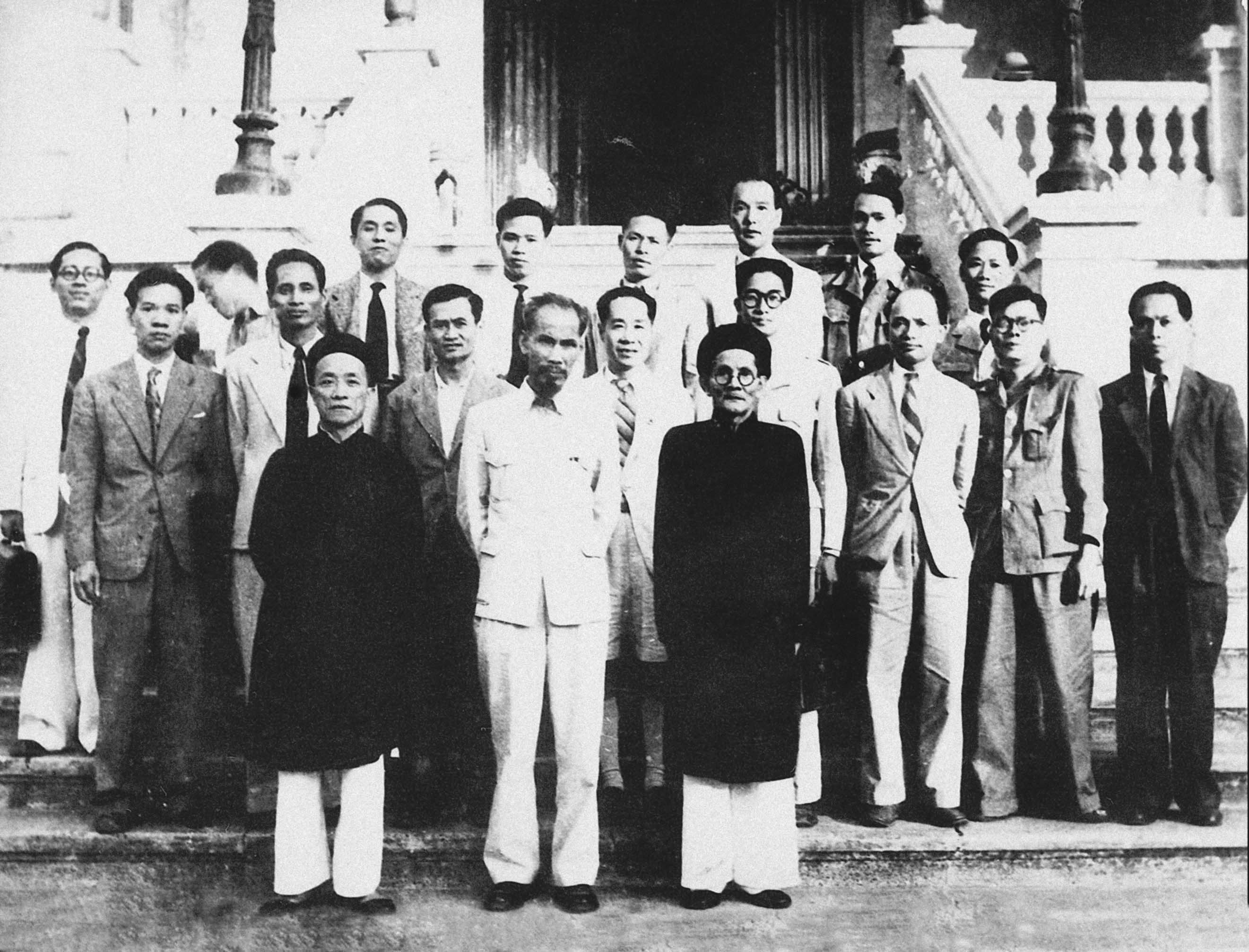
The DRV coalition government in early 1946

After nearly three centuries of partition by feudal dynasties, Vietnam was again under one single authority in 1802 when Gia Long founded the Nguyễn dynasty, but the country became a French protectorate after 1883 and under Japanese occupation after 1940 during World War II. US President Franklin D. Roosevelt was opposed to a return to French rule in Indochina, and proposed placing the region under United Nations trusteeship.

Soon after Japan surrendered, the Việt Minh in the August Revolution entered Hanoi, and the Democratic Republic of Vietnam was proclaimed on 2 September 1945 establishing independence and a new government for the country, replacing the Nguyễn dynasty. Hồ Chí Minh became leader of the Democratic Republic of Vietnam.

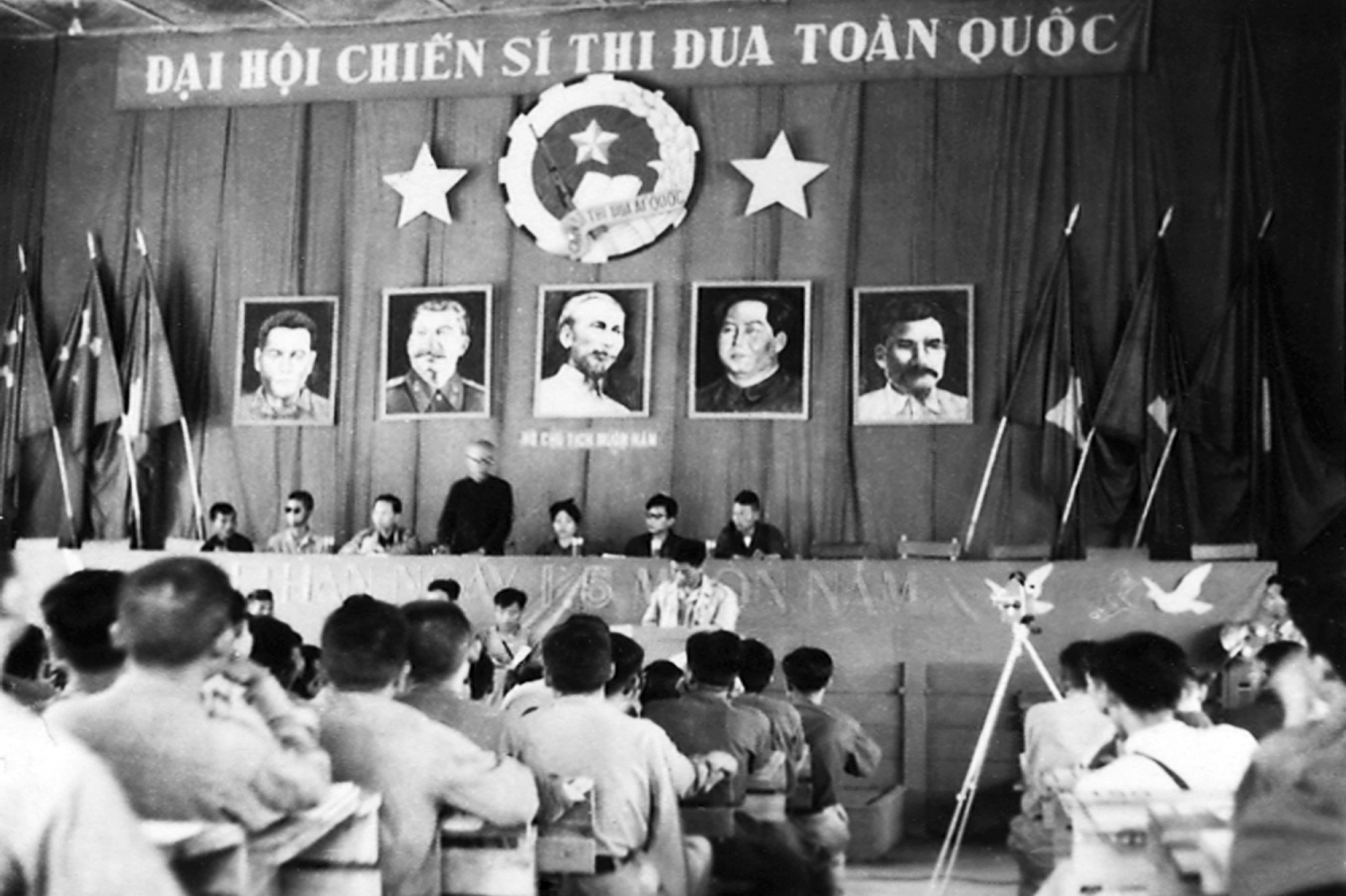
First Nationwide Congress of Emulation Fighters, 1952

==== Early periods ====
The Democratic Republic of Vietnam claimed sovereignty over all of Vietnam, but during this time, several areas, particularly in the South, were not aligned with the Viet Minh. The successive collapse of French, then Japanese power, followed by the disputes among the political factions, had been accompanied by widespread violence in the countryside. On 12 September 1945, the first British troops arrived in Saigon, and on 23 September 1945, French troops occupied the police stations, the post office, and other public buildings. In the north, the Chinese Nationalist Army arrived to disarm the Japanese, and the Chinese presence had forced Hồ Chí Minh and the Việt Minh to accommodate Kuomintang-supported Vietnamese nationalists. After the departure of the British in 1946, the French controlled the urban regions of Vietnam south of the 16th parallel following the Southern Resistance War. Meanwhile, the Viet Minh sought to consolidate power by terrorizing and purging rival Vietnamese nationalist groups and Trotskyist activists.

In January 1946, the Việt Minh held an election, mainly in the North, to establish a National Assembly. There were few competitive races and the party makeup of the Assembly was determined in advance of the vote. (Note: Although former emperor Bao Dai was also popular at this time and won a seat in the Assembly, the election did not allow voters to express a preference between Bao Dai and Ho Chi Minh. It was held publicly in northern and central Vietnam, but secretly in Cochinchina, the southern third of Vietnam. There was minimal campaigning and most voters had no idea who the candidates were. In many districts, a single candidate ran unopposed. Party representation in the Assembly was publicly announced before the election was held.) Former Prime Minister Trần Trọng Kim claimed there were places where people were forced to vote for the Việt Minh. Rumors of secret negotiations with the French were putting the Viet Minh at a disadvantage. In late February, gripped by despair, Hồ went so far as to ask Bảo Đại to take over the government. Before Bảo Đại could reach a decision, however, Hồ changed his mind after receiving assurances from the Chinese that they would pressure the nationalist parties to join the new government. The Vietnamese Nationalist Party (Việt Quốc) and the Vietnam Revolutionary League (Việt Cách) then accepted 70 assigned seats in the National Assembly, allowing the DRV to present the appearance of an inclusive government.

In March 1946, the Franco-Chinese and Ho–Sainteny Agreements enabled French forces to replace the Chinese north of the 16th parallel and facilitated a coexistence between the DRV and the French that strengthened the Viet Minh while undermining the nationalists. In June, Chinese Nationalist troops evacuated Hanoi, and on 15 June, the last detachments embarked at Haiphong.

With the Chinese Kuomintang withdrawal, Võ Nguyên Giáp resolved that the Viet Minh must consolidate full control of the government and promptly moved to secure a monopoly of power for the movement. That summer, the Viet Minh colluded with French forces to eliminate Vietnamese nationalists, targeted for their ardent anti-colonialism. It was reported that a force of about 13,000 nationalists was destroyed in Tonkin. Another estimate indicates that 15,000 were massacred across northern Vietnam.

When France declared Cochinchina, the southern third of Vietnam, a separate state as the "Autonomous Republic of Cochinchina" in June 1946; Vietnamese nationalists reacted with fury. In November 1946, the DRV's National Assembly adopted the first constitution.

==== First Indochina War ====
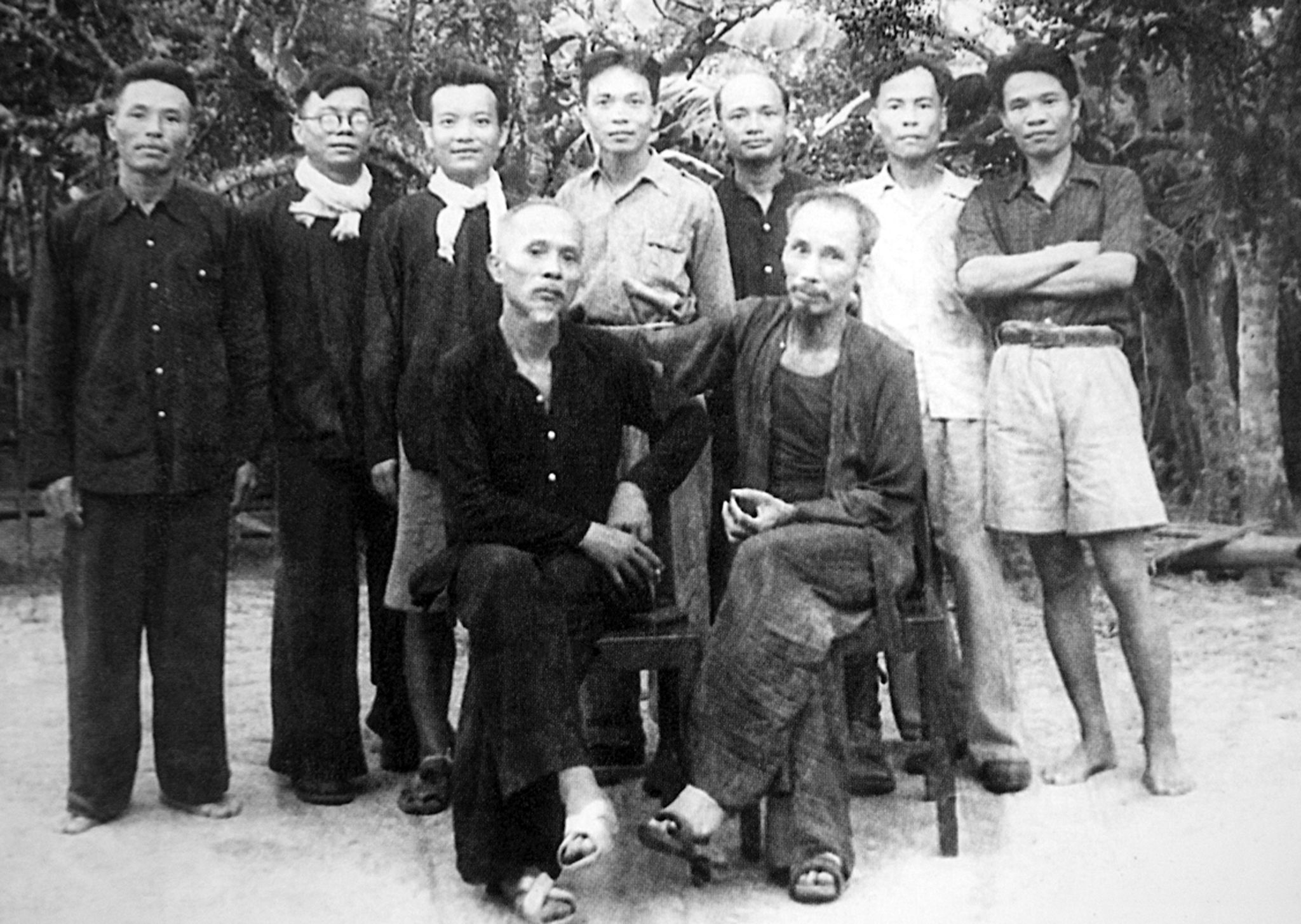
Ho Chi Minh (seated, right) with Tôn Đức Thắng (seated, left) and other DRV leaders in a liberated zone of northern Vietnam during the First Indochina War.

In the wake of the Hai Phong incident and the deterioration of the Fontainebleau Agreements, the French reoccupied Hanoi and the First Indochina War (1946–54) followed, during which many urban areas fell under French control. Following the Chinese Communist Revolution (1946–50), Chinese communist forces arrived on the border in 1949. Chinese aid revived the fortunes of the Viet Minh and transformed it from a guerrilla militia into a standing army. The outbreak of the Korean War in June 1950 transformed what had been an anti-colonial struggle into a Cold War battleground, with the U.S. providing financial support to the French.

The DRV became increasingly radicalized in 1948 as Indochinese Communist Party (ICP) leaders began looking beyond independence toward building a socialist regime. At its accession, the DRV state had accommodated urban elites, the colonial-trained bureaucracy, former officials of the Empire of Vietnam, and local mass organizations. However, these compromises fell apart in 1948 as internal conflict between communist and non-communist leaders escalated at many levels of government. The ICP valued its political cadres and distrusted educated professionals, managers, and intellectuals. Following the establishment of the Cominform and the Chinese Communist Party's victories in areas where Mao Zedong attributed success to the mobilization of landless peasants, the DRV adopted a more aggressive land policy. Although the ICP expanded rapidly, with its membership surging from 5,000 in late 1945 to about 180,000 by the end of 1948, the radical vision of ICP leaders met opposition among party members, who were mostly from the middle peasantry and higher social classes. Communist leaders resolved to eradicate judicial independence entirely. As Trường Chinh indicated, it was "now time for the Indochinese revolution to show its true colours," 1948 thus marked an irreversible, proletarian turn of the DRV toward a communist revolution.

With communist leaders no longer concealing their social revolutionary agenda and Chinese guidance, the DRV underwent further radicalization, including rectification (chỉnh huấn) campaigns to indoctrinate party members, soldiers, and government personnel in communist ideology. This process of radicalization, in which land reform was the latest and most radical, provoked widespread disillusionment and large-scale defections from the maquis to areas controlled by the French and the State of Vietnam (SVN), a phenomenon known as dinh tê. Among the defectors were numerous intellectuals, teachers, landlords, civil servants, soldiers, and cadres, including Phạm Duy, Trần Chánh Thành, Trần Ngọc Châu, and Nguyễn Văn Thiệu. Some joined the SVN, others entered existing anticommunist groups, and still others supported anticommunist nationalism in principle but adopted an attentiste (wait-and-see) stance. In the meantime, with Chinese communists' assistance, Giáp built and unleashed a remarkably modern army against the French in the decisive Battle of Dien Bien Phu in 1954.

==== Provisional military demarcation of Vietnam ====
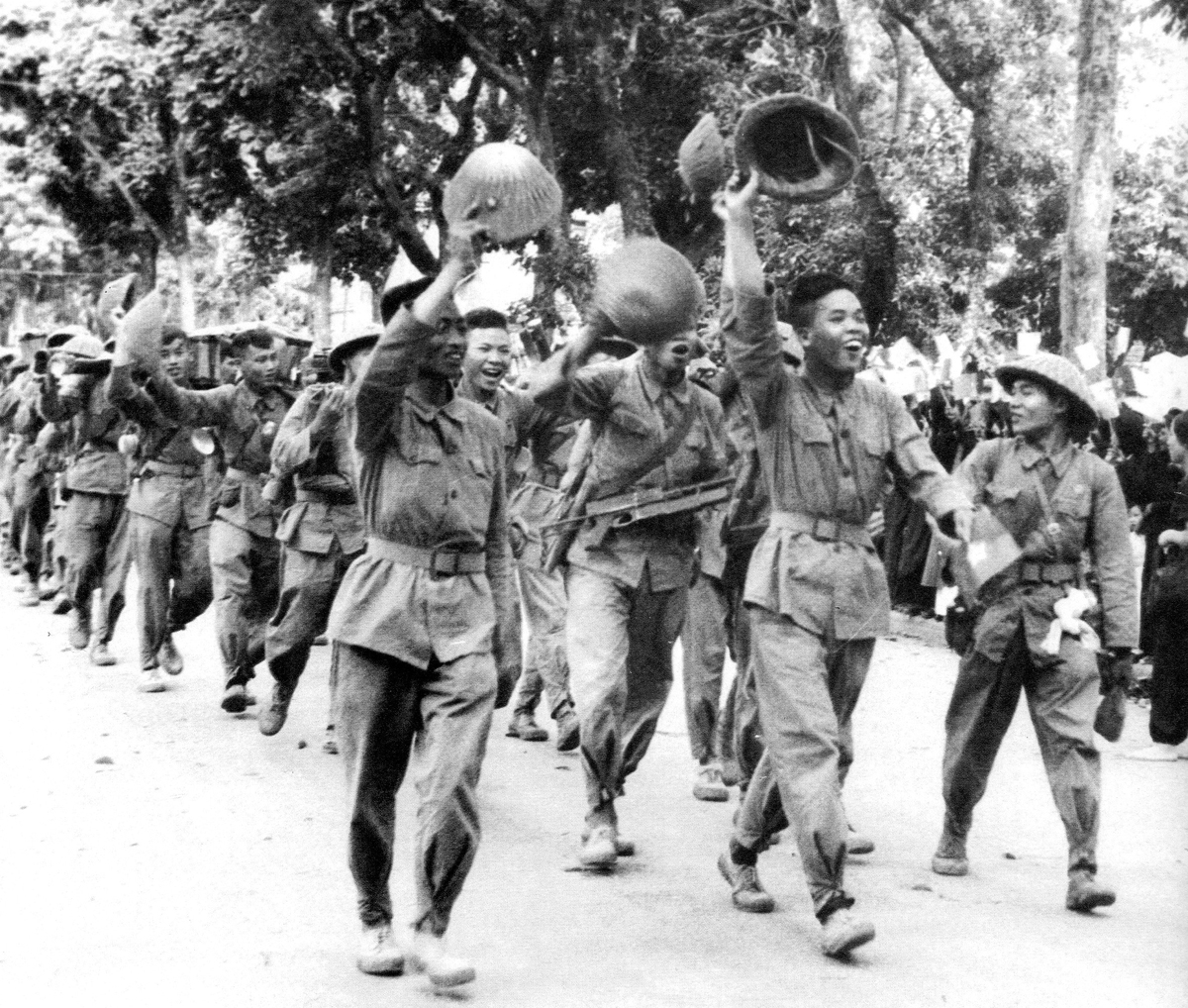
Viet Minh troops returning to Hanoi after the French withdrawal on October 9, 1954

Following the partition of Vietnam in 1954 at the end of the First Indochina War, more than one million North Vietnamese migrated to South Vietnam, many under the US-led evacuation campaign named Operation Passage to Freedom, with an estimated 60% of the north's one million Catholics fleeing south. The Catholic migration is attributed to an expectation of persecution of Catholics by the North Vietnamese government, as well as publicity employed by the Saigon government of the Prime Minister Ngo Dinh Diem. The CIA ran a propaganda campaign to get Catholics to come to the south. However Colonel Edward Lansdale, the man credited with the campaign, rejected the notion that his campaign had much effect on popular sentiment. The Viet Minh sought to detain or otherwise prevent would-be refugees from leaving, such as through intimidation through military presence, shutting down ferry services and water traffic, or prohibiting mass gatherings. Concurrently, between 14,000 and 45,000 civilians and approximately 100,000 Viet Minh fighters moved in the opposite direction.

=== Lê Duẩn's leadership (1960–1976) ===
==== Vietnam War ====
During 1962, North Vietnam intensified its war efforts by infiltrating military personnel and materiel into South Vietnam. Meanwhile, Beijing, following the Sino-Soviet split and rejecting Moscow's policy of "peaceful coexistence" with the West, backed Hanoi's escalation by providing the Viet Cong with vital small arms and heavier weaponry.

Reunification

After the fall of Saigon on 30 April 1975, the Provisional Revolutionary Government of the Republic of South Vietnam, or the Việt Cộng, alongside the North Vietnamese Army, governed South Vietnam for the next year. However it was seen as a vassal government of North Vietnam. North and South Vietnam were officially reunited on 2 July 1976 as the Socialist Republic of Vietnam. The merged country's government was dominated by holdovers from North Vietnam, and adopted the North Vietnamese constitution, flag and anthem.

== Government and politics ==
North Vietnam was a unitary and centralised state during the Vietnam War.

=== Constitution ===
As an ideologically Marxist–Leninist state, North Vietnam adopted a constitution modelled on Joseph Stalin's 1936 Constitution of the Soviet Union.

=== Administrative divisions ===
"The administrative units in the Democratic Republic of Vietnam are as follows:

- The country is divided into provinces (tỉnh), autonomous regions (khu tự trị), and centrally run cities (thành phố trực thuộc trung ương);
- The province is divided into districts (huyện), cities (thành phố), and towns (thị xã);
- The district is divided into communes (xã) and townships (thị trấn).
- Administrative units in the autonomous region are statutory."

— — Article 78, Constitution of the Democratic Republic of Vietnam – 1959 (Điều 78, Hiến pháp Việt Nam Dân chủ Cộng hòa – 1959).

==== Autonomous regions ====
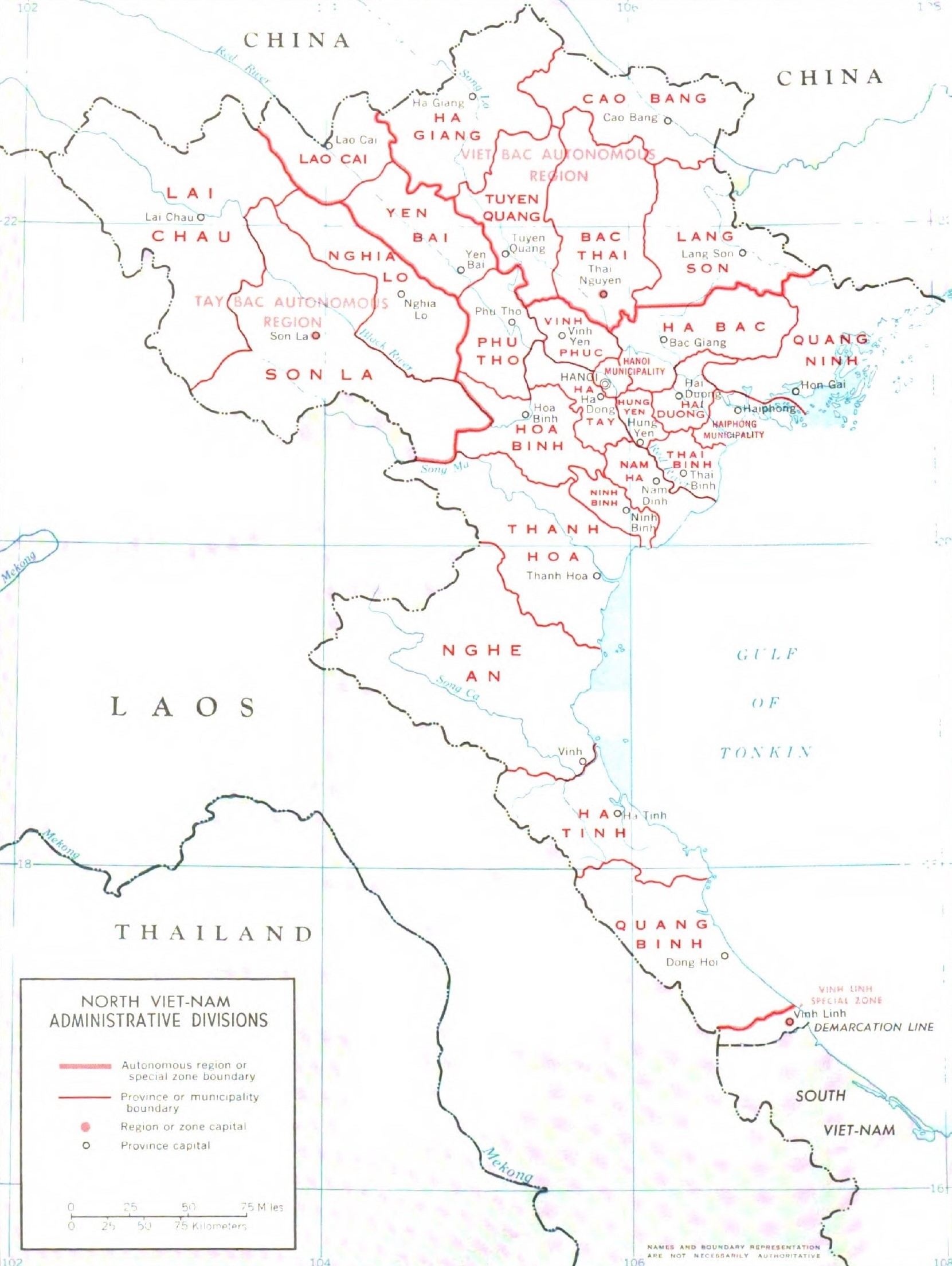
The autonomous regions of North Vietnam on a map of its provinces created by the government of the United States.

North Vietnam established a system of autonomous regions (Vietnamese: Khu tự trị) similar to (and based on) the autonomous regions of China. In recognising the traditional separatism of tribal minorities, this policy of accommodationism gave them self-government in exchange for acceptance of Hanoi's control. These regions existed from 1955 but following the merger of the Democratic Republic of Vietnam and the Republic of South Vietnam the system of autonomous regions was not continued and were fully abolished by 1978.

List of North Vietnamese autonomous regions and their subsidiary provinces:

- Thái-Mèo Autonomous Region (Khu tự trị Thái – Mèo, 1955–1962), later renamed Northwestern Autonomous Region (Khu tự trị Tây Bắc, 1962–1975)
  - Lai Châu
  - Sơn La
  - Nghĩa Lộ
- Việt Bắc Autonomous Region (Khu tự trị Việt Bắc), established in 1956.
  - Cao Bằng
  - Lạng Sơn
  - Thái Nguyên
  - Bắc Cạn
  - Hà Giang
  - Tuyên Quang
- Lào-Hà-Yên Autonomous Region (Khu tự trị Lào-Hà-Yên), established in 1957.

== Foreign relations ==
Countries (red) that recognized Democratic Republic of Vietnam (green) as of 1/8/1954.

Countries (red) that recognized Democratic Republic of Vietnam (green) as of 30/4/1975.

Countries (red) that recognized Democratic Republic of Vietnam (green) as of 2/7/1976.

North Vietnam was recognized by almost all Communist countries, such as the Soviet Union and other Socialist countries of Eastern Europe and Central Asia, China, North Korea, and Cuba, and received aid from these nations. North Vietnam refused to establish diplomatic relations with Yugoslavia from 1950 to 1957, perhaps reflecting Hanoi's deference to the Soviet line on the Yugoslav government of Josip Broz Tito, and North Vietnamese officials continued to be critical of Tito after relations were established.

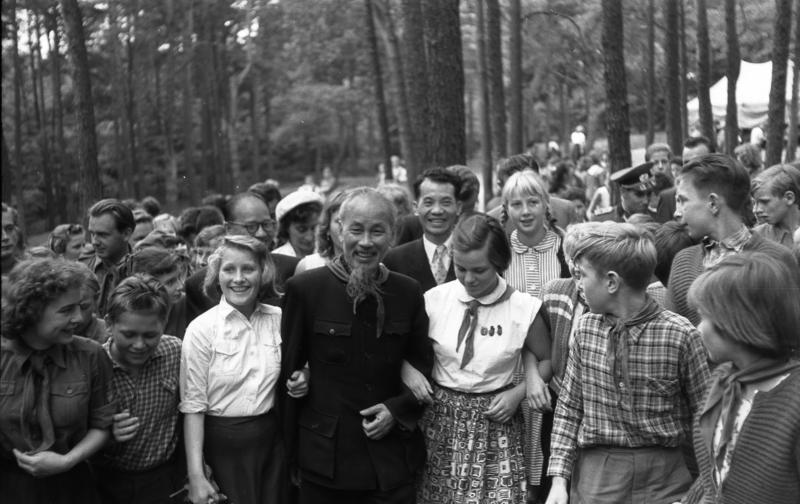
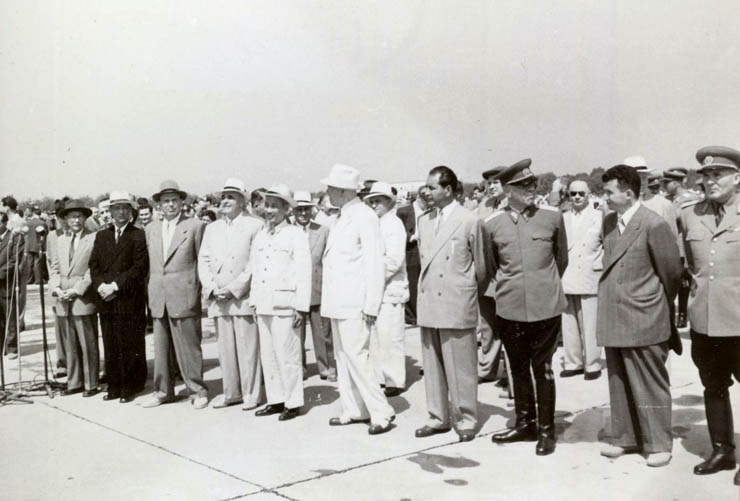

Several non-aligned countries also recognized North Vietnam. Similar to India, most accorded North Vietnam de facto rather than de jure (formal) recognition. In the case of Algeria however, relations between the DRV and Algeria were much closer as a result of clandestine weapon transfers from the former to the latter during the Algerian War, with Algeria placing a draft resolution in the 1973 summit of the Non-Aligned Movement calling on its members to support the DRV and PRG.

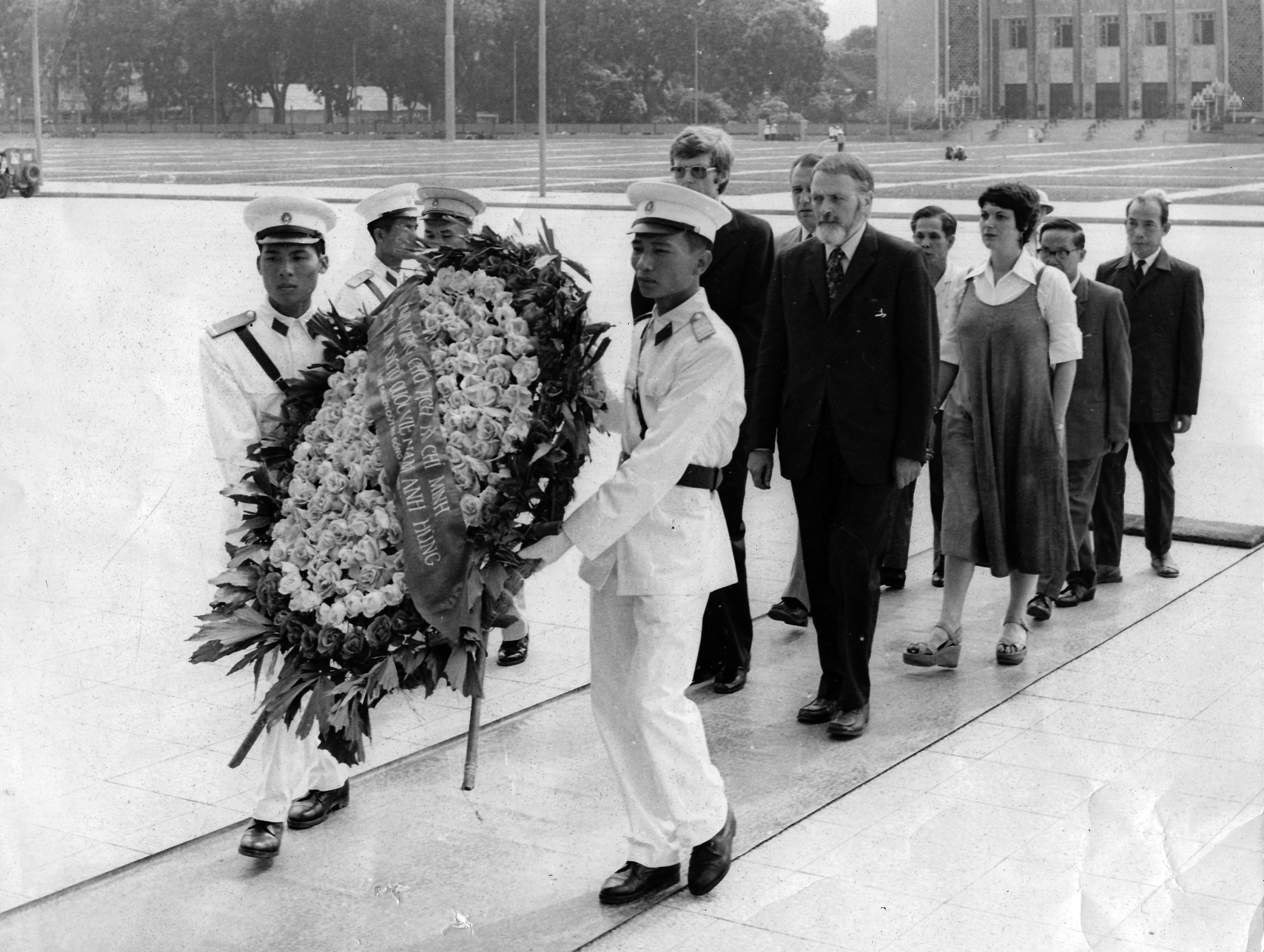

In 1969, Sweden became the first Western country to extend full diplomatic recognition to North Vietnam. Many other Western countries followed suit in the 1970s, such as the government of Australia under Gough Whitlam. By December 1972, 49 countries had established diplomatic relations with North Vietnam, and in 1973 more countries such as France established or reestablished their relations with the DRV.

=== List of countries with official diplomatic relations ===
This is the list of sovereign countries and states that recognized and established official relations with the Democratic Republic of Vietnam during its existence from 2/9/1945 to 2/7/1976. This list excludes the foreign relations of the National Liberation Front and the Provisional Revolutionary Government of the Republic of South Vietnam. It also does not count unrecognized or self-claimed countries and states. Many countries in the list below have actually established informal (de facto) relations with the DRV for a period of time before the official recognitions.

Period	Asia	Europe	Americas	Africa	Oceania	Total
Before the end of the First Indochina War (1/8/1954)	China: 18/1/1950; North Korea: 31/1/1950	Soviet Union (now Russia): 30/1/1950; Czechoslovakia (now the Czech Republic and Slovakia): 2/2/1950; East Germany (later reunified with West Germany): 3/2/1950; Hungary: 3/2/1950; Romania: 3/2/1950; Poland: 4/2/1950; Bulgaria: 8/2/1950; Albania: 11/2/1950	None	None	None	10
Before the end of the Vietnam War (30/4/1975)	Mongolia: 17/11/1954; Indonesia: 30/12/1955; Laos: 5/9/1962; North Yemen (now Yemen): 16/10/1963; Syria: 21/7/1966; Cambodia: 24/6/1967 (disrupted 25/3/1970-17/4/1974) Iraq: 10/7/1968; South Yemen (now Yemen): 27/7/1968; Ceylon (now Sri Lanka): 21/7/1970; India: 7/1/1972; Pakistan: 8/11/1972; Bangladesh: 11/2/1973; Malaysia: 30/3/1973; Singapore: 1/8/1973; Iran: 4/8/1973; Japan: 21/9/1973; Afghanistan: 16/9/1974	Yugoslavia (now Serbia): 10/3/1957; Sweden: 11/1/1969; Switzerland: 11/10/1971; Denmark: 25/11/1971; Norway: 25/11/1971; Austria: 11/12/1972; Finland: 25/1/1973; Belgium: 22/3/1973; Italy: 23/3/1973; Netherlands: 9/4/1973; France: 12/4/1973; Iceland: 3/8/1973; Britain: 1/9/1973; Luxembourg: 15/11/1973; Malta: 14/1/1974; Greece: 15/4/1975	Cuba: 2/12/1960; Chile: 25/3/1971; Canada: 21/8/1973; Argentina: 25/10/1973; Guyana: 19/4/1975	Guinea: 9/10/1958; Mali: 30/10/1960; Morocco: 27/3/1962; DR Congo: 13/4/1961; Algeria: 28/10/1962; United Arab Republic (now Egypt): 1/9/1963; R Congo: 16/7/1964; Tanzania: 14/2/1965; Mauritania: 15/3/1965; Ghana: 25/3/1965; Sudan: 26/8/1969; Senegal: 29/12/1969; Somalia: 7/6/1970; Cameroon: 30/8/1972; Equatorial Guinea: 1/9/1972; Zambia: 13/9/1972; Tunisia: 15/12/1972; Malagasy (now Madagascar): 19/12/1972; Uganda: 9/2/1973; Dahomey (now Benin): 14/3/1973; Guinea-Bissau: 30/9/1973; Gambia: 30/10/1973; Upper Volta (now Burkina Faso): 16/11/1973; Gabon: 9/1/1975; Togo: 8/2/1975; Niger: 7/3/1975; Libya: 15/3/1975; Burundi: 16/4/1975	Australia: 26/2/1973	67
Before the formal reunification with the Republic of South Vietnam (2/7/1976)	Nepal: 15/5/1975; Burma (now Myanmar): 28/5/1975; Maldives: 18/6/1975; Kuwait: 10/1/1976	Portugal: 4/7/1975; West Germany (now Germany): 23/9/1975; Cyprus: 29/11/1975	Mexico: 19/5/1975; Panama: 28/8/1975; Jamaica: 5/1/1976; Costa Rica: 24/4/1976	Mozambique: 25/6/1975; Cape Verde: 8/7/1975; Rwanda: 30/9/1975; Ivory Coast: 6/10/1975; Angola: 12/11/1975; Ethiopia: 23/2/1976; Nigeria: 25/5/1976	New Zealand: 19/6/1975	19
Total	23	27	9	35	2	96

A total of 96 countries have recognized and established formal relations with the DRV. Of those, China is the first country and also the first in Asia to recognize the DRV; Indonesia is the first neutral country and also the first in Southeast Asia; Soviet Union is the first in Europe; Cuba is the first in Americas; Guinea is the first in Africa; and Australia is the first in Oceania.

In the West, Sweden is the first Western country to recognize the DRV; Denmark is the first in NATO. In terms of allied countries which contributed troops to support France during the First Indochina War, Kingdom of Laos is the first country to recognize the DRV; and amongst countries which sent troops to support the United States during the Vietnam War, Australia is the first country.

=== Relations with foreign political organizations and unrecognized governments ===
The Viet Minh, Communist Party of Vietnam and Democratic Republic of Vietnam had good relations with many political fronts and communist parties around the world. Some notable organizations are:

- Pathet Lao (1950-1975): successor of Lao Issara; active during First Indochina War, Vietnam War and Laotian Civil War; defeated Kingdom of Laos and founded today Lao People's Democratic Republic in 1975
- United Issarak Front (1950-1954): successor of Khmer Issarak; active during First Indochina War; opposing to Kingdom of Cambodia; later a faction supported and formed Khmer Rouge
- Khmer Rouge (1963-1975): active during Vietnam War and Cambodian Civil War; defeated Khmer Republic and founded Democratic Kampuchea in 1975; however relations with the unified Vietnam quickly deteriorated
- GRUNK (1970-1976): Cambodian government in exile led by king Norodom Sihanouk after the coup which established the Khmer Republic in 1970; this was a wide front consisting of Sihanouk's loyalists, monarchists and communist Khmer Rouge; later purged and disbanded by the Democratic Kampuchea
- Palestine Liberation Organization (1964-now): PLO established de facto relations with the DRV in 1968; when the State of Palestine was founded in 1988, Vietnam officially recognized and established diplomatic relations

=== South Vietnam ===
From 1960, the North Vietnamese government went to war with the Republic of Vietnam via its proxy the Viet Cong, in an attempt to annex South Vietnam and reunify Vietnam under a communist party. North Vietnamese and Viet Cong forces and supplies were sent along the Ho Chi Minh trail. In 1964 the United States sent combat troops to South Vietnam to support the South Vietnamese government, but the U.S. had advisors there since 1950. Other nations, including Australia, the Republic of Korea, Thailand and New Zealand also contributed troops and military aid to South Vietnam's war effort. China, DPRK and the Soviet Union provided aid to and troops in support of North Vietnamese military activities. This was known as the Vietnam War, or the American War in Vietnam itself (1955–75). In addition to the Viet Cong in South Vietnam, other communist insurgencies also operated within neighboring Kingdom of Laos and Khmer Republic, both formerly part of the French colonial territory of Indochina. These were the Pathet Lao and the Khmer Rouge, respectively. These insurgencies were aided by the North Vietnamese government, which sent troops to fight alongside them.

=== Japan ===
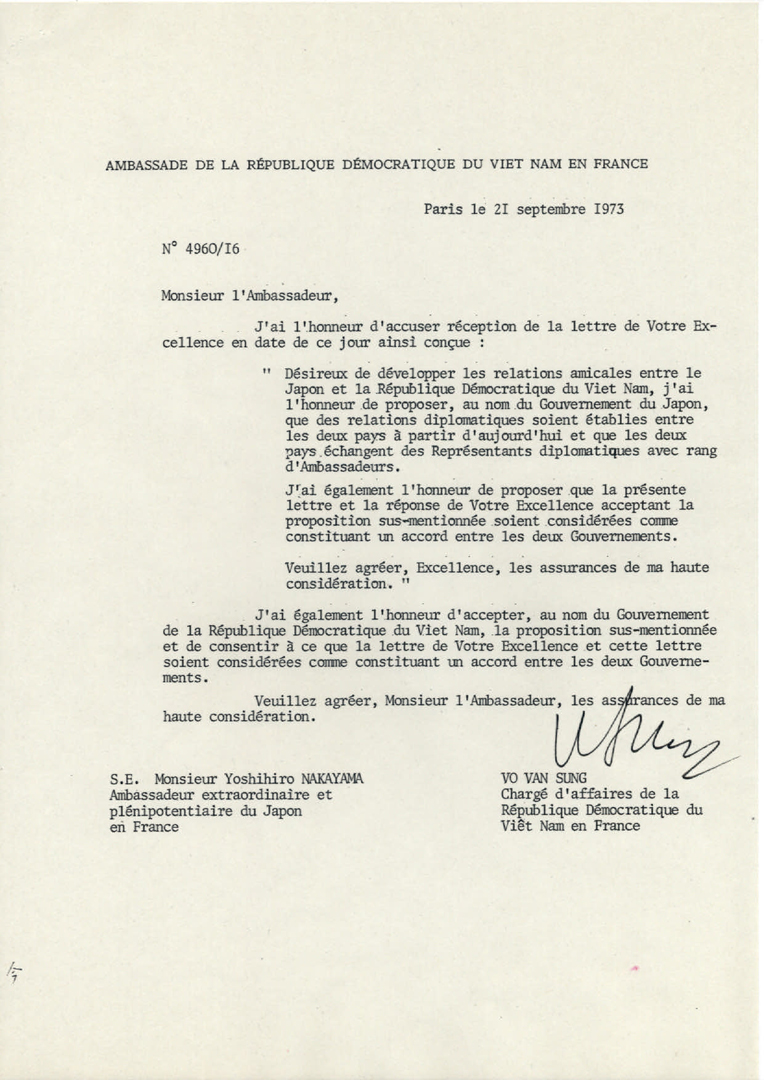
The document establishing official bilateral relations between Japan and North Vietnam signed in Paris, France, on 21 September 1973.

Despite there not being any official diplomatic ties between Japan and North Vietnam between 1954 and 1973, private exchanges were gradually being rebuilt. In March 1955 the Japanese Japan–Vietnam Friendship Association was created and in August of that year the Japan–Vietnam Trade Association was established. Meanwhile, in 1965 North Vietnamese Vietnam–Japan Friendship Association would be established to help maintain unofficial relations between the two countries.

During the Vietnam War of the 1960s and 1970s, Japan consistently encouraged a negotiated settlement at the earliest possible date. Even before the hostilities ended, it had made contact with the Democratic Republic of Vietnam (North Vietnam) government and had reached an agreement to establish diplomatic relations in September 1973. On 21 September 1973, Japan and the Democratic Republic of Vietnam (North Vietnam) signed the "Exchange of Notes Concerning the Establishment of Diplomatic Relations Between Japan and the Democratic Republic of Vietnam" in Paris, this document was in the French language and restored the diplomatic relations between Japan and North Vietnam. On the Japanese side the document was signed by Yoshihiro Nakayama, the Japanese Ambassador to France, while for the North Vietnamese side the document was signed by the Charge d'Affaires ad interim of North Vietnam to France Võ Văn Sung. Implementation, however, was delayed by North Vietnamese demands that Japan pay the equivalent of US$45 million in World War II reparations in two yearly installments, in the form of "economic cooperation" grants. Giving in to the Vietnamese demands, Japan paid the money and opened an embassy in Hanoi on 11 October 1975, following the unification of North Vietnam and South Vietnam into the Socialist Republic of Vietnam.

Earlier, the Japanese already gave similar funding to the South Vietnamese, which also re-established official diplomatic relations with Japan during the same period.

With the re-establishment of relations between Japan and North Vietnam the Japanese agreed to resolve what are termed "unsolved problems", which after earlier negotiations in Vientiane, Kingdom of Laos, these "unsolved problems" revolved around grants given by the Japanese State to North Vietnam. Between 1973 and 1975 the Japanese and North Vietnamese governments held over 20 both official and unofficial meetings, on 6 October 1975 both sides finally reached and agreement and the Japanese would provide the North Vietnamese with an endowment worth 13.5 billion yen. Of this money, 8.5 billion yen would be used to purchase heavy farmland cultivation machinery as well as public works provided by Japanese-owned corporations.

After diplomatic relations were re-established, in 1975, Japan would open an embassy in Hanoi and North Vietnam would open an embassy in Tokyo.

== Economy ==
=== Land reform ===
Land reform was an integral part of the Viet Minh and communist Democratic Republic of Vietnam. A Viet Minh Land Reform Law of 4 December 1953 called for (1) confiscation of land belonging to landlords who were enemies of the regime; (2) requisition of land from landlords not judged to be enemies; and (3) purchase with payment in bonds. The land reform was carried out from 1953 to 1956. Some farming areas did not undergo land reform but only rent reduction and the highland areas occupied by minority peoples were not substantially impacted. Some land was retained by the government but most was distributed without payment with priority given to Viet Minh fighters and their families. The total number of rural people impacted by the land reform program was more than 4 million. The rent reduction program impacted nearly 8 million people.

==== Results ====
The land reform program was a success in terms of distributing much land to poor and landless peasants and reducing or eliminating the land holdings of landlords (địa chủ) and rich peasants. By 1960, there were 40,000 cooperatives spanning nearly nine-tenths of all farmland. The program, proceeded by a Three Year Plan (1957–1960), lifted agricultural production to 5.4 million tonnes or over double pre-Indochina War levels.

However, it was carried out with violence and repression primarily directed against large landowners identified, sometimes incorrectly, as landlords. Executions and imprisonment of persons classified as "reactionary and evil landlords" were contemplated from the beginning of the land reform program. A Politburo document dated 4 May 1953 said that the planned executions were "fixed in principle at the ratio of one per one thousand people of the total population".

The number of persons actually executed by cadre carrying out the land reform program has been variously estimated, with some ranging up to 200,000. However, other scholarship has concluded that the higher estimates were based on political propaganda which also emanated from South Vietnam with the support of the US, and that the actual total of those executed was significantly lower. Gareth Porter estimated that between 800 and 2,500 people were executed, citing a South Vietnamese government document released in 1959, that Porter says is consistent with an estimate of around 1,500 executions. In 2007, scholar Balasz Szalontai wrote that documents of Hungarian diplomats living in North Vietnam at the time of the land reform provided a number of the 62,182 'landlords' identified by the land reform cadres, of whom 1,337 were executed by December 1955, including 1,175 executions during the first stage, which was the rent-reduction campaign, and 162 executions during the second stage, which was the land reform proper. The third stage in early 1956, likely resulted in more deaths than the previous stages as the repression was more intense. Szalontai writes that these documents support estimates by scholar Edwin E. Moise, who concluded that "the total number of people executed was probably on the rough order of 5,000 and almost certainly between 3,000 and 15,000". Moise later came up with a revised estimate of 13,500 including people who committed suicide following arrest. Economist Vo Nhan Tri reported uncovering a document in the central party archives which put the number of wrongful executions at 15,000. From discussions with party cadres, Vo Nhan Tri concluded that the overall number of deaths was considerably higher than this figure.

In early 1956, North Vietnam initiated a "correction of errors" which put an end to the land reform, and to rectify the mistakes and damage done. On 18 August 1956, North Vietnamese leader Ho Chi Minh apologised and acknowledged the serious errors the government had made in the land reform. Too many farmers, he also said, had been incorrectly classified as "landlords" and executed or imprisoned and too many mistakes has been made in the process of redistributing land. Severe rioting protesting the excesses of the land reform broke out in November 1956 in one largely Catholic rural district, leading to 1,000 deaths or injuries, and several thousand imprisoned. As part of the correction campaign, as many as 23,748 political prisoners were released by North Vietnam by September 1957. By 1958, the correction campaign had resulted in the return of land to many of those harmed by the land reform.

Concurrently with the land reform campaign and the end of the First Indochina War, over 12,000 people died from famine in Viet-Minh controlled zones by the end of 1954 due to economic turmoil in combination with natural disasters, floods, and crop failures.

==== Collective farming ====
The ultimate objective of the land reform program of the Democratic Republic of Vietnam government was not to achieve equitable distribution of farmland but rather the organization of all farmers into co-operatives in which land and other factors of agricultural production would be owned and used collectively. The first steps after the 1953–1956 land reform were the encouragement by the government of labor exchanges in which farmers would unite to exchange labor; secondly in 1958 and 1959 was the formation of "low level cooperatives" in which farmers cooperated in production. By 1961, 86 percent of farmers were members of low-level cooperatives. The third step beginning in 1961 was to organize "high level cooperatives", true collective farming in which land and resources were utilized collectively without individual ownership of land. By 1971, the great majority of farmers in North Vietnam were organized into high-level cooperatives. After the reunification of Vietnam, collective farms were abandoned gradually in the 1980s and 1990s.

== See also ==
- Captive Nations
- Viet Minh

== Bibliography ==
- Asselin, Pierre (2013). Hanoi's Road to the Vietnam War, 1954–1965. University of California Press. ISBN 9780520956551.
- Asselin, Pierre (2024). Vietnam's American War: A New History. Cambridge University Press. ISBN 9781009229302.
- Holcombe, Alec (2020). Mass Mobilization in the Democratic Republic of Vietnam, 1945–1960. University of Hawaiʻi Press. doi:10.2307/j.ctv105bb0z. ISBN 9780824884475. JSTOR j.ctv105bb0z.
- Marr, David G. (2013). Vietnam: State, War, and Revolution (1945–1946). University of California Press. ISBN 9780520954977.
- Nguyen, Lien-Hang T. (2012). Hanoi's War: An International History of the War for Peace in Vietnam. University of North Carolina Press. ISBN 9780807882696.

Preceded by Empire of Vietnam	Democratic Republic of Vietnam; 1945–1976	Succeeded by Socialist Republic of Vietnam
