= Socialist Party of Vietnam =

Political party (1946–1988)

- Vietnamese name: Đảng Xã hội Việt Nam
- Secretary-General: Phan Tư Nghĩa; Nguyễn Xiển; Hoàng Minh Giám
- Founded: 22 July 1946 (80 years, 38 days)
- Dissolved: 22 July 1988 (38 years, 38 days)
- Headquarters: Hanoi
- Ideology: Socialism; Vietnamese nationalism
- Political position: Left-wing
- National affiliation: Vietnamese Fatherland Front

Party flag

The Socialist Party of Vietnam (Vietnamese: Đảng Xã hội Việt Nam) was a political party in Vietnam which existed from 1946 to 1988. It was founded with the official aim of uniting "patriotic intelligentsia". The Socialist Party, together with the Democratic Party, was one of two bloc parties in the North Vietnamese government, which was controlled by the Communist Party. Key leaders of the party included Nguyễn Xiển, who served as its deputy secretary from 1946 to 1956 and as its secretary from 1956 until the party's dissolution in 1988; and Hoàng Minh Giám, who served as the party's deputy secretary from 1956 to 1988 and as North Vietnam's foreign minister.
