= Vietnam Revolutionary League =

Vietnam Revolutionary League Việt Nam Cách mệnh Đồng minh Hội
- Abbreviation: Việt Cách
- Leader: Nguyễn Hải Thần
- Chairperson: Nguyễn Hải Thần (1942–1943, 1944–1946); Hồ Chí Minh (1943–1944)
- Members of the Central Committee: Trần Báo; Trương Bội Công; Trương Trung Phụng; Nông Kinh Du; Nghiêm Kế Tổ; Vũ Hồng Khanh (until 1944)
- Founded: 10 October 1942
- Dissolved: June 1946 (de facto)
- Headquarters: Liuzhou (1942–1945); Hanoi (1945–1946)
- Newspaper: Đồng Minh
- Paramilitary wing: Action Brigades
- Membership (1946): ~5,000
- Ideology: Anti-imperialism; Vietnamese nationalism Three Principles of the People
- Post-1946 fracture: Việt Minh (communist-controlled faction, 1946–1951); National Union Front (anti-communist faction, 1947–1949)

Party flag

The Vietnam Revolutionary League (Vietnamese: Việt Nam Cách mệnh Đồng minh Hội), abbreviated as the Việt Cách or Đồng minh Hội, was a Vietnamese nationalist political organization that existed during World War II.

The Vietnam Revolutionary League was a pro-Republic of China coalition consisting of a number of allied political groups active in Vietnam but based out of China. Following Japan's surrender, the Việt Cách followed the Chinese National Revolutionary Army into North Vietnam as part of the Allied occupation forces.

Before the Việt Cách was established, China-based Vietnamese revolutionary groups had previously attempted to unite into a larger organization. According to Neil L. Jamieson's book, Understanding Vietnam, communists, the Việt Quốc, and several other groups jointly established bases in Jingxi, Guangxi starting in 1940. Khái Hưng and Hoàng Đạo traveled to China as members of the Great Annam Democratic Party (ĐVDCĐ), after which the Việt Quốc moved to Kunming and published anti-Japanese newspapers alongside the communist organization there. When Japan advanced into Indochina, the Việt Quốc established the Vietnam Liberation League (Vietnamese: Việt Nam giải phóng hội), comprising itself alongside the ĐVDCĐ, the Đại Việt Nationalist Party, the League for the National Restoration of Vietnam (also known as the Phục quốc Hội), the Việt Minh, and other smaller parties. The Vietnam Liberation League was led by Nguyễn Hải Thần, and counted among its members a number of future communist notables, including Phạm Văn Đồng, Võ Nguyên Giáp, and Hoàng Văn Hoan. In 1942, the organization relocated to Liuzhou, where a number of its constituent parties formed the Vietnam Revolutionary League. The founding congress of the Việt Cách opened on October 1, 1942, and featured delegates from various non-communist Vietnamese nationalist groups, most notably the Việt Quốc and the Phục quốc Hội, under the auspices of Kuomintang general Zhang Fakui. The congress elected a seven-member Central Committee, consisting of:

1. Trương Bội Công
2. Nguyễn Hải Thần
3. Vũ Hồng Khanh
4. Nghiêm Kế Tổ
5. Nông Kinh Du
6. Trần Báo
7. Trương Trung Phụng

The standing Committee members were Trương Bội Công, Nguyễn Hải Thần, and Vũ Hồng Khanh, but Vũ Hồng Khanh and Nghiêm Kế Tổ were the most powerful members of the Committee due to their Kuomintang backing. However, in 1943 Zhang Fakui entrusted Hồ Chí Minh with leadership of the Việt Cách. According to Robert Shaplen's book, The Lost Revolution: "And it was from this time that Nguyen Ai Quoc changed his name to Ho Chi Minh, primarily to conceal his identity from Dai Li, Chiang's secret police chief. With the name of Ho Chi Minh, he became the leader of a broad organization of Vietnamese revolutionary groups called the Vietnam Revolutionary League, which was supported by the Chinese Kuomintang, and the communist-led Viet Minh was originally only a part of this organization." In March 1944, Nguyễn Hải Thần chaired the Conference of Overseas Revolutionary Groups of the Vietnam Revolutionary League, establishing an administrative committee which included three delegates from the Indochinese Communist Party: Lê Tùng Sơn, Phạm Văn Đồng, and Hồ Chí Minh. But in mid-1944, Hồ Chí Minh returned to Vietnam, and Vũ Hồng Khanh clashed with Nguyễn Hải Thần and Nhất Linh. This alliance thus dissolved, and Nguyễn Hải Thần continued to lead the Việt Cách.
