= Vietnam Human Rights Network =

- Founded: September 1997 in California, USA
- Type: Non-profit; NGO
- Location(s): Global Headquarter in California, USA
- Services: Advocating and defending human rights
- Key people: Trinh Mau Nguyen, PharmD; Chairman of the Board; Tung Ba Nguyen, DPA; Executive Director
- Website: www.vietnamhumanrights.net

The Vietnam Human Rights Network' (VNHRN) (Mạng Lưới Nhân Quyền Việt Nam in Vietnamese) is a non-profit NGO founded in 1997 committed to the defense and promotion of human rights and civil liberties in Vietnam. The Network focuses its operations on the rights set forth by the Universal Declaration of Human Rights and subsequent international human rights instruments. Members of the VNHRN are present in many countries worldwide, and its headquarters are in Orange County, California, U.S.A.

== Formation ==
Toward the end of the 1990s, the increasing repression of dissidents by the Vietnamese authorities at home and the collapse of many communist dictatorial regimes in Eastern Europe, encouraged many Vietnamese human rights activists worldwide to come together for collective actions. A founding convention was held in Santa Ana, California on November 1, 1997, gathering a consortium of activists representing various human rights organizations worldwide; the Vietnam Human Rights Network was founded a few days later.

As of 2025, the VNHRN has held seventeen Conventions gathering participants from many countries to go over past operations, assess the human rights situations in Vietnam and the world, and layout the general directions and future activities.

== Organization ==
As a network, participating organizations are entirely equal in their standing and votes. The only condition is that they work together on joint projects while retaining their identity as individual organizations with their activities. For coordination purposes, VNHRN consists of three central bodies: the Board of Directors, the Executive Committee, and the Advisory Board.

== The Vietnam Human Rights Awards ==
Since 2002, the Vietnam Human Rights Network has presented annual Awards to selected human rights activists and organizations in Vietnam who have made their mark in the inexorable march towards freedom, human rights, and democracy of the Vietnamese people. It is also an opportunity for Vietnamese people in the Diaspora to express their solidarity with and support those involved in the relentless fighting for fundamental rights and justice for Vietnamese people. The prize-awarding ceremony was held every year in different locations worldwide on International Human Rights Day (December 10). After over two decades of existence, the Vietnam Human Rights Awards have received positive marks from both inside and outside of Vietnam, despite sharp criticism by the Vietnamese authorities.

List of VNHRA Recipients

2002	Most Venerable Thích Quảng Độ and Father Nguyễn Văn Lý
2003	Messrs Nguyen Vu Binh, Le Chi Quang, Nguyen Khac Toan, and Dr. Phạm Hồng Sơn
2004	Mr. Pham Que Duong and Dr. Nguyễn Đan Quế
2005	Mr. Le Quang Liem, Father Phan Van Loi, and Venerable Thich Tue Sy
2006	Mr. Do Nam Hai an Mr. Nguyen Chinh Ket
2007	Mr. Hoàng Minh Chính, Lawyer Nguyễn Văn Đài, and Lawyer Le Thi Cong Nhan
2008	Venerable Thich Thien Minh, Blogger Diếu Cày Nguyễn Văn Hải, and Tu Do Ngon Luan Magazine
2009	Pastor Nguyen cong Chinh and Writer Tran Khai Thanh Thuy
2010	Journalist Truong Minh Duc and Mr. Đoàn Huy Chương
2011	Dr. Cù Huy Hà Vũ and Ms. Do Thi Minh Hanh
2012	Ms. Pham Thanh Nghien, Blogger Tạ Phong Tần, and Ms. Huynh Thuc Vy
2013	Messrs Trần Huỳnh Duy Thức, Nguyen Hoang Quoc Hung, and Lawyer Le Quoc Quan
2014	Vietnam Redemptorist Province, Mr. Nguyen Bac Truyen, and Musicians Viet Khang and Tran Vu Anh Binh
2015	Most Venerable Thích Không Tánh, Ms. Ho Thi Bich Khuong, and Ms. Bui Thi Minh Hang
2016	The Vietnamese Bloggers' Network, Lawyer Vo An Don, Ms. Tran Ngoc Anh, and Ms. Can Thi Theu
2017	The Brotherhood for Democracy, Blogger Ba Sàm Nguyễn Hữu Vinh, Blogger Nguyen Ngoc Nhu Quynh, and Pastor Y Yích
2018	Mr. Hoang Duc Binh, Ms. Tran Thi Nga, and Blogger Pham Doan Trang
2019	Pastor Nguyen Trung Ton, Activist Nguyen Dang Minh Man, and Lawyer Le Cong Dinh
2020	Activist Nguyen Nang Tinh, Activist Nguyen Van Hoa, and The Independent Journalists Association of Vietnam (IJAVN)
2021	Mrs. Can Thi Theu's family, including her two sons Trinh Ba Phuong and Tinh Ba Tu and herself; environmental activist Đinh Thị Thu Thủy; and Mr. Nguyen Van Tuc
2022	Poet Tran Duc Thach, Journalist Nguyen Tuong Thuy, Activist Luu Van Vinh and the Vietnam National Self-Determination Coalition
2023	Activists Trần Văn Bang, Y Wô Nie, and Lê Trọng Hùng
2024	Activists Bui Van Thuan, Dang Dang Phuoc, and Do Nam Trung
2025	Activists Phan Tat Thanh, Nguyen Thi Ngoc Hanh, and Nguyen Chi Tuyen

== Annual Report of the VNHRN ==
The Vietnam Human Rights Network has published its annual reports on Human Rights in Vietnam as of 2009.

== Award ==
On May 27, 2018, The Visual Artists Guild presented the Vietnam Human Rights Network with the Spirit of Tiananmen Award for its human rights activities over the past two decades on the 28th anniversary of the Tiananmen Square protests and massacre.

== Criticism ==
The existence and activities of VNHRN have drawn fierce criticism from the Vietnamese authorities as "a reactionary organization of Vietnamese in exile... hiding behind the shield of 'democracy and human rights' to oppose the Vietnamese government through slander and distortions."
