= Vĩnh Hưng =

Vĩnh Hưng may refer to several places in Vietnam, including:

- Vĩnh Hưng District, a rural district of Long An Province
- Vĩnh Hưng, Hanoi, a ward of Hoàng Mai District
- Vĩnh Hưng (township), a township and capital of Vĩnh Hưng District
- Vĩnh Hưng, Bạc Liêu, a commune of Vĩnh Lợi District
- Vĩnh Hưng, Thanh Hóa, a commune of Vĩnh Lộc District

== See also ==
- Vĩnh Hưng A, a commune of Vĩnh Lợi District in Bạc Liêu Province
- Vinh Hưng, a commune of Phú Lộc District in Thừa Thiên-Huế Province
- Vĩnh Hùng, a commune of Vĩnh Lộc District in Thanh Hóa Province
