= Cù Huy Hà Vũ =

Vietnamese lawyer

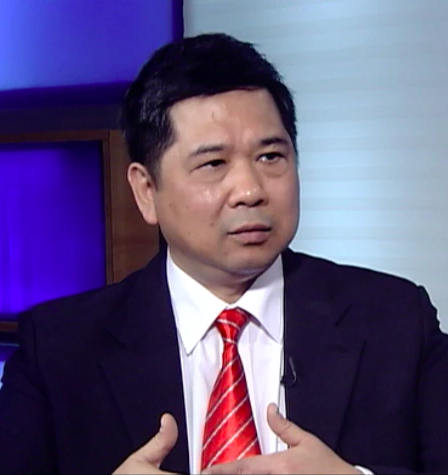
- Born: 2 December 1957 (age 68); Ân Phú, Vũ Quang, Hà Tĩnh, North Vietnam (now Vietnam)
- Citizenship: Vietnamese, American
- Education: University of Paris
- Occupation: Lawyer
- Known for: Activist and dissident
- Spouse: Nguyen Thi Duong Ha
- Parent(s): Ngo Thi Xuan Nhu (mother); Cù Huy Cận (father)

Cù Huy Hà Vũ is a Vietnamese legal scholar. A government critic and a dissident, he was taken into custody in 2010 on charges of "propaganda against the state" and "plotting to overthrow the communist government of Vietnam". On 4 April 2011, Vũ was sentenced to 7 years in prison for "spreading anti-state propaganda", drawing protests from human rights groups, the Catholic Church, and the international community.

On 6 April 2014, Vũ was released from prison and taken to Noi Bai International Airport to be flown to Dulles International Airport, along with his wife.

== Background ==
He is a son of poet Cù Huy Cận, who gained his political position in Vietnam thanks to being a companion of Ho Chi Minh during the Indochina War and Vietnam War. Cu Huy Cận went on to serve in Vietnam's first National Assembly. Vũ's mother, Ngo Thi Xuan Nhu, was the sister of the poet Xuân Diệu.

Vũ graduated with a doctorate in law from France's University of Paris, though he did not become a licensed lawyer in Vietnam. Vũ's wife Nguyen Thi Duong Ha is also a lawyer, and together they run a law firm in Hanoi. In 2006, Vũ made an unsuccessful bid to become the country's Minister of Culture.

== Activism ==
Vũ attempted to sue Prime Minister Nguyễn Tấn Dũng on several occasions. In June 2009, he achieved national fame by filing a suit against Dung for granting a Chinese mining company rights to a bauxite deposit. The suit was dismissed by the court. In September and October 2010, Vũ filed suits against Dũng for signing Decision No. 136, a measure that banned citizens from filing lawsuits or complaints against the national government.

Vũ also called in interviews for the revision of Article 4 of the Constitution of Vietnam, which states that the Communist Party is the only legal political party. Vũ stated that he wished for Vietnam to adopt democratic reforms and a multiparty system of government.

In October 2010, Vũ's law firm began the defense of Catholics of Con Dau parish in Da Nang, after police arrested members of the parish for a funeral procession in a disputed area. However, the firm was denied permission to represent the defendants by the Cam Le district People's Court.

== Trial ==
On 5 November 2010, Vũ was arrested at a hotel in Ho Chi Minh City; police claim to have arrested him when he was with a woman who was not his wife, and briefly posted photos of a half-dressed Vũ with a blurred woman to an official website. Vũ's home and law office were subsequently searched. Officials later stated Vũ had "produced documents that opposed the State of Vietnam, employed propagandistic rhetoric as a form of a psychological warfare, demanded the overthrow of the regime and the realization of pluralism and a multiparty system, opposed the interest of the nation, and called for foreign intervention."

On 4 April 2011, Vũ was tried on an indictment accusing him of disseminating anti-state propaganda via the Internet, interviews with international media, and other writings. The trial lasted half a day, during which Vũ's lawyers walked out after a judge rejected their requests to make public the interviews which Vũ was accused of giving. Foreign media was banned from the courtroom, though some reporters were allowed to watch the proceedings via closed-circuit television. Vũ stated to the court that "This criminal case was invented against me. This case is completely illegal." In sentencing Vũ, the judge stated that "Cu Huy Ha Vũ's behaviour is serious and harmful to society. His writings and interviews blackened directly or indirectly the Communist Party of Vietnam". Vũ was sentenced to seven years' imprisonment. Democracy activists Phạm Hồng Sơn and Lê Quốc Quân were arrested attempting to observe the trial and charged with "causing public disorder". Son's wife Vũ Thu Ha stated that Son had been assaulted by police with batons prior to his arrest.

The U.S. criticized the sentence, with the U.S. State Department saying that the "apparent lack of due process" at Vũ's trial was troubling. Amnesty International declared him a prisoner of conscience and urged his immediate release. Catholic churches held prayer vigils for Vũ in recognition of his work defending the rights of the country's Catholics. Human Rights Watch described the trial as "one of the most important cases involving a political dissident in the recent history of the Socialist Republic of Vietnam". The organization stated that Vũ was being "tried for his political bravery in peacefully challenging abuses of power, defending victims of land confiscation, and protecting the environment ... The government makes a mockery of its international human rights obligations when it persecutes activists like Dr. Vũ who try to use the legal system to demand official accountability and rule of law". Reporters Without Borders "deplored" the verdict, stating, "We call on the authorities to end their harassment of dissidents, and to begin respecting free speech and the right of each citizen to freely express an opinion. Vũ must be freed without delay." The World Organisation Against Torture (OMCT) and the International Federation for Human Rights stated "their deepest concern" for Vũ in a joint statement, with OMCT saying that "This case is sadly yet another example of the ongoing repression of fundamental rights in Viet Nam, and human rights defenders in particular have borne the brunt of such repression."

The sentence was upheld by an appeals court in Hanoi on 2 August. In 2012, Vũ was a finalist for the Front Line Award for Human Rights Defenders at Risk, which ultimately went to Syrian blogger Razan Ghazzawi. The same year, he was nominated for the Ludovic-Trarieux International Human Rights Prize "The tribute of lawyers to a lawyer".

== See also ==
- Human rights in Vietnam
- Nguyễn Tiến Trung
- Lê Công Định
- Nguyễn Văn Lý
- Nguyen Dan Que
