= Châu Hưng (disambiguation) =

Châu Hưng may refer to several places in Vietnam, including:

- Châu Hưng, a commune of Vĩnh Long province
- Châu Hưng (township), a former commune-level town in Vĩnh Lợi District in Bạc Liêu Province
- Châu Hưng, Sóc Trăng, a former commune of Thạnh Trị District

== See also ==
- Châu Hưng A, a commune of Vĩnh Lợi District
