= Hưng Thành =

Hưng Thành may refer to the following places in Vietnam:

- Hưng Thành, Tuyên Quang, a ward of Tuyên Quang city
- Hưng Thành, Bạc Liêu, a commune of Vĩnh Lợi District
