= Nguyễn Văn Túc =

Vietnamese political activist

Nguyễn Văn Túc (born May 28, 1964) is a Vietnamese farmer, poet and prisoner of conscience. Tuc is known for campaigning for democracy, land rights and human rights in Vietnam. Tuc has been arrested twice by the Vietnamese authorities for exercising his rights. His recent arrest was on September 1, 2017. Tuc was charged with aiming to overthrow the state under Article 79 of the 1999 Penal Code and was sentenced to 13 years imprisonment. Previously he was sentenced to 4 years of imprisonment in 2008 for propaganda against the state under Article 88 of the Penal Code.

== Activism ==
Tuc is known for campaigning against corruption and land rights confiscations in Dong La communce, Dong Hung district, Thai Binh province. He writes about corruption and demands a multi-party system in Vietnam.

Tuc joined the 8406 Bloc (Khối 8406), a pro-democracy group founded on April 8, 2006. The group is named after the date of the group’s Manifesto on Freedom and Democracy for Vietnam 2006. Most of its members are either jailed or exiled by the government. Tuc served as deputy head in the organization.

His activism has led to being arrested twice by the Vietnamese authorities. The first arrest in September 2008 was related to the campaign in Hai Phong, where Tuc and other activists hung a banner in Hai Phong calling for democracy.

After his prior imprisonment, Tuc continued campaigning for human rights and democracy. Tuc became a member of the Brotherhood for Democracy, a pro-democracy group co-founded by lawyer and former political prisoner Nguyen Van Dai, also his peer in 8406 Bloc. Tuc’s second arrest in September 2017 was related to his membership in the Brotherhood for Democracy.

== 2017 Arrest and Sentence ==
Tuc was arrested on September 1, 2017 and had his trial only seven months later on April 10, 2018 in Thai Binh province. He was sentenced to 13 years imprisonment and 3 years of house arrest under Article 79 of the 1999 Penal Code with an expected release date on September 1, 2030. His appeal of the sentence was denied on September 14, 2018.

Tuc resumed campaigning for democracy after his first imprisonment. He joined the Brotherhood for Democracy, a pro-democracy organization with activists inside and outside of Vietnam. His involvement in the organization led him to be arrested by the Vietnamese authorities and charged with “carrying activities that aim to overthrow the people’s administration”.

Since his imprisonment in September 2017, his wife Bùi Thị Rề has publicly stated that Tuc is suffering with poor health conditions, while being denied with adequate medical treatment or supplies.

From June 10, 2019 Tuc was on a collective hunger strike with other political prisoners for protesting against the poor prison conditions. According to his wife, the prison refused to provide electric fans despite the extreme heat waves. The strike only ended on July 21, 2019 after the prisoners were finally provided with fans.

Currently Tuc is held at Prison No. 6, Thanh Chuong in Nghe An province. His wife, Bùi Thị Rề, has stated that Tuc is suffering from many serious diseases and that his health conditions have worsened.

== 2008 Arrest and Sentence ==
On September 10, 2008 Tuc was arrested and charged with conducting propaganda against the state under Article 88 of the 1999 Penal Code. One month later he was sentenced to 4 years imprisonment followed by 3 years house arrest. Tuc was held in Prison Camp K1 in Ha Nam Province.

His arrest was after he and other activists hung a banner on an overpass in Hai Phong requesting the authorities to stop corruption, to defend the fatherland and to accept pluralism and a multi-party system.

Tuc served his full term and was released from prison in September 2012.

== International Response ==
The arrest of Tuc has caught attention internationally.

In September 2017, several UN Rapporteurs released a letter about the obligations that Vietnam has to protect universal freedoms and their concern on the prisoners of conscience including Nguyen Van Tuc.

In April 2018, several UN experts released a statement demanding clarifications and urging the Vietnamese government to uphold international obligations to protect human rights and release peaceful activists.

In September 2018, Human Rights Watch called for an immediate release ahead of Tuc’s appeal trial.

In June 2019, Vietnamese civil organizations urged the Vietnamese authorities to stop torturing and maltreating their prisoners, especially in Prison Camp No. 5 and 6. The appeal has been signed by twelve organizations and more than 550 individuals.
