= Vĩnh Lợi district =

Vĩnh Lợi district Huyện Vĩnh Lợi
- District
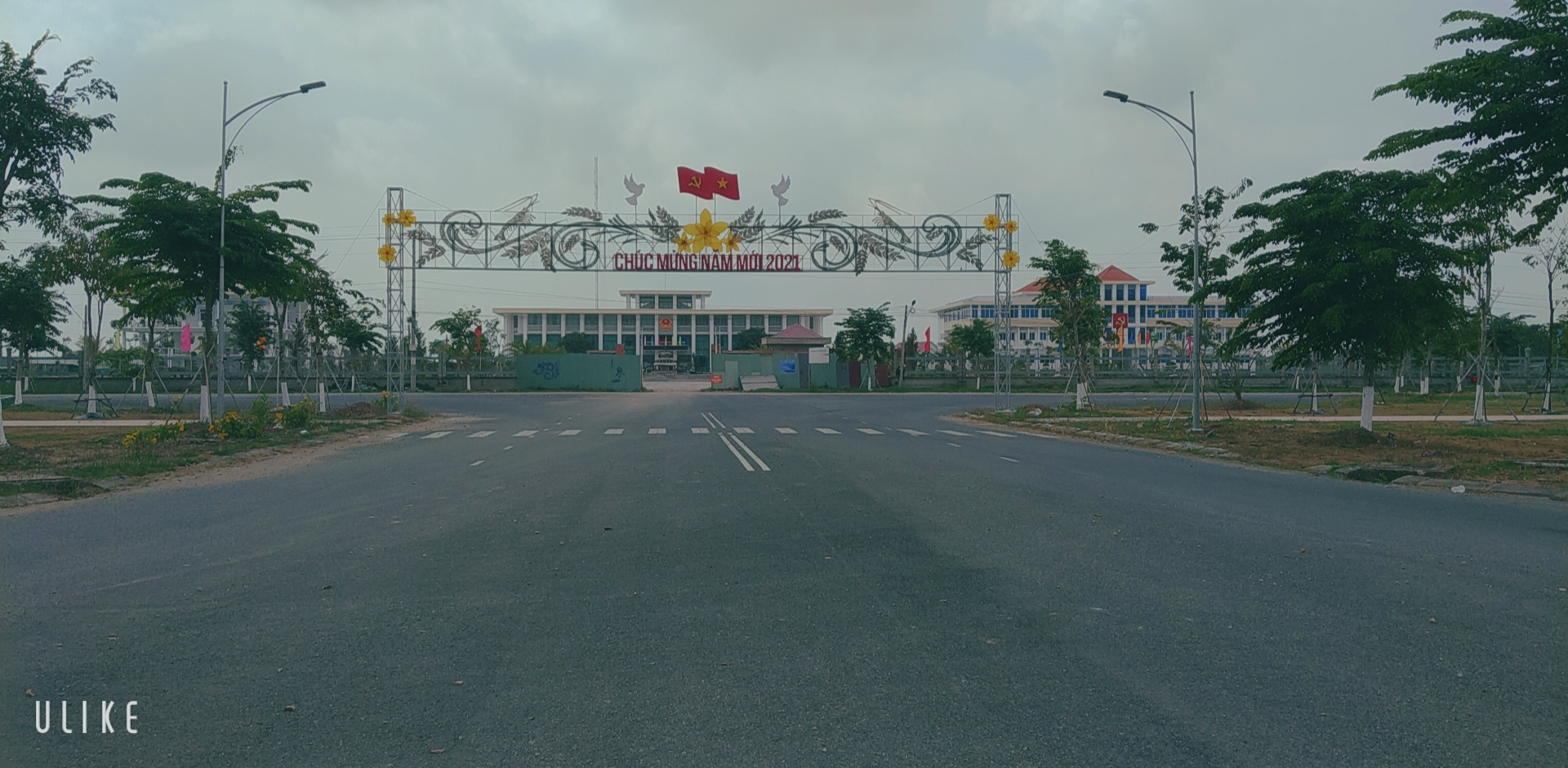

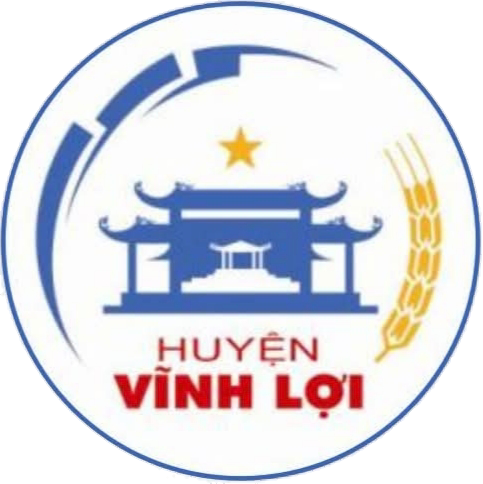
- Seal

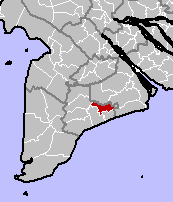
- Location in Bạc Liêu province
- Country: Vietnam
- Province: Bạc Liêu province
- Capital: Châu Hưng

Area
  - Total: 252 sq mi (652 km^{2})

Population (2003)
  - Total: 187,515
- Time zone: UTC+7 (Indochina Time)

Vĩnh Lợi was a rural district (huyện) of Bạc Liêu province (Now Cà Mau province) in the Mekong Delta region of Vietnam. As of 2003 the district had a population of 187,515. The district covered an area of 652 km^{2}. The district capital lies at Châu Hưng. Vĩnh Lợi district is north of the border with Sóc Trăng province (Now Cần Thơ), south of Hòa Bình and Bạc Liêu town, and west of Phước Long district.

== Administrative divisions ==
Vĩnh Lợi district is subdivided into 8 commune-level subdivisions, including Châu Hưng township (district capital), and the rural communes of: Châu Hưng A, Hưng Thành, Hưng Hội, Châu Thới, Vĩnh Hưng, Vĩnh Hưng A and Long Thạnh.
