= VYD =

VYD may refer to:

- Assembly of Vietnamese Youth for Democracy
- VYD, IATA airport code for Vryheid Airport, on List of airports by IATA code: V
