= Nguyễn Trung Tôn =

Vietnamese political prisoner

Nguyễn Trung Tôn (born September 2, 1971) is a Vietnamese Protestant pastor, human rights activist and prisoner of conscience. Ton is known for campaigning for democracy and freedom of religion in Vietnam. He has been arrested twice, in 2011 and 2017, for being involved in his political activism. Ton is currently imprisoned since July 30, 2017 with a sentence of 12 years in prison.

== Activism ==
Ton is known for campaigning for democracy and freedom of religion in Vietnam. He was the President of Brotherhood for Democracy, a pro-democracy group co-founded by lawyer and former political prisoner Nguyen Van Dai. His involvement in this group has led to harassment and arrests in 2011 and 2017. In the second arrest, the other members of the Brotherhood for Democracy were also imprisoned: Pham Van Troi, Nguyen Bac Truyen, Truong Minh Duc, Nguyen Van Dai, and Le Thu Ha.

=== 2011 arrest and sentence ===
On January 15, 2011 Ton was arrested and charged under Article 88 of the 1999 Penal Code for “propaganda against the state”. His trial took place on December 30, 2011 and Ton was sentenced to 2 years in prison and 2 years of house arrest. Ton was released on January 15. 2013.

=== 2017 arrest and sentence ===
Ton was arrested on July 30, 2017 and charged for “carrying out activities aimed to overthrow the people’s administration” under Article 79 of the 1999 Penal Code. He was arrested at his home in Thanh Hoa. On this same day, the other members of Brotherhood for Democracy were also arrested. On April 5, 2018 Ton received a sentence of 12 years in prison and 3 years of house arrest.

Prior to his arrest, Ton and his friend, Nguyen Viet Tu, were kidnapped by plainclothes police officers in February 2017. Both of them were brutally beaten, robbed and released in a rural area.

Ton appealed his sentence in late April 2018, however this was denied two months later in June 2018. In July 2018, Ton was transferred from B14 detention center in Hanoi to Dak Trung prison camp in Dak Lak province, which is about 1,000 km from his hometown.

According to his wife, Nguyen Thi Lanh, Ton is seriously ill, denied medical treatment and beaten up by prison authorities. In November 2017, Lanh appealed to the United Nations High Commissioner for Human Rights, Zeid Ra’ad al Hussein, to call for support, as her family was harassed and intimidated by the Vietnamese authorities in Thanh Hoa province.

Ton is expected to be released on July 30, 2029.

== Reactions ==
On February 20, 2018, the son of Ton, Nguyen Trung Trong Nghia, brought up the story of the harassment against and imprisonment of his father at the 10th Geneva Summit for Human Rights and Democracy. Nghia is also known as Effy Nguyen, a blogger who speaks up about social and political issues in Vietnam.

In March 2018, the French group Actions by Christians or the Abolition of Torture (ACAT) urged for an immediate release of Ton.
