= Lê Công Định =

Vietnamese lawyer

Lê Công Định (born 1 October 1968) is a Vietnamese lawyer who sat on the defence of many high-profile human rights cases in Vietnam. He was critical of bauxite mining in the central highlands of Vietnam, and was arrested by the Vietnamese government on 13 June 2009 on charges of "national security", though the arrest was met with strong objections from the international community. Lê Công Định is one of Amnesty International's prisoners of conscience.

== Life before arrest ==
Định studied law at Hanoi Law School and Saigon University. He studied in the United States at Tulane University as a Fulbright scholar and received his master of law degree from Tulane in 2000.

In 2003, Định worked for a local law firm called YKVN, which is contracted to provide local assisting services for White & Case LLP, as US-based lawfirm that was appointed to represent VASEP (Vietnam Association of Seafoods Export Processors) an industrial association that successfully represented Vietnamese catfish farmers in a trade dispute in the US Department of Commerce.

Just prior to his arrest, Định was a defense lawyer for high-profile democracy and religious freedom activists, and was known for publicly supporting famous Vietnamese political dissidents including Nguyễn Văn Đài, Lê Thị Công Nhân, and Nguyễn Văn Hải (known as Dieu Cay).

== Arrest and charges ==
On 13 June 2009 police from the Ministry of Public Security's Investigation Security Agency raided Lê Công Định's law offices. He was arrested on "national security charges" under article 88 of Vietnam's criminal code ("conducting propaganda against the government"). Since his arrest, his current location and condition is unknown.

Deputy Director General Department of Security Vu Hai Trieu announced that documents and conspiracy evidences had been confiscated which indicate an attempt to overthrow the state of Vietnam by Định.

The arrest came a week after President Nguyen Minh Triet vowed in front of the International Association of Democratic Lawyers in Hanoi that the government respects and supports progressive lawyers and that it will criticize those who "trample democracy and human rights."

On 24 December 2009, Định was charged with "attempts to overthrow the state", after being initially charged with "spreading anti-government propaganda".

On 20 January 2010, he was convicted and sentenced to 5 years in prison for subversion. His co-defendants, Nguyễn Tiến Trung, Trần Huỳnh Duy Thức and Lê Thăng Long received sentences from 7 to 16 years.

== International response ==
Numerous governments and organizations have condemned the arrest and demanded Lê Công Định's immediate release.

The U.S. Commission on International Religious Freedom (USCIRF) describes Định as a "peaceful human rights defender" and released a statement that "The arrest of Lê Công Định demonstrates a disturbing but familiar pattern. Peaceful advocates for religious freedom and related human rights are intimidated, harassed, and jailed. Lê Công Định’s arrest demonstrates that no human rights, including the freedom of religion, are secure in Vietnam.”

A statement on the United States Department of State website reads "Vietnam's arrest of Mr. Định contradicts the government's own commitment to internationally accepted standards of human rights and to the rule of law. We urge the Government of Vietnam to release Mr. Định immediately and unconditionally, as well as all other prisoners in detention for peacefully expressing their views."

Referencing President Nguyen Minh Triet's address the week prior, The Human Rights Watch's Asia director called "this arrest makes a mockery of the president's lofty words. It tells other lawyers and human rights defenders just what they can expect if they dare to speak out."

The International Bar Association's (IBA's) Human Rights Institute calls the arrest "arbitrary" and expressed concern in a letter to Prime Minister Nguyen Tan Dung "that the arrest could be linked to the fact that Mr Lê Công Định has expressed critical views on the Vietnamese government".

Viet Tan, the Vietnam Reform Party, released a statement calling for "a release of attorney Lê Công Định and other political prisoners who have been in jail or were recently detained."

On 17 June 2009, Amnesty International, who granted Lê Công Định with the status of prisoner of conscience, issued a statement calling the authorities to release him immediately and to "either repeal or amend provisions in the 1999 Penal Code which criminalize peaceful political dissent".

Reporters Without Borders and IFEX have also called for the immediate release of Lê Công Định.

== Release ==
On February 6, 2013, Định was released from prison but remained under house arrest.

== See also ==
- Human rights in Vietnam
- Vietnamese democracy movement
