= Philippe Trần Văn Hoài =

Vietnamese Roman Catholic prelate (1929–2010)

Monsignor Philipphê Trần Văn Hoài, also known as Filippo (22 March 1929 – 2 February 2010) was a Vietnamese Roman Catholic prelate and activist.

In the 1980s, Hoài was mandated by the Vatican with the responsibility of shepherding the global Vietnamese Catholic diaspora. He organized a freedom of worship gathering, "Prayer Day for Peace in Viet Nam" at the Vatican with Pope John Paul II and leaders of the main Vietnamese religions. He also wrote the foreword to the first edition of The Road of Hope, a book compiling the messages of the cardinal Nguyễn Văn Thuận during his 13-year imprisonment by the Socialist Republic of Vietnam. He celebrated 50 years of priesthood with the 2009 publication of his book, The Human Destiny of Jesus Christ, which he dedicated to "the faithful of all religions".

== Early life ==
Hoài was born in An Ninh in central Vietnam, the second child in a family of modest wealth and limited political connections. In 1943, he entered An Ninh Minor Seminary, where he was a classmate of the future cardinal Nguyễn Văn Thuận. After the conclusion of French occupation of Vietnam in 1954, he was ordained a priest in 1959 at La Vang, the sanctuary commemorating a vision of the Blessed Virgin Mary. He was the first priest to be ordained at the sanctuary and, as of 2010, one of three priests to receive the honor. Soon after his ordination, he was appointed parish priest at Bác Vọng, Huế. In 1961, he was appointed a faculty member of Phú Xuân Minor Seminary and later in 1962, a rector of Hoàn Thiên Minor Seminary. Upon being selected to study at the Vatican, he left Vietnam in 1969.

== Vatican life ==
After studying for four years at the Vatican he was appointed Vice Rector of the Pontificio Collegio Urbano de Propaganda Fide in 1973. In 1978, three years after the fall of Saigon on 30 April 1975, he was appointed Director of the Vietnamese Refugee Office of Caritas Italiana, an Italian Roman Catholic charity. In 1979, at a time of "compassion fatigue" when an increasing number of countries stranded Vietnamese boat people at sea, he took part as interpreter in a rescue mission by accompanying three Italian Navy frigates to the South Pacific. From 1984 to 1987, he was Treasurer of the Missionario Internazionale San Paolo Apostolo, the pontifical college of future bishops, cardinals and other important prelates who have been sent to Rome to study.

He was conferred the title Monsignor in 1986. In 1988, Hoài was appointed by Pope John Paul II as Director of the Center of Pastoral Apostolate for Overseas Vietnamese, to oversee the global Overseas Vietnamese Catholic diaspora.

He held this title until 2000, traveling extensively to work with Overseas Vietnamese communities from Europe, Japan, Australia to the U.S. He reportedly played crucial behind-the-scenes roles in publishing and globally distributing The Road of Hope, written in prison by his former classmate and then-Archbishop Nguyễn Văn Thuận, who had been detained by the government of Vietnam for his faith and family connections. Hoài wrote the foreword in the first edition of the book and campaigned to keep Archbishop Thuận's name in the global conscience.

In 1988, Hoài was appointed to chair the Organizing Committee of the Celebration of the Canonization of 117 Vietnamese martyrs. He founded the global Vietnamese Laity in Diaspora Movement in 1992, an association which encourages Vietnamese expatriate parishioners to actively engage in politics to address social injustice. The movement now has 12 chapters around the world. In 1992 he organized a freedom of worship gathering called the "Prayer Day for Peace in Viet Nam", at the Vatican with Pope John Paul II and leaders of the main Vietnamese religions; a first in Vietnam's history. He was subsequently nominated to chair an inter-religious body to promote discourse and association. In 1995, he presided over the establishment of the Vietnamese cultural center Nguyễn Trường Tô (NTT), publishing Định Hương. Under the umbrella of NTT, there were an inter-religious discussion of Vietnamese theology in Switzerland (1996); a symposium to begin a dialogue between Overseas Vietnamese teachers, professionals and students (1996); and a forum for Vietnamese emigrants to deliberate the moral foundation for national reformation and restoration (1997).

== Later life ==
He retired in 2000. In 2007, in response to the imprisonment of the Catholic priest Thadeus Nguyễn Văn Lý in Vietnam, Hoài penned an open letter to the Catholic symposium in Orange County, California, arguing for the release of Father Lý.

== Last years and death ==
Hoài continued his scholarly writing and in 2009 published The Human Destiny in Jesus Christ, which he dedicated to "the faithful of all religions". The same year he celebrated 50 years of priesthood. He died on 2 February 2010, aged 80, in Rome, from heart disease. He was buried in Campo Verano, Vatican City.

== Global responses by overseas Vietnamese communities ==
Among the memorial services held in his honor were in the United States (Boston, Massachusetts; Orange County, California), in Europe (Netherlands; Rome), in Tokyo, Japan. In Vietnam, Lý authored a letter of condolence from prison, calling the monsignor a champion of Vietnamese refugees, a patriot and visionary. Mai Thanh Luong of California, the first Vietnamese-American bishop in North America, honored Hoài as his role model, lauding him as "a person who was a visionary in regards to the causes of the people and who contributed much to theology."

== Quotes ==
- "What continues to push us, despite all the sacrifices, is the knowledge that our suffering will benefit the Church and our beloved Vietnam" (from In Search of a Theological Vietnam, a paper presented at an inter-religious discussion of Vietnamese theology in Switzerland in 1996).

== See also ==
- Roman Catholicism in Vietnam
