= Assembly of Vietnamese Youth for Democracy =

Official logo of the Assembly of Vietnamese Youth for Democracy

Assembly of Vietnamese Youth for Democracy or Democratic Youth Movement (in Vietnamese: Tập hợp Thanh niên Dân chủ, also known under the English and Vietnamese acronyms AVYD and THTNDC respectively) is an organization of young Vietnamese worldwide intent on pushing for political freedom in Vietnam. The movement was founded by Nguyễn Tiến Trung a student dissident recently arrested by the authorities in Vietnam July 7, 2009 and charged with "plotting to overthrow the regime".

== Founding ==
The organization was founded on May 8, 2006 by Nguyễn Tiến Trung, a Vietnamese student while studying overseas in France. The precipitant was a letter sent to the Ministry of Education seeking redress for the heavy ideological load within the Vietnamese education curriculum. Trung proposed a full reform of the system, eliminating the preeminence of Marxist-Leninist thinking.

For the THTNDC, the objectives set forth are:

- Promote democratic principles in Vietnam
- Create a forum for the coming together of youths and the exchange of ideas
- Anticipate the participation of youths in political parties.

== Organizational structure ==
The Assembly of Vietnamese Youth for Democracy is headed by the Representative Council as set forth in the Charter. The Representative Council designates individual members to supervise the organization's activities in specific geographical areas. Different mediums are employed for the dissemination of news and directives. Despite the state-controlled mass communication in Vietnam, THTNDC justifies its activities on the 69th Article of Constitution of Vietnam (guaranteeing freedom of expression), the 20th Article of Universal Declaration of Human Rights, and the 21st and 22nd Article of International Covenant on Civil and Political Rights.

== Political activism ==
THTNDC promotes the democratization of Vietnam mostly through its youths by encouraging the exchange of political ideas and participation, and the dissemination of democratic principles. The organization seeks to prepare the younger population to take part in the political spheres.

THTNDC also takes on social issues, advocating for anti-corruption campaigns, fighting on behalf of farmers against forced land seizures, and calling for the respect for the rule-of-law. The latter would include the creation of a civil society, judicial independence, freedom of the press.

In late 2006 taking advantage of the APEC summit being hosted in Hanoi, THTNDC organized a mass assembly named "Nối Vòng Tay Lớn" (Extend Embracing Arms) to collect signatures in a petition the APEC leaders directly. The intent was pressure the Vietnamese government in the midst of the international spotlight to respect the Universal Declaration of Human Rights which it had signed. The campaign also had the goal of uniting all Vietnamese, in-country and overseas, regardless of religious and political views to raise their voices in unison in the name of democracy. Nguyễn Tiến Trung himself visited US President George W. Bush, seeking his support at the Broken Spoke ranch in Texas at a fund raising event hosted by the Republican Party.

THTNDC also won the endorsement of the Belgian Deputy to the Council of Europe Johan Weyts, and René van der Linden, President of the Parliamentary Assembly of the Council of Europe in support of Vietnamese democracy.

The organization has aligned itself with the Vietnam Democratic Party, originally created in 1944 but had ceased formal operation in 1988. It was resurrected by a high ranking party-member-turned-dissident Hoang Minh Chinh in 2006 and THTNDC joined the Democratic Party's call for a peaceful transformation of Vietnam politics.

Other Activities

- May 8/2006 – Viet Youth for Democracy (VYD) was founded by Nguyen Tien Trung and other Vietnamese students.
- May 18–21/2006–2079 signatures were collected within 72 hours in an open letter in order to send it to United Nation Secretary General Mr. Kofi Annan for his journey in Vietnam, from 23 to 25 May 2006.
- June 25/2006 – Institute National des Sciences Appliquées de Rennes: Signatures were collected from VYD members, INSA professors and many Vietnamese scholars in France.
- July 1-September 11/2006 – France: Hand-in-Hand Marathon was initiated, connecting people worldwide to collect signatures asking the APEC (Asia-Pacific Economic Cooperation) leaders to support for democracy in Vietnam. The APEC summit was host by the Socialist Republic of Vietnam in Hanoi in November 2006.
- July 1/2006 – Place de Trocadéro, Paris: Hand-in-Hand Marathon officially started.
- July 15/2006 – California: Attended Vietnamese Student Association annual meeting in San Jose, shared with other youths about issues and situation in Vietnam.
- July 16/2006 – California: Hand-in-Hand Marathon torch passed San Jose, with many Vietnamese supporters and local city representatives.
- August 11/2006 – Texas: Met the former president George W. Bush and his staffs at the Broken Spoke Ranch in Austin, Texas.
- August 13/2006 – Paris: Members of VYD cycled within the city (Sorbonne University, Chinatown 13è, Bastilles, Place de Tracadéro) to collect signatures.
- September 3/2006 – Belgium: Cycling Marathon across European Union Congress and other central centers within Brussels.

Hand-in-Hand Marathon ended. VYD met with former Senator Johan Weyts of Belgium.

- September 25/2006 – Belgium: Met and exchanged information about VYD and Vietnam with René Van der Linden, Chair of the Parliamentary Assembly of the Council of Europe in Brussels.
- October 31/2006 – Over 3300 signatures were scanned and sent via postal service to offices of APEC leader that attended the conference in Vietnam.
- November 9/2006 – Canada: Nguyen Tien Trung met the Prime Minister of Canada Stephen Harper and other Canadian officials. Prime Minister Stephen Harper reminded the Vietnamese government regarding its human rights violation in Vietnam during the APEC conference in Hanoi.
- March 17/2007 – Youth Voices Radio officially launched via the Internet. Visit Youth Voices Radio here.
- April 25/2007 – Tạp chí Thanh Niên PHÍA TRƯỚC (AHEAD Magazine) formally published its 1st issue in Vietnamese via publication and online PDF version. For more information, visit www.phiatruoc.info.
- May 8/2007 – VYD celebrated 1-year anniversary.

VYD members translated Handbook for Bloggers and Cyber-Dissidents from Reporters Without Borders into Vietnamese. Nguyen Tien Trung returned to Vietnam after completed his master's degree at INSA, France.

- March 2008 – Vietnam: Nguyen Tien Trung was drafted into the People's Army of Vietnam.
- March 21/2008 – France: VYD demonstrated in Paris, France to support the Tibetans.
- May 8–9/2008 – France: VYD Representatives participated in the Annual Democracy Conference 2008 held in Paris, France.
- May–August/2008 – Advertised Tạp chí Thanh Niên PHÍA TRƯỚC (AHEAD Magazine) across Europe.
- Aug/2008 – Vietnam: VYD members gathered in Sài Gòn, Việt Nam.

Met and exchanged information regarding issues in Vietnam with Reporters Without Borders, SESAWE, etc. Completed audio book Tâm Tình Với Tuổi Trẻ Việt Nam by Bùi Tín. Participated in the open ceremony of the Vietnamese Laborer Commission in Paris.

- April 25/2009 – Tạp chí Thanh Niên PHÍA TRƯỚC (AHEAD Magazine) 2nd anniversary.
- June 9–10/2009 – California: VYD Representatives attended Annual Democracy Conference 2009 in San Jose.
- June 16/2009 – VYD opposed the unlawfully arrest of Le Cong Dinh by the Vietnam Public Security.
- July 7/2009 – Vietnam: Nguyen Tien Trung was arrested in Sài Gòn, Việt Nam.
- July 16/2009 – Vietnam: Member of VYD Board of Representatives was detained in Sài Gòn, Việt Nam.
- August/2009 – VYD website was hacked
- November/2009 – Germany: Tạp chí Thanh Niên PHÍA TRƯỚC (AHEAD Magazine) attended 20-years anniversary on the Fall of the Berlin Wall in Berlin.
- December 1/2009 – Initiated signatures campaign to support Nguyen Tien Trung.
- January 20/2010 – England: Members of VYD demonstrated in front of the Embassy of Socialist Republic of Vietnam to show their support for Nguyen Tien Trung, Le Cong Dinh, Trần Huỳnh Duy Thức, Le Thang Long and Tran Anh Kim.
- January 21/2010 – Vietnam: Nguyen Tien Trung was sentenced to 5 years in prison and 3 years of probation by *Feb/2010 – VYD voted new member for Board of Representatives, term February – August 2010.
- March 1/2010 – VYD sent an official letter to the Socialist Republic of Vietnam and Congress expressed its concern regarding the long-term land leasing in the Northern and Central Highland of Vietnam to China.
- April/2010 – Tạp chí Thanh Niên PHÍA TRƯỚC (AHEAD Magazine) 3rd anniversary, click here to read the Special Edition and interview with Radio Free Asia.
- April 29/2010 – Bloomington, Indiana: Professor David Williams sent a letter to President Nguyen Minh Triet, offered to sponsor Le Cong Dinh and Nguyen Tien Trung to study at Indiana University Maurer School of Law.
- May 4/2010 – VYD members participated in a documentary movie Danger From the North.
- May 8/2010 – VYD 4th anniversary
- May 16/2010 – England: VYD and Amnesty International protested in front of Embassy of Socialist Republic of Vietnam in London to illustrate support for Nguyen Tien Trung, Le Cong Dinh, Tran Huynh Duy Thuc, Le Thang Long, Tran Anh Kim and other democracy activists.
- May 23/2010 – VYD members assembled in Washington, D.C.
- May 24/2010 – Washington, D.C.: VYD Board of Representatives met with Dr. Sophie Richardson at Human Right Watch office, requested HRW to visit prisoners of conscience in Vietnam.
- May 24/2010 – Washington, D.C.: VYD Board of Representatives met with Amnesty International USA.

VYD Board of Representatives met with Bureau of Democracy, Human Rights and Labor – U.S. State Department. VYD Board of Representatives greeted the local Vietnamese community in Washington, D.C.

- May 25/2010 – Washington, D.C.: VYD Board of Representatives met with Congressman Joseph Cao's office.

== Suppression and response ==
The organization's founder, Nguyễn Tiến Trung, was arrested on July 7, 2009, and charged with "plotting to overthrow the communist government of Vietnam".

According to a formal announcement of the Assembly of Vietnamese Youth for Democracy toward the confession tape of Nguyen Tien Trung and the other pro-democracy activists, the Assembly proclaimed the action of filming the defendant, while under investigation, appeared to be an abusing movement formally forbidden by law as well as disparaging and derogatorily violating to the defendants' esteem. Comprehensively regarding to the weak rule of law of Vietnam communist government, the Assembly steadfastly articulated that no one should have been convicted for their crimes before the verdict became officially and called on Vietnam communist government to respect the democratic processes in the legal proceedings against all of the defendants. The members of the Assembly of Vietnamese Youth for Democracy have undoubtedly been positioning their beliefs into Nguyen Tien Trung and other under-arrested dissidents, pro-democracy activists whose detentions, caused by the unarguable peaceful activism, were resulted without charge or trial. The Assembly formally have made another call to Vietnam communist government for, basing on the ground of Vietnam constitutional respect and international conventions, an immediate and unconditional release of the under arrested dissidents and pro-democracy activists.

== See also ==
- Nguyễn Tiến Trung
