= Phan Thanh Hải =

Vietnamese dissident blogger (born 1969)

- Born: c. 1969
- Other names: Anhbasg; Anh Ba Sai Gon
- Known for: Dissident blogging and 2010 arrest
- Awards: Hellman/Hammett Award (2011)

Phan Thanh Hải (born c. 1969) is a Vietnamese dissident blogger. Blogging as "Anhbasg" or "Anh Ba Sài Gòn" at the website "Independent Journalists' Club", Phan discussed controversial topics including other dissidents, Vietnam's maritime border with China, and government corruption scandals.

A lawyer by training, Phan was denied permission to practice due to his blogging and his involvement in protests. In 2007, he was arrested after a protest against the Beijing Olympics and later placed under police surveillance.

In October 2010, he was arrested in Ho Chi Minh City and charged with disseminating anti-state information and materials, carrying a maximum sentence of twenty years' imprisonment; he later confessed to the charges. Fellow "Independent Journalists' Club" posters Nguyen Van Hai and Ta Phong Tan were also arrested. Though their trial was scheduled to begin in August, it was delayed indefinitely after Ta's mother Dang Thi Kim Lieng immolated herself in front of the government offices in Bac Lieu province in protest of the trial.

The UN Office of the High Commissioner for Human Rights criticized the arrests, stating its concern for "what appears to be increasingly limited space for freedom of expression in Viet Nam". In a July 2012 visit to Hanoi, US Secretary of State Hillary Clinton expressed concern for the detention of the three members of the Free Vietnamese Journalists' Club. Amnesty International described the three bloggers as prisoners of conscience, "detained solely for the peaceful exercise of their right to freedom of expression through their online writings", and urged their release. The International Federation for Human Rights and World Organisation Against Torture also released a joint statement calling on the Vietnamese government to release the three bloggers unconditionally. In 2011, Human Rights Watch awarded him a Hellman/Hammett Award for "writers who demonstrate courage and conviction in the face of political persecution".

On 4 October 2012, Panh Than Hai pleaded guilty and was sentenced to four years in prison in a one-day hearing The Economist described as looking "very much like an old-fashioned Soviet-style show trial". Prosecutors stated that the three had "distorted the truth about State and Party, created anxiety among citizens and supported schemes to overthrow the government", while the court found that they were "seriously affecting national security and the image of the country in the global arena." On the same day, Ta Phong Tan was sentenced to ten years' imprisonment, and Nguyen Van Hai, to twelve years.
