= Lê Quốc Quân =

Vietnamese human rights lawyer and activist

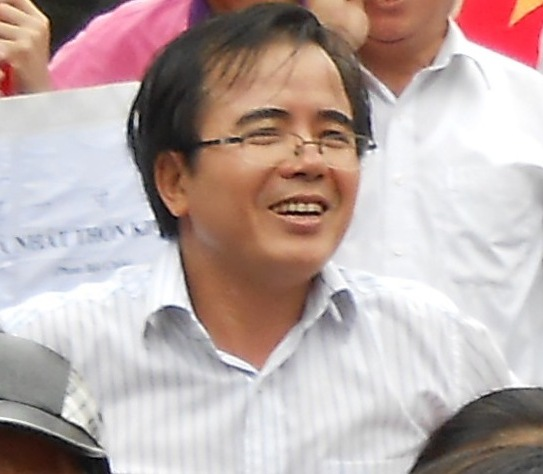
- Born: 13 September 1971 (age 54)
- Occupation: lawyer
- Known for: democracy activism, 2007 detention

Lê Quốc Quân (born 13 September 1971) is a Vietnamese human rights lawyer, democracy activist and Catholic blogger. He was arrested by the Vietnamese government on charges of tax evasion on 27 December 2012, convicted on 2 October 2013, and sentenced to 30 months in prison. The arrest was condemned by international human rights organizations and the US government.

== 2007–2011 activism and arrests ==
On 8 March 2007, Quân was detained after he returned to Vietnam from a fellowship with the U.S.-based National Endowment for Democracy. The detention led U.S. presidential candidate John McCain and former Secretary of State Madeleine Albright to write to Vietnam in protest and Amnesty International to name him a prisoner of conscience. During Quân's detention, U.S. Ambassador Michael Marine invited his wife to tea at the U.S. Embassy, but was unable to meet her when police blocked her from entering. Vietnamese authorities accused Quân of "activities to overthrow the people's government", but did not formally charge him. He was released three months later.

Quân is a Roman Catholic and an advocate for religious freedom. He participated in a march of Catholics on 29 January 2008 at Saint Joseph Cathedral in Hanoi, protesting the government's occupation of land also claimed by the church. He later told reporters that he had been beaten by guards during the march.

On 5 April 2011, he was re-arrested along with Phạm Hồng Sơn when attempting to observe the trial of democracy activist Cù Huy Hà Vũ. The pair were held for "causing public disorder". Son's wife Vu Thu Ha stated that Son had been assaulted by police with batons prior to his arrest. After the U.S. government and human rights groups called for the men's release, both were released without charge on 13 April.

== Tax evasion conviction ==
In July 2012, Independent Catholic News reported that he had been threatened by state media for his activism on behalf of his diocese. Police raided his office and attempted to take him to a police station, but were blocked by Quân's supporters.

On 19 August 2012, Quân was attacked by police near his home in Hanoi. He was returning to his home when he was attacked, at around 8pm. He was injured in the head, back and knee and required hospitalization. The attack prompted US-based Human Rights Watch to call for a full investigation He had been harassed before and stated his belief that this attack was connected to the police.

On 18 December 2012, Quân published a piece on his blog that was critical of the government's cling to power. The article entitled "Constitution or a contract for electricity and water service?" criticized the Vietnam National Assembly for an article that states that the Communist Party should have a de facto leading role in Vietnam. In the article, which was published by BBC, Quân writes, "I may be put in prison. Nevertheless, my belief in human beings, the importance of the issue and the consciousness of a citizen urged me to write."

Nine days after the publication, on December 27, 2012, when Quân was dropping off his daughter at school, he was arrested by the police. The police searched his office, confiscated documents and told his family that he will be charged under Article 161 of the Criminal Code relating to tax evasion.

Quân was then detained incommunicado in Hoa Lo Prison with no access to his lawyer and family. Three days after his detention, he has started a hunger strike in prison, which lasted for at least four days.

On 2 October 2013, Quân was sentenced to 30 months in prison for tax evasion and given a $59,000 fine. Supporters of Quân attempted to march on the courthouse but were stopped by police. Quân's lawyer stated that his client intends to appeal.

BBC News reported that the US government had been negotiating on Quân's behalf, and that "authorities may have been seeking a compromise so that his sentence was not long enough to upset Washington but sufficient to keep him behind bars." The US Embassy issued a statement following the sentence calling on the government to release Quân and other political prisoners. Amnesty International called the charges "trumped-up" and called for his immediate release.

In 2013, the United Nations Working Group on Arbitrary Detention condemned Quân’s detention as violating his right to freedom of expression and his right to a fair trial . It found that Quân had been targeted for his work as an activist and as a blogger and called for his immediate release or for his conviction to be reviewed by an independent court. It also recommended that Viet Nam pay damages to Quân for his arbitrary detention.

On 18 February 2014, the Court of Appeal in Hanoi upheld Quân’s conviction. The decision of the United Nations Working Group on Arbitrary Detention was not taken into account.

On 5 September 2014, the Media Legal Defence Initiative filed another petition to the UN Working Group on Arbitrary Detention, on behalf of a coalition of other NGOs, including Lawyers’ Rights Watch Canada, Lawyers for Lawyers, Electronic Frontier Foundation, Reporters Without Borders, English PEN, Avocats Sans Frontières Network, Article 19, National Endowment for Democracy and the World Movement for Democracy, and the Center for International Law Philippines.

Quân was released on 27 June 2015. He has served the full sentence of 30 months, without any deduction. Prior to his release, a broad coalition of NGO's urged the Government of Viet Nam to respect his human rights, to reinstate his license to work as a lawyer, and to grant him reparation for the arbitrary detention he suffered.

Upon his release, he was asked in an interview if he will continue his human rights works. He answered: ‘Of course! I will continue with doing what I believe is good for the Nation. I will be working for a better Viet Nam. Progress for our Nation is my goal. Yes, I am afraid that I will be arrested again. I try to overcome the fear. I will go ahead, because I believe it is good for the people of Viet Nam. I will not go abroad, I prefer to stay in Viet Nam. It is worth it, even if I devote my life'.

== International support ==
Following the 2007 arrest, U.S. presidential candidate John McCain and former Secretary of State Madeleine Albright expressed their support in freeing Quân. Amnesty International named him a prisoner of conscience.

Following the 2012 arrest, Human Rights Watch have called for these "politically motivated charges to be dropped". The organization also pointed out the similarity of using "tax evasion charges" to frame political dissidents such as in the case of Dieu Cay. The World Organization Against Torture likewise called for the charges to be dropped and for his immediate release.

In 2013, Quân, together with Tran Huynh Duy Thuc and Nguyen Hoang Quoc Hung, was awarded Vietnam Human Rights Award from Vietnam Human Rights Network.

The EU recognizes Quân as a Prisoner of Concern. On 18 February 2014, it formally expressed its concern over the judgment of the Appeal Court.

A broad coalition of NGO's has repeatedly requested that Quân be released.

On 16 September 2014, L4L delivered an oral statement at the UN Human Rights Council, to once again demand attention for the situation of Quân. Oral Statement HRC 15-9-2014

== See also ==
- Catholic Church in Vietnam
- Human rights in Vietnam
- Vietnamese democracy movement
- 2011 crackdown on Vietnamese youth activists
- Paulus Lê Sơn
- Tạ Phong Tần
- Nguyễn Văn Hải
- Nguyễn Văn Đài
