= 2018 Vietnam protests =

Series of violent and nonviolent protests

- Part of Protests against democratic backsliding
- Date: 9–17 June 2018
- Location: Across Vietnam, including: Ho Chi Minh City; Hanoi; Da Nang; Binh Thuan Province; Ha Tinh Province; Khanh Hoa Province; Tay Ninh Province
- Caused by: Special Zone Act; Cybersecurity Law; Environmental issues; Economic and social problems; Authoritarianism; Corruption; Repression
- Methods: Demonstrations; Nonviolent resistance; Online activism; Civil disobedience; General strikes; Riots
- Result: Over 200 protesters arrested; Postponement of Special Zone Act; Cybersecurity Law passed on January 1, 2019

Parties
Protesters Supported by: Việt Tân (alleged, denied); Third Republic of Vietnam (alleged)	Government of Vietnam; Communist Party of Vietnam; Politburo; Ho Chi Minh Communist Youth Union; Ministry of Public Security; Vietnam People's Public Security; Mobile Police Command; People’s Army of Vietnam; Vietnam Militia and Self-Defence Force

Lead figures
No centralised leadership	Nguyễn Xuân Phúc; Nguyễn Phú Trọng; Trần Đại Quang; Tô Lâm; Ngô Xuân Lịch

Casualties
- Deaths: 1 protester dead
- Injuries: A few police officers and protesters
- Arrested: ~200

The 2018 Vietnam protests, June 10 Events, or Protests against the Special Zone Act and the Cybersecurity Law (Vietnamese: Biểu tình phản đối Luật đặc khu kinh tế và Luật An ninh mạng), were a series of both violent and nonviolent protests that erupted across Vietnam in June 2018, chiefly in response to two drafted pieces of legislation: the Special Zone Act and the Cybersecurity Law.

The Special Zone Act (also known as the Special Zones Law or the Special Economic Zones Law) proposes the opening of three special economic zones (SEZs) across Vietnam, where foreign investors would be allowed to lease land for up to 99 years. Despite no specific mention of China within the lines of the bill, many Vietnamese feared that the SEZs would be dominated by China, leading to worries about the loss of national sovereignty. On 9 June 2018, the Vietnamese authorities eventually yielded under enormous public pressure and postponed voting on the law indefinitely.

The Cybersecurity Law has been described as “largely a copy-and-paste version” of the Chinese Cybersecurity Law that commenced a year prior. The National Assembly of Vietnam passed the law on 12 June 2018 despite local and international opposition and it has been in effect since 1 January 2019.

== Context ==
=== Protest culture in Vietnam ===
To mainstream media and many nongovernmental organizations, Vietnam is often perceived as harsh and uncompromising regarding the right to freedom of assembly. Reports from Human Rights Watch and the US State Department depict the ruling Communist Party of Vietnam (CPV) as extremely illiberal and unforgiving of political dissent of any kind. Freedom House’s report on Vietnam in 2020 scores the country at 1 out of 4 for freedom of assembly, specifically citing the arrests and convictions as a result of the 2018 protests as the reason for its score, and 0 out of 4 for freedom for nongovernmental organizations and trade unions or similar professional organizations. Amnesty International also reports harassment and prosecution of pro-democracy activists, independent journalists, authors, and publishers in its Vietnam 2020 review. According to Human Rights Watch, in April 2018 the chief judge in Hanoi sentenced political activists to 7 to 12 years of imprisonment each under Article 79 of the Criminal Code for political activism.

Scholars and observers of Vietnam, however, have a different outlook. Many agree that the country has actually been exercising a responsive-repressive strategy since the 1990s, taking certain measures to show its responsiveness and tolerance to criticism from its citizens and exercising repression only as a last resort. Political scientist and Emeritus Professor at the Australian National University Ben Kerkvliet found that Vietnamese citizens “frequently and publicly” spoke out in criticism of their living and working conditions, most often through thousands of strikes, occasionally with thousands of participants each. His 2019 book Speaking Out in Vietnam: public political criticism in a communist party-ruled nation showed that at least since 1990, public political criticism has evolved into a prominent feature of Vietnam's political landscape. In the book, he also showed how government officials were in reality often sympathetic to workers’ demands, accommodating to concerns with land confiscation, and even to some extent tolerating calls for democratization that threatened the ideology of the regime.

=== Past anti-China protests in Vietnam ===
Although public demonstrations are not common in Vietnam, anti-China protests has occurred on numerous occasions and are met with a balance of responsiveness and repression by the state, albeit with extra caution given the addition of an external party – China, no less – into the state-society relationship in Vietnam.

Among the Vietnamese populace, anti-China sentiments act as a converging space for their dissatisfaction with a variety of social issues in the country such as unfavorable labour conditions, environmental pollution, socio-economic development, and foreign policy. Placing China as a ‘common enemy’ thereby acts as a linkage between these social groups with mutual encouragement and reinforcement of these sentiments. Post–Cold War, and especially since 2010, the sharpest crises and ensuing anti-China protests in Vietnam have involved public outrage over territorial disputes in the South China Sea.

In May 2011, for instance, a Chinese maritime vessel cut the cables of a Vietnamese ship conducting research operating in Vietnamese waters in the South China Sea, and hundreds in Vietnam took to the streets for over three months in sustained protest. Demonstrators in Hanoi sang patriotic songs, chanted slogans, and carried banners and flags, including a Chinese flag digitally altered to include a pirate’s skull and crossbones. Public anger flared up even more intensely in 2014, when China deployed Haiyang Shiyou 981, a giant oil rig in an area of the South China Sea claimed by Vietnam. This incident triggered large-scale anti-China demonstrations with thousands of participants that quickly turned violent. Protesters set fire to industrial parks and factories, hunted down and sparred with Chinese workers, and attacked police during the confrontations, leaving at least 21 people dead and nearly 100 injured.

Such territorial disputes are particularly affective because they are viewed as challenges and violations of Vietnam’s sovereignty, an especially sore subject when it comes to China given the history of border clashes between the two countries until 1991, such as the two-month bloody Sino-Vietnamese border war not four decades prior in 1979. An op-ed in the Vietnam News sums up the ground sentiments for anti-China protests in a message of solidarity: "The Vietnamese people are angry. The nation is angry. We are telling the world that we are angry. We have every right to be angry. […] The message from all these demonstrations is simple and straightforward: China should stop violating international law and respect Viet Nam's sovereignty. […] We are a small country, but we are not weak. We will stand as one, united in the cause of protecting our motherland's integrity."

==== Vietnamese state response ====
When it comes to the Vietnam government’s response, observers note that authorities have generally allowed such anti-China protests, only clamping down on protesters in the presence of violence. Appearing compliant to China could harm the political careers of the Vietnamese politicians as being seen as anti-nationalistic and weaken legitimacy. Additionally, scholars have noted that the international coverage and sympathy due to such protests may be used to communicate the extent of outrage in Vietnam and legitimize the country’s pleas for international support. In both the 2011 and 2014 instances, authorities clearly tolerated the demonstrations in the beginning, allowing protesters to march the streets and stopping or redirecting traffic several times to let them cross streets throughout the march. The government further took steps to mollify public anger and show support for the protesters by echoing their sentiments in harsh rhetoric and strongly-worded official statements against China using words such as ‘brazen’ and ‘illegal’.

However, Hanoi walks a very thin line to maintain their careful hedging strategy in relations with China. Given the clear differences in size, capacity, and military power and force, antagonizing China and pushing the issue too far could seriously impact bilateral relations and threaten the existing asymmetrical relationship that has been carefully negotiated throughout the centuries of history. Vietnam’s population size is 7% of China’s; its Gross National Product 3% of China’s; its military budget less than 1% of China’s. Vietnam’s total trade with China was 20% of its total trade in 2015, and a quarter of tourists to Vietnam in 2013 were from China. Vietnam is also partially dependent on China for ideological and economic support, with China being Vietnam’s biggest guide and protector in Marxism-Leninism and market socialism. With all of this in mind, both the 2011 and 2014 protests were eventually met with curtailment and suppression, as the authorities ordered a crackdown after deeming the invisible line to be crossed. In 2011, the Hanoi city government issued an order to end the protests that were “undermining national unity” and “complicating diplomatic efforts”, warning demonstrators that authorities would “take necessary measures” against those who disobeyed, and following up on the threat when marches continued.

The relationship between the two countries is not totally skewed, however – both sides are bound by the 16 Word Guideline, a statement announced by the General Secretary of the Communist Party of Vietnam and the General Secretary of the Chinese Communist Party in 1999 as a guide for Sino-Vietnamese relations in the future. Specifically, it stipulated that both countries commit to “long-term, stable, future-oriented, good neighborly and all-round cooperative relations”. A study analyzing major diplomatic events from the 1990s to 2018 between the two countries showcase how this official term has been brought up at every single summit meeting since its conception, reminding both sides of their commitment to maintaining bilateral relations. The author thus provides an alternate view to the traditional approach of power politics that emphasize asymmetry between China and Vietnam, instead arguing that the 16 Word Guideline has led to a powerful coercive rhetoric that exerts strong influences on both sides to avoid domestic instability and military conflict.

Regarding the South China Sea in particular, Vietnam pursues a strategy of ‘cooperation and struggle’ with China – for instance, engaging in a defence self-help programme at home with deliveries of kilo-class submarines while engaging major powers including the United States, Russia, India, and Japan to maintain the power balance in the Sea. While the anti-China protests did not change Vietnam’s foreign policy towards China both during the disputes or in the long-term, the pressure was successfully manipulated for Vietnam’s benefit, with the United States acceding the sale of equipment and weapons for maritime defense purposes, India extending a $100 million credit line for defense procurement, and Japan providing six maritime vessels and training to Vietnam’s coast guard (and with improved relations) during the crises.

All in all, within this trio – the Vietnamese people, the Vietnamese government, and the Chinese government – it is all about preserving a delicate balance between appeasing protests and approving of nationalism while maintaining the negotiated asymmetry and avoiding harm to bilateral relations. A study based on an analysis of 570 Vietnamese newspaper articles shows how the Vietnamese government was truly balanced in its response to anti-China protests, extensively publicizing the conflict to show opposition to Chinese aggression but also channeling the anger towards China into a “more positive and constructive form of pro-government nationalism”. Scholars ultimately agree on the general approach taken by Vietnam to such anti-China criticism and rallies: that demonstrators were allowed and sometimes even encouraged to protest, with broad media coverage of the demonstrations and issuances of official statements in a sympathetic nature towards protesters that condemned Chinese actions. This permissive stance would continue until events escalated and turned violent, where there would then be a heavy-handed, definitive crackdown often involving arrests and brute force.

== Background ==
Major causes of popular agitation in 2018 included issues of land grabs, excessive taxes, and unfair tolls and pollution. However, the year’s largest protests was triggered by the Special Zone Act and the Cybersecurity Law. Across two weekends from 9 to 17 June 2018, members of the public gathered to protest against the passing of both laws. Protests began in Ho Chi Minh City and Hanoi but soon spread to towns in six provinces including Danang, Nha Trang, Binh Thuan, and Tai Ninh. Mainstream and mass media, which are all state institutions by law, provided minimal information or coverage of the 2018 protests, intentionally using vague terms such as “gathering” or “traffic congestion” to downplay any significant social instability.

While the demonstrations were generally peaceful in most cities, there were incidents of violence and destruction in the Binh Thuan province, where protesters stormed government buildings, set vehicles on fire, and grappled with police forces. According to a source from Reuters, the reaction was particularly bitter in Binh Thuan as anger had already been festering for years in the province – its residents blame China for assaulting local fishermen, polluting the area with a Chinese-built power plant, and deforesting the land to mine minerals primarily exported to China. Binh Thuan residents were not only venting fury towards China but also towards the local government, whom they perceived as corrupt and enslaved by destructive Chinese commercial interests.

As a facet of the protests targeted Chinese workers and Chinese-owned factories in particular, China’s diplomatic missions in Vietnam held meetings with Chinese business groups, local government and local media. The website of the Chinese Embassy in Vietnam posted that chargé d'affaires Yin Haihong “demanded” that Vietnamese authorities protect Chinese businesses and citizens. Yin said the embassy had been informed by the Vietnamese authorities that people with “ulterior motives” had “deliberately misrepresented the situation and linked it to China.”

=== Special Zone Act ===
The Special Zone Act was a draft legislation created to spark investment and economic benefits by boosting development in the areas of Van Don, North Van Phong and Phu Quoc and providing “room for institutional experiments”. Infrastructure plans included an international airport in Van Don to establish it as a tourist hub, industrial centers for the logistics and marine industries in Van Phong, and protecting the beautiful beaches and nature in Phu Qoc to attract tourists. According to scholar and Professor Alexander Vuving, the act was spearheaded by Pham Minh Chinh (who was a member of the Politburo of the CPV at the time before being appointed Prime Minister of Vietnam in 2021) and Nguyen Tan Dung (who was Prime Minister of Vietnam from 2006 to 2016), with main support coming from then-National Assembly chairwoman Nguyen Thi Kim Ngan and then-Deputy Prime Minister Vuong Dinh Hue. General Secretary Nguyen Phu Trong, then-CPV executive secretary Trần Quốc Vượng and then-Prime Minister Nguyen Xuan Phuc were reportedly more hesitant.

The specific provision that triggered the anti-China protests was a clause in the bill that would allow 99-year leases of land to foreign investors. Although the draft law did not specify any particular country, it was widely presumed that Chinese investors would be the most likely beneficiaries given their deep pockets and close proximity, potentially turning the areas into de facto Chinese territories. Vietnam has also been a preferred treasure hunting ground for Chinese buyers in recent years. Existing anti-Chinese sentiments only served to embolden this connection between the act and China. Nguyen Chi Tuyen, a Hanoi-based blogger with 42,500 Facebook followers, was quoted as saying, “We have a long history with the Chinese people, they always want to invade our country, so it is dangerous to allow them to use these SEZs to control our country”. Nguyen Quang Dy, an analyst who was a former foreign ministry official, published an article criticizing the proposed SEZs, writing: “While Vietnam’s economic interests and sovereignty in the South China Sea are seriously threatened by China, the decision to set up new SEZs at these critical positions would be inexcusable for either economic or national security reasons.”

As the rumor of China’s imminent exploitation of the act continued to spread and public dissatisfaction demonstrated, party officials hastened to rebuke such fears. Nguyen Thi Kim Ngan attempted to calm the outrage by appealing to the protesters, saying that the people should “believe in the decisions of the party and the state, especially in the fact that the National Assembly is always listening to the people’s opinions when discussing the bills”. Nguyen Phu Trong emphasized that the proposed benefits of the act would only be towards the people, proclaiming that “the party of Chairman Ho Chi Minh (referring to the CPV) is for the country, for people and no other purposes” and specifically addressing the allegations that the country would be lost to China by reportedly saying, “No one is that foolish to hand over land to foreigners for them to mess us up. No one would be that naive.”

The act eventually succumbed to pressure and was postponed indefinitely.

=== Cybersecurity Law ===
The Cybersecurity Law, on the other hand, was overwhelmingly passed on 12 June 2018 despite huge local and international opposition, with approving votes from 91% of attending legislators. The law grants the government sweeping powers to control online information and police online activity including potentially forcing technology company to hand over vast amounts of data including personal information and censoring users’ posts, and banning Internet users from organizing for anti-state purposes. Many articles are ambiguously worded and allow for broad manipulation and interpretation by authorities – Article 8 and 15 of the law, for example, could lead people to being charged for extremely vague offenses such as “negating the revolution achievement” or giving “misleading information causing confusion among the people”. Before the law was passed, the United States and Canada had urged Vietnam to delay the vote for further review to ensure that it met global standards, voicing concerns that it may hurt digital innovation in Vietnam. Critics warned that it could undermine local firms that rely heavily on the provision of cross-border services online such as cloud-computing services, which may impact the economy.

The justification provided by the CPV paints the law as a necessity for the protection of the party and the regime; as General Secretary Nguyen Phu Trong proclaimed, “During this time period of 4.0 industrial revolution, there are many benefits but, on the other hand, management is very difficult. From this come instigations, protests, disruptions, regime overthrows. Therefore, there needs to be law to protect this regime.” The Cybersecurity Law too sparked similar anti-China sentiments as it is commonly criticized as a duplicate of its Chinese counterpart passed in 2017, with Vietnam mimicking China’s approach to internet governance out of a desire to better control online spaces and information flows.

The law has been strongly criticized by nongovernmental organizations globally. Amnesty International said the law was a “devastating blow” for freedom of expression: “with the sweeping powers it grants the government to monitor online activity, this vote means there is now no safe place left in Vietnam for people to speak freely,” said Clare Algar, Amnesty’s director of global operations. Reporters without Borders urged for the quick repeal of this “draconian new law” in the online pocket of resistance that “the Party’s current leadership wants to crush”. The Asia Internet Coalition, an industry group that was leading efforts to soften the proposed legislation, said the law would increase costs of doing business in Vietnam for foreign and local enterprises, and that small and medium businesses in particular would be more negatively impacted, with lesser resources to deal with the new rigorous licensing, audit, and compliance requirements. The Vietnam Digital Communication Association said the requirements could reduce Vietnam’s gross domestic product by 1.7 percent and wipe off 3.1 percent of foreign investment.

The passing of the law can be seen as a culmination of the CPV’s existing escalating campaign against social media. Smaller individual incidents in the previous year, 2017, had been perceived as a build-up to slowly prepare for the passing of the overarching law. In early 2017, the government banned Vietnamese firms from advertising on YouTube in an effort to pressure Google to remove “toxic content” from its global video-sharing platform. The Ministry of Information and Communication later claimed success, saying that Google had removed 6,423 videos and Facebook had terminated 159 accounts for “defaming Vietnamese leaders”. In December 2017, the Ministry of Defence declared its “cyberwarfare” against the negative impact of the Internet, introducing a unit of 10,000 members entitled “Force 47” that works “every hour, every minute, every second” to fight against “erroneous views” online.

=== Role of social media ===
Social media cannot be overlooked for its two key roles in the 2018 protests: as the platform for informing and organizing, and as the very target of the Cybersecurity Law.

Social media is widely used among the Vietnamese public. In 2019, the Internet penetration rate is relatively high at about 69%. 2018 Global Digital reports show that about 60% of the population are users of social media and a survey found that Facebook was the most-used platform, with 90% of respondents between 16 and 64 years old stating that they used the platform. Studies in 2021 found that Vietnamese spend an average of 6 hours and 47 minutes each day on the Internet, with an average of 2 hours and 21 minutes on social media in specifically, higher than other Asians such as Singaporeans, Chinese, South Koreans, and Japanese.

As previously mentioned, traditional media in Vietnam is state-owned and controlled – therefore, social media is virtually the only or most practical way to reach mostly uncensored critical information and knowledge. Not only has its increased use led to better political awareness among the public about key political and economic issues, it has also enabled a mobilizational effect on policy formulation, public opinion, and overall participation in governance. Examples include campaigns from organizations such as the Institute for Studies of Society, Economy and Environment and the Centre for Community Empowerment, which has relied heavily on the social media to reach out to supporters for LGBT rights in Vietnam. Other nongovernmental organizations connect and act through networks such as the Working Group for Public Administration Reform, the People’s Participation Working Group (PPWG), and the Gender and Community Development Network, with the Internet being the main platform for communication and discussion on social issues and collective action.

Vietnam is not the only country that uses social media as a platform for organizing – this phenomenon is well-documented in literature, studies have shown that activism and political movements have often been mobilized through social media in a great number of other countries such as Egypt, Spain, Tunisia, and China. Social media as a platform allows transnational communication for spread of messages across large territories, which is crucial for large-scale mobilization – in the 2014 anti-China protests, this communication was instrumental for the organization of the factory takeovers in different places at the same time. In the 2018 Vietnam protests, the call urging people to rally circulated on social networks such as Facebook and Twitter, and many posters and activists constantly reported real-time and genuine on-the-ground events. Censorship cannot take posts down as fast as protests are covered on social media through constant updating of statuses, photos, and live videos.

With the restrictions on mainstream media, and relative freedom of social media, it is no wonder that the platform for political participation and organization is shifting. The government, of course, is more than aware that with the rise of social media comes an increase in public scrutiny – for this reason, there have been noticeable changes in how they interact with the public. A majority of the 18,000 journalists licensed by the state have active personal Facebook accounts and then-Minister of Health Nguyen Thi Kim Tien and the Office of the Government of Vietnam were among the pioneers of the use of Facebook accounts to promote their activity to the public.

The 2018 protests too have left their own footprints on government activity on social media. A study that reviewed the social media activity of the Vietnamese government and society, as well as subsequent government responses towards anti-China protests in 2018, found that the 2018 protests left significant imprints on government design and use of social media as a tool to deal with anti-China sentiments – since then, the authorities have become acutely sensitive and even responsive to anti-China sentiments online.

Overall, the adoption of the Cybersecurity Law indicates how social media and the online space in general have become urgent concerns for the CPV. The very fact that the Special Zone Act was postponed under public pressure while the Cybersecurity Law was still adopted despite significant dissent suggests that the CPV regards the medium as a major battleground.

== Timeline of events ==
9-10 June (Saturday and Sunday): The demonstrations began with around 50,000 Vietnamese from a footwear factory taking to the streets of Ho Chi Minh City to protest against the two draft bills. This soon spread across provinces in Vietnam. State media reported that protesters in the central province of Binh Thuan threw petrol bombs and bricks at police and damaged local government offices (reportedly the provincial People’s Committee headquarters) and vehicles. Dozens of policemen were injured in the incident.

Posts by activists on social media reported police beatings and detentions by plainclothes officers. Riot police used tear gas, smoke bombs, and water cannons to disperse protesters in Binh Thuan province, and arrested over a hundred people. In the capital Hanoi, police detained more than a dozen protesters who marched down a busy street, some carrying anti-Chinese banners including one that said “No leasing land to China even for one day”. Dozens of protesters were also detained in the country’s economic hub, Ho Chi Minh City. Some protesters, including Đinh Thị Thu Thủy, were temporarily detained and beaten before being fined and released.

An American citizen who took part in the protests in Ho Chi Minh City, Will Nguyen, was among the arrested. He had posted a series of tweets documenting the protests on Sunday. According to a statement from his family and friends, he was “beaten over the head and dragged into the back of a police truck” as the police cracked down on the protests. A spokesman for the United States Embassy in Hanoi said that the embassy were aware of the arrest and would work to provide the appropriate consular assistance.

11 June (Monday): Protests in the cities were quickly suppressed, but those in Binh Thuan continued. Police formed barricades with their shields across town roads and tear gas was fired into the crowd. Police arrested another 100 people on the night of 11 June, and it was unclear how many protesters from the weekend were released.

12 June (Tuesday): State media reported on Tuesday that tensions in Binh Thuan province had subsided. The government regained control of government buildings occupied over the previous weekend. The police-run Ministry of Public Security continued investigations and released a statement that those who had incited people to vandalize and cause disorder would be dealt with strictly.

15 June (Friday): On Friday, then-house speaker Nguyen Thi Kim Ngan responded vaguely to statements about the protests, saying that the legislature “appreciates the people’s patriotism and their profound concerns about important issues.”

17 June (Sunday): In central Vietnam, there were reports of peaceful demonstrations without police clashes; in southern Vietnam, reports were of violent crackdowns.

Reuters reported that in central Ha Tinh province, thousands of people demonstrated peacefully against both laws. Protesters held signs that said “No leasing land to Chinese communists for even one day” or “Cybersecurity law kills freedom”. This was confirmed by three witnesses and livestream footages on Facebook. The demonstration lasted for two hours on Sunday morning without any clashes with the police.

In Southern Vietnam however, on the same day, posts on social media and from multiple activists reported that authorities took some 180 people, including active protesters and passive observers, to Tao Dao stadium in Ho Chi Minh City. Some activists said that they were not protesting but were taken by authorities from their homes or cafes to the stadium anyway. Authorities searched and beat the detained. Many of those involved said they sustained injuries to the head, and some lost consciousness. One individual required long-term hospitalization for his injuries.

18 June (Monday): Vietnamese police arrested eight more people from Binh Thuan, accusing them of disturbing public order, opposing officials and damaging state property.

12 July: A court in Binh Thuan province jailed six Vietnamese over “disturbing public order” through their participation in the protests, with sentences of two to two and a half years each. All six had admitted guilt during the one-day trial. In the same week, then-US Secretary of State Mike Pompeo encouraged a speedy resolution regarding the issue of Will Nguyen during meetings with Vietnamese officials in Hanoi.

20 July: A Vietnamese court ordered the release and deportation of Will Nguyen immediately after his one-day trial on the same day. State-run newspaper Ho Chi Minh City Law reported that he was not given a prison sentence due to his admittance to his charged offences and sincerity. A spokesperson at the United States Embassy in Hanoi said in a statement that they were “pleased that the case of U.S. citizen William Nguyen has been resolved”. Mike Pompeo later tweeted that he was “tremendously pleased” that Nguyen would be returning home to his family.

23 July: A court in Binh Thuan province jailed another ten Vietnamese protesters, aged between 18 and 43, over “causing public disorder”, with sentences of two to three and a half years each.

2 August: Reports stated that a protester, Hua Hoang Anh, died on 2 August after local police officers in Kien Giang Province interrogated him concerning his participation in the protests. Social media and nongovernmental organizations reported that there were many injuries to his body, including to his head, neck, and belly, possibly indicating torture. State-run media only stated that he had died.

4 September: Huỳnh Trương Ca, a member of the Hiến Pháp group who organised protests in Ho Chi Minh City, is arrested. Over the next month, eight further members of Hiến Pháp are arrested.

== See also ==
- China–Vietnam relations
- 2014 Vietnam anti-China protests
- List of protests in the 21st century
