= Huỳnh Trương Ca =

Vietnamese human rights activist

Huỳnh Trương Ca (born 1971) is a Vietnamese human rights activist. The founder of the pro-democracy group Hiến Pháp, he played an organising role in the 2018 Vietnam protests; he was arrested shortly afterwards on charges of posting anti-government material on social media, and served a five-year custodial prison sentence before being released in 2024.

== Personal life ==
Ca lives in Hồng Ngự district, Đồng Tháp province, with his wife, Phạm Thanh Tâm, with whom he has at least three children.

== Activism ==
On June 16, 2017, Ca founded Hiến Pháp (lit. 'constitution'), an independent organisation that sought to promote Vietnamese people's understanding of their human rights as enshrined in the 2013 constitution. Ca stated publicly that it was not an opposition group, commenting that the Communist Party of Vietnam's official policy was to "live and work according to the constitution and the law", a policy that Hiến Pháp endorsed. Hiến Pháp remains officially unregistered in Vietnam.

Ca and Hiến Pháp rose to greater prominence through the use of social media. Ca frequently livestreamed on Facebook, where he shared his political views, and played an active role in online pro-democracy forums. Ca criticised the Vietnamese government and accused it of committing human rights violations, primarily the rights to freedom of speech and expression.

In 2018, the Vietnamese government proposed two new laws: the Cybersecurity Law, which would have granted it the power to control online information and to police online activity; and the Special Zone Act, which aimed to boost investment and development in Vietnam, including controversially by permitting leases of land to foreign investors. Ca criticised the proposed laws frequently on Facebook, and on 10 June, Hiến Pháp played a key role in arranging a public protest in Ho Chi Minh City, part of a larger series of protests that occurred nationally, including in Hanoi, Da Nang and Nha Trang.

== Arrest and imprisonment ==
In August 2018, local police in Hồng Ngự staged a conference in which they publicly criticised Ca. Ca was not at home at the time.

On September 4, 2018, Ca was arrested while travelling from Tiền Giang province to Ho Chi Minh City. Hiến Pháp had arranged a peaceful demonstration against human rights violations, systemic corruption, and the government's perceived weak response to Chinese sovereignty violations, as part of wider National Day celebrations in the city. The Investigation Agency of Đồng Tháp Province subsequently charged Ca with "making, storing, disseminating or propagandising information, materials and products that aim to oppose the State of the Socialist Republic of Vietnam" under article 117 of Vietnam's penal code. A government-run newspaper subsequently reported that Ca had used Facebook and YouTube to publish information that "fabricated and distorted" Communist Party policies and guidelines, as well as to slander local government leaders and the police. They described Hiến Pháp as being a "reactionary organisation"; Ca was among nine members of Hiến Pháp to be arrested over the month.

=== Trial ===
Ca was held in detention following his arrest. On November 14, 2018, the Investigation Agency of Đồng Tháp Province announced its decision to formally prosecute Ca, citing evidence including 40 livestreams published between March 23 and August 19, 2018 from the account "Countryside Guy", in which it was alleged that Ca had "distorted and defamed" the government. While state media reported that Ca had confessed to the charges, Ca stated he had only confessed to acts he had actually committed, which he stated were in compliance with the Vietnamese constitution.

During his detention, Ca's wife Tâm received donations from the 50k Fund, which provided financial support to the families of imprisoned activists. As a result, she was summoned for questioning by police officers in Hồng Ngự.

Ca represented himself during the trial. In December 2018, the Đồng Tháp Provincial Court sentenced him to five years and six months in prison, to be followed by three years of probation.

=== Imprisonment ===
Ca served his sentence at Xuân Lộc prison in Đồng Nai province. During his imprisonment, Ca took part in two hunger strikes, citing poor conditions and food, as well as a lack of water and medical treatment. Ca also protested authorities not delivering books that had been sent to him by his family. He reported being visited by police officers who tried to get him to identify people who had taken part in the 2018 protests.

Ca's family raised concerns around his health needs being neglected, stating that he had diagnoses of lung disease and diabetes, as well as stomach problems; they also shared he had been placed into cells with inmates who had physically assaulted him. On 19 March 2019, Amnesty International issued a public statement calling on the Prime Minister of Vietnam, Nguyễn Xuân Phúc, to release Ca. In November 2022, Ca's family reported he had still not been offered surgery as previously recommended by his doctor.

== Release ==
Ca was released from prison on 4 March 2024. Shortly afterwards, he gave an interview to Radio Free Asia in which he vowed to continue fighting for democracy in Vietnam.
