= Nguyễn Tiến Trung =

Vietnamese dissident (born 1983)

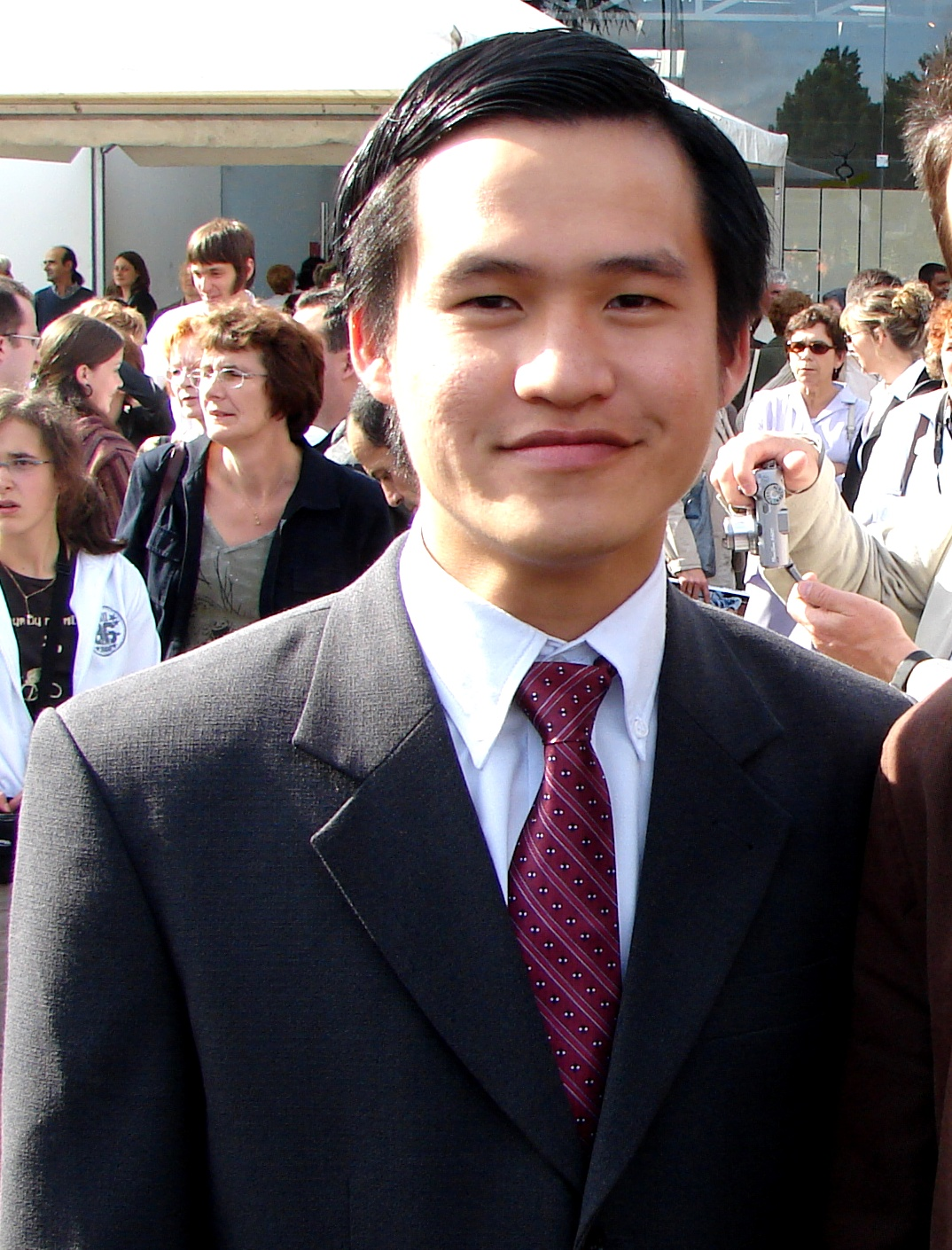
- Nguyễn Tiến Trung at the INSA graduation ceremony, (2007)
- Born: 1983 (age 42–43); Hung Ha, Vietnam
- Education: Master Degree in Information Technology
- Alma mater: INSA de Rennes
- Known for: Cyber-dissident
- Political party: Vietnam Democratic Party
- Website: http://www.taphopthanhniendanchu.org/

Nguyễn Tiến Trung (born 1983 in Hung Ha district, Thai Binh province) is a pro-democracy activist in Vietnam. As the founder and leader of the Assembly of Vietnamese Youth for Democracy Trung has been one of the outspoken political dissidents in Vietnam. He was arrested on July 7, 2009, by the public security of Vietnam for allegedly "plotting to overthrow the government of Vietnam." The accusation was persistently rejected domestically and internationally by some Vietnam analysts such as Pham Hong Son and Carl Thayer.

== Background ==
As a graduate of Ho Chi Minh City University of Technology in 2002, Trung went abroad to attend the Institut National des Sciences Appliquées (INSA) in France in 2002 and earned a Master's degree in Information Technology in 2007. It was during this interval that Trung took an interest in political activism, pushing for greater democracy in Vietnam.

== Activism ==
In a bold move in February 2006, Trung petitioned the Communist Party of Vietnam Tenth Congress, followed by a letter titled "Suggestions from an ordinary student" to the Minister of Education Nguyen Minh Hien, seeking redress in the ideologically overbearing dose of politics in Vietnam's education system. There was no official response.

On May 8, 2006, Nguyễn Tiến Trung officially founded the Assembly of Vietnamese Youth for Democracy (Tập hợp Thanh niên Dân chủ, THTNDC in Vietnamese, variously translated as "Movement of Democratic Youth" and "Democratic Youth of Vietnam"), calling for students to take part in pushing for political reforms in Vietnam. The goals set forth include disseminating democratic principles, creating a forum for the exchange of political ideas, and organizing for political activism despite the still one-party state in Vietnam.

Taking advantage of the 2006 APEC summit being hosted in Hanoi, THTNDC gathered signatures in mid-2006 petitioning the APEC leaders directly. Trung himself went to Canada seeking support from Canadian dignitaries to back the movement and the demand for democratic reforms. Furthermore, Trung met with President George W. Bush in the US and the members of the European Commission, enlisting their support.

On December 25, 2006, Nguyen Tien Trung formally submitted his application to the Vietnam Democratic Party (Đảng Dân chủ thế kỷ 21), headed by professor Hoang Minh Chinh and Nguyen Si Binh (alias: Nguyen Trong Nghia). Trung rose in this organization and was appointed deputy secretary for the party, heading up Youth Affairs.

The THTNDC in the meantime set up a new radio channel for Vietnamese youths in March 2007, broadcasting from Yahoo blog 360, twice weekly in 15–20 minute segments. In its debut broadcast, 7000 listeners tuned in.

Shortly after his return to Vietnam in 2007, Trung was called to present for military service in March 2008. According to his mother, he declined to take the Army's honor oath as he claimed it deviated from the revolutionary spirit set forth by Ho Chi Minh. Trung was dismissed from the military on 6 July 2009 but then arrested the very next day and charged with violating the 88th article of Criminal Code, allegedly for "plotting to overthrow the government of Vietnam".

His arrest followed the detention of two other dissidents, attorney Le Cong Dinh and Tran Anh Kim, a retired Army officer.

== Vietnamese response ==
After Trung's arrest, Vietnamese formed groups supporting him such as "Release Nguyen Tien Trung - say 1000s and 1000s of Vietnamese on FB". However the response to this group was not strong. There were around 1000 people in the group, which had signed a letter appealing for his freedom.

== International response ==
One day after Trung's arrest, Loretta Sanchez, member of the United States House of Representatives, officially protested the Vietnamese government's action in jailing the activists.

Political analyst Carl Thayer from the University of New South Wales noted that charges of subversion are unsubstantiated while the real intent of the Communist authorities is to silence the dissidents.

In connection with Nguyen Tien Trung detention, Reporters Without Borders, a Paris-based international non-government organization, has released an official condemnation of the arrest, asserting that while the rest of the world has its attention on protests in Iran and the riots in Xinjiang, the Vietnamese Communist government had jailed a number of pro-democracy activists who had spoken out against the state even though their efforts have been peaceful. This would set Vietnam back 10 years in terms of the democratizing process. This was followed by reports that Nguyen Tien Trung was denied access to legal counsel. While in detention Trung is under coercive physical and psychological measures to "confess". The communiqué issued by Reporters Without Borders called on the international community to pressure the Vietnamese government to live up to its signatory status in respecting human rights.

On July 14, The European Union (EU) represented by The EU Troika through the ambassadors of Sweden, Spain and The European Commission formally expressed their "grave concern" over the recent arrests of Nguyen Tien Trung and Tran Anh Kim.

Other analysts asserted that the arrests of activists like Nguyen Tien Trung are part of Vietnam's synchronizing its policy with China's current repressive stance in silencing all protest.

On August 2 Nguyen Tien Trung's supporters protested publicly at the Trocadéro, Paris in an attempt to draw more attention toward his detention. Appearing in the campaign, Professor Philippe Echard, a former head of the International Relations Department of INSA, told the BBC that he, as an educator supervising international relations issues, was extremely concerned over the arrest of Nguyen Tien Trung by the Vietnamese communist government. He called for the immediate and unconditional release of Trung.

== Vietnam's Government-published confessing video ==
In a response to the confession videotape of Nguyen Tien Trung subsequently broadcast on Vietnam's national television following his arrest, Nguyen Hoang Lan, one of members of the Democratic Party of Vietnam and the Assembly of Vietnamese Youth for Democracy, pronounced that Trung's confession, along with those of the other dissidents under detention was made under duress. The Vietnamese authorities aired the tape to "prove" Trung's complicity and counter international criticisms of his arrest.

According to a formal announcement of the Assembly of Vietnamese Youth for Democracy toward the confession tape of Nguyen Tien Trung and the other pro-democracy activists, the Assembly proclaimed the action of filming the defendant, while under investigation, appeared to be an abuse formally forbidden by law. The Assembly steadfastly articulated that no one should seem to be convicted for their crimes before an official verdict has been handed down. The Assembly called on Vietnam's government to respect the democratic processes in the legal proceedings against all of the defendants. The members of the Assembly of Vietnamese Youth for Democracy have been supporting Nguyen Tien Trung and others arrested for peaceful activism; so far their detentions have not resulted in charges or trial. The Assembly has formally made another appeal to the government for the immediate and unconditional release of the arrested activists, on the grounds of respect for Vietnam's constitution and international conventions.

He was released in April 2014 to be returned to his home under local supervision and serve the remaining three years under house arrest.

== See also ==
- Assembly of Vietnamese Youth for Democracy
- Human rights in Vietnam
