= Nguyễn Đan Quế =

Vietnamese endocrinologist and activist

- Born: 13 April 1942 (age 84); Hanoi, Tonkin, French Indochina
- Occupation: Endocrinologist
- Known for: Democracy activism and repeated imprisonment
- Awards: Robert F. Kennedy Human Rights Award (1995); Certificate of Distinction in Civil Courage (2004)

Nguyễn Đan Quế (born 13 April 1942) is a Vietnamese endocrinologist and pro-democracy activist in Saigon. He was imprisoned from 1978 to 1988, 1990 to 1998, 2003 to 2005, and briefly in 2011 on state security charges related to his activism. In 2003, The New York Times described him as "Vietnam's most renowned dissident".

== Early life ==
Quế was born on 13 April 1942 in Hanoi in northern Vietnam, then occupied by the Imperial Japanese Army. His family, including his mother and five siblings immigrated to Saigon after the Geneva Accords, fleeing communist rule in North Vietnam. He received an M.D. from the University of Saigon at age 22. In the 1960s and early 70s, he trained in Europe on a United Nations scholarship, specializing in radiotherapy.

In 1974, he joined the teaching staff at Saigon University, and the following year became the director of Cho-Ray Hospital. He had the opportunity to leave the country but chose to stay to provide medical care to the poor. However, he was removed from his post one year later for criticizing the communist regime's discriminatory health care policy. He then formed the pro-democracy group National Front for Progress. He also became Amnesty International's first member in Vietnam and began publishing two underground newspapers, "The Uprising" (Vung Day) for youth and "The People’s Uprising" (Toan Dan Vung Day) for the general public, to question the government's violations of basic human rights and to demand that the government reduce military spending and invest in the welfare of the people. In 1978, he was arrested for his continued critique of national health care policy, along with 47 associates, and imprisoned without trial; many were tortured and five died in captivity. When Quế demanded improvement in the treatment of political prisoners, he was incarcerated in a five-by-six foot cell without sanitary facilities for two months. He was sentenced for 10 years imprisonment.

== 1990–1998 imprisonment ==
Quế formed a new pro-democracy group following his arrest called the High Tide of Humanism Movement (Vietnamese: Cao Tran Nhan Ban). On 14 June 1990, he was arrested again. On 29 November 1991, after a half-hour sham trial he was sentenced to twenty years of hard labor plus five years' house arrest for treason after sending documents to Amnesty International; according to the Vietnamese national press agency, "reactionary forces used them to denigrate Vietnam" and "attempting to overthrow the people's government". Quế's family and human rights groups reported that he was assigned to hard labor despite declining health. Vietnam's foreign ministry denied the statement.

In April 1991, U.S. Senator Bob Kerrey attempted repeatedly to meet with Quế, but was refused; U.S. Senator Charles S. Robb, whose district included Quế's brother, was blocked by the Vietnamese government from meeting with Quế to bring him medicine in August 1993. Quế's case was also taken up by the European Parliament, Amnesty International, and France.

Quế was released in a 1998 general amnesty that included fellow dissident Doan Viet Hoat. Both Quế and Hoat were offered resettlement in the United States on the condition that they leave the country. Quế refused, stating that he would rather stay in prison than be forced into exile.

== Later activism ==
Quế remained in Vietnam, and on 12 May 1999, posted a statement to the Internet advocating free elections for the National Assembly. On 17 March 2003, Quế was arrested for again after he wrote a series of articles about Vietnamese media censorship, with the regime accusing him of "espionage". On 29 January 2004, the Ho Chi Minh People's Court found him guilty of "abusing democratic rights to jeopardise the interests of the state, and the legitimate rights and interests of social organisations and citizens" and sentenced to 30 months' imprisonment. On September 22, 2004, Quế was secretly sent to a hard labor camp (gulag) in Thanh Hoa Province. However, he was granted an amnesty on 31 January 2005 for Tết, the Vietnamese New Year, along with fellow dissidents Nguyen Van Ly, Nguyen Dinh Huy, and Huynh Van Ba.

In mid-February 2011, Quế posted an Internet appeal for mass demonstrations in Vietnam on the model of the Arab Spring uprisings, calling on citizens to make a "clean sweep of Communist dictatorship and build a new, free, democratic, humane and progressive Vietnam". He was then detained by the authorities for "directly violating the stability and strength of the people's government". Following a raid on his home, police reported that they had found thousands of anti-government documents in his home. A government media report stated that he had been caught "red-handed keeping and distributing documents" calling for revolution. Amnesty International named him a prisoner of conscience and called for his immediate release. On 6 March 2012, former U.S. Representative Joseph Cao organized a Vietnamese-American lobbying effort for Quế, Nguyen Van Ly, Dieu Cay, and other Vietnamese political prisoners, calling on the administration of President Barack Obama and the U.S. Congress to take a stronger stand on their behalf.

== Awards ==
In 1995, Quế was given the Robert F. Kennedy Human Rights Award by the Robert F. Kennedy Center for Justice and Human Rights. The Center praised his work "promoting greater freedom of expression and human rights in Viet Nam". In 2004, he was a finalist for the US-based Civil Courage Prize, which "honors civil courage — steadfast resistance to evil at great personal risk — rather than military valor". He ultimately won a "Certificate of Distinction in Civil Courage" and a $1,000 cash prize.

== See also ==
- Cù Huy Hà Vũ
- Thadeus Nguyễn Văn Lý
