= Trần Huỳnh Duy Thức =

Vietnamese engineer and human right activist

- Born: 29 November 1966 (age 59)
- Education: Ho Chi Minh City University of Technology
- Website: tranhuynhduythucofficial.wordpress.com

Trần Huỳnh Duy Thức (born 29 November 1966) is a Vietnamese engineer, entrepreneur, political dissident and human rights activist. He was the founder and president of EIS, an international internet and telephone line provider which was once highly regarded by both Vietnam and internationally for its achievements in the field of telecommunications and mobile services. He was arrested by Vietnamese security authorities and tried by the People's Court of Ho Chi Minh City on January 20, 2010, where he was sentenced to 16 years in prison for "activities aimed at overthrowing the people's government." He then became one of Amnesty International's prisoners of conscience. While in prison, he refused resettlement in the United States, declined to plead guilty in exchange for a pardon, and went on multiple hunger strikes in protest. On September 20, 2024, he was granted early release by the Vietnamese government.

== EIS ==
Thức opened EIS as a computer shop in 1993 which assembled its own computers, and by 1994 the brand dominated the home PC market in Ho Chi Minh City. Later on it became an internet service provider, and in 1998 became the first Vietnamese ISP to branch out from dial-up to an integrated services digital network.

EIS started providing Voice over IP services in Vietnam in 2003. They developed subsidiaries, One-Connection Singapore, One-Connection USA / Innfex, One-Connection Malaysia and One-Connection Vietnam, to provide internet access and telephone lines internationally.

One-Connection Vietnam's operation license was withdrawn following Thức's arrest.

== Activism ==
He began blogging under the pen name of Tran Dong Chan after he received no response to letters he had written to senior government officials.

In 2008 he started co-writing "Con đường Việt Nam" (English: The Path of Viet Nam), which assessed the current situation in Vietnam, with a comprehensive set of recommendations for governance reform centred on human rights.

== Arrest and imprisonment ==
He was arrested in 2009, initially for "theft of telephone wires", and later for "conducting propaganda" against the state. He made a televised confession but later recanted, saying he was coerced.

In 2010 he was tried in day-long trial alongside fellow dissidents Lê Công Định, Nguyễn Tiến Trung and Lê Thăng Long. Amnesty International called the trial "a mockery of justice" and said the "trial allowed no meaningful defence for the accused". The trial judges deliberated for 15 minutes before returning with the judgment, which took 45 minutes to read. Amnesty International said the judgement had clearly been prepared in advance of the hearing. He could have received the death penalty.

He was imprisoned for 16 years, followed by five years house arrest, for "activities aimed at subverting the people's administration". His sentence was the longest ever passed on a Vietnamese dissident. His imprisonment was condemned by British Foreign Office Minister Ivan Lewis and American ambassador Michael W. Michalak. The Office of the United Nations High Commissioner for Human Rights concluded his detention was arbitrary and requested the Vietnamese government to release him and provide compensation. Amnesty International declared him a prisoner of conscience and called for his release. He led hunger strikes in prison. He had been offered release in exchange for permanent exile, but doesn't want to leave Vietnam.

== Early Release ==
On September 20, 2024, Trần Huỳnh Duy Thức's family was informed by local police that he had been released. According to his family, at 11:43 AM on the same day, Thức landed at Tân Sơn Nhất Airport, and by 4:00 AM on September 21, he called his family to pick him up at the People's Committee Office of Ward 13, Tân Bình District.

Thức's release occurred eight months before the completion of his prison sentence. This event is seen as a move by the Vietnamese government ahead of President Tô Lâm's trip to the United States on September 21 (one day after Thức's release), aiming to ease accusations of human rights violations from the U.S. government against Vietnam.

== Personal life ==
- Thức is married with two daughters.
- Father: Trần Văn Huỳnh
- Younger brother: Trần Huỳnh Duy Tân

== See also ==
- Human rights in Vietnam
- Internet censorship in Vietnam
