= Đinh Thị Thu Thủy =

Vietnamese human rights activist (born 1982)

- Born: 5 September 1982 (age 44); Ngã Bảy, Hậu Giang province, Vietnam
- Occupation: Human rights activist
- Known for: Participation in the 2018 Vietnam protests
- Criminal charges: Propagandising against the state
- Criminal penalty: Guilty
- Criminal status: Seven years imprisonment

Đinh Thị Thu Thủy (born 5 September 1982) is a Vietnamese human rights activist and political prisoner. In 2021, she was sentenced to seven years in prison after taking part in the 2018 Vietnam protests.

== Personal life ==
Thủy lived in Ngã Bảy, Hậu Giang province, Vietnam with her daughter. She worked as an aquacultural engineer.

== Activism ==
Thủy became known as an activist on social media, particularly Facebook, where she wrote posts in support of political prisoners, freedom of expression, and environmental rights, and criticised the implications of the Vietnamese government's investment in overseas projects.

In June 2018, Thủy participated in national protests against two laws drafted by the Vietnamese government, the Special Zone Act (which promoted opening three special economic zones across Vietnam, which critics believed would lead to increasing Chinese intervention and influence in the country), and the Cybersecurity Law (which would give the government the power to control online information and police online activity). Thủy took part in a protest outside the Notre-Dame Cathedral Basilica of Saigon in Ho Chi Minh City, during which she and other protesters were temporarily detained, beaten and fined before being released. Following the protest, Thủy was placed under state surveillance.

== Arrest and detention ==
On 18 April 2020, Thủy was arrested at her home in Lái Hiếu ward, Ngã Bảy, and detained at an unknown location on charges of "making, storing, disseminating, or propagandising information, materials and products that aim to oppose the State of the Socialist Republic of Vietnam". Vietnamese authorities reported finding several masks in Thủy's home decorated with the "No-U" slogan, in reference to territorial disputes over the South China Sea.

In August 2020, Thủy's pre-trial detention was extended by an additional four months, with her location not disclosed until November, when she was able to contact her family for the first time since her arrest.

Thủy met with lawyers for the first time in December 2020, who reported her mental health as being "poor".

== Trial and sentencing ==
Thủy's trial took place on 20 January 2021 at the People's Court of Hậu Giang. She faced charges under article 117 of the penal code, which forbade "conducting propaganda against the state". Evidence used against her included "hundreds" of posts on Facebook which prosecutors stated "distorted and smeared the honour" of Vietnam's leaders, the Communist Party of Vietnam, and the country itself, in addition to "provoking oppositional thoughts" and spreading "false news" about the COVID-19 pandemic. It was alleged that Thủy operated multiple Facebook accounts. Thủy stated that she had written the posts due to her "love of her homeland" and her desire to improve Vietnam.

The trial concluded after four hours, following which Thủy was found guilty and sentenced to seven years in prison. She was transported to An Phước detention centre in Bình Dương province to serve her sentence.

In February 2021, Thủy was admitted to Hau Giang Provincial Hospital with vestibular disorder and heart valve regurgitation, in addition to calcium deficiency and insomnia attributed to poor prison conditions.

== Response ==
The Ireland-based human rights organisation Front Line Defenders issued an urgent appeal following Thủy's sentencing, expressing concern about the lack of freedom of speech in Vietnam. The United States-based Human Rights Watch called on Vietnamese authorities to stop using the law to prosecute and intimidate human rights activists in the country.

On 1 November 2021, the UN Special Rapporteur on Arbitrary Detention sent the government of Vietnam its report on human rights activists including Thủy as well as Chung Hoàng Chương, Nguyễn Văn Nghiêm, Lê Văn Dũng, Đỗ Nam Trung and Đinh Văn Hải, requesting a formal response. The government requested a two-month extension to reply.
