= Phạm Hồng Sơn =

Vietnamese dissident (born 1969)

Pham Hong Son
- Born: c. 1969
- Occupations: doctor, business manager
- Known for: democracy activism, 2002-06 imprisonment
- Spouse: Jayne R.
- Children: none yet

Phạm Hồng Sơn (born c. 1969) is a Vietnamese dissident. In 2003, he was sentenced to a 5 years imprisonment for political dissent against the government of Vietnam.

== Background ==
Sơn graduated from medical school as a physician, but then earned an MBA. He later worked as a business manager for a pharmaceutical company in Hanoi. In 2001, he became an open advocate for democracy, posting pro-democracy articles and essays to Internet forums.

== Arrest and imprisonment ==
In early 2002, he downloaded an essay from the US State Department's website titled "What is Democracy?" He then translated the essay into Vietnamese and forwarded it to friends. He also translated an essay of his own, titled "Encouraging Signs of Democracy" and originally written in French, and forwarded it to both friends and Communist Party officials.

On March 25, police searched Sơn's house and interrogated him; he was arrested without a warrant two days later. In June 2003, he was sentenced to thirteen years in prison for espionage following a half-day trial. The prosecution accused Sơn of contact with "political opportunists" and "reactionary forces overseas". According to Human Rights Watch (HRW), his wife was the only witness called, and she was only allowed to answer two yes-or-no questions.

In August, Sơn's sentence was reduced to five years' imprisonment. Foreign journalists and human rights observers were not allowed to attend either the original trial or the appeal.

== International response ==
Reporters Without Borders (RSF) condemned the imprisonment of Sơn and fellow online activists Nguyen Khac Toan and Nguyen Vu Binh stating that the men's "only crime was to express themselves freely on the Internet". On 7 April 2006, the US House of Representatives passed a resolution calling for Sơn's release as a condition of Vietnam joining the World Trade Organization. The European Union also objected on Sơn's behalf.

Amnesty International designated Sơn a prisoner of conscience and described Sơn's espionage conviction as "a travesty of justice". HRW called for his immediate release and awarded him one of its Hellman/Hammett grants, which support persecuted writers in need of financial assistance. More than 4000 Australians signed a petition calling for Sơn's release.

In 2005, RSF reported that Sơn was showing symptoms of untreated tuberculosis in prison. The Committee to Protect Journalists also expressed concerns for Sơn's well-being, stating, "The harsh conditions of Pham Hong Sơn's imprisonment add to the cruel tally of human costs in Vietnam's continued repression of the media ... Authorities should release him immediately and without condition and give him access to urgently needed medical attention as soon as possible."

In 2003, Pham Hong Son, together with Nguyen Vu Binh, Le Chi Quang and Nguyen Khac Toan, were presented with Vietnam Human Rights Award by Vietnam Human Rights Network.

== Later activism ==
Sơn was released from prison on 30 August 2006 as part of a general amnesty and placed under house arrest. The amnesty came three months in advance of Vietnam's hosting an Asia Pacific Economic Cooperation summit in Hanoi, and Sơn stated to reporters that his release had been timed to improve the nation's image before the meeting. He pledged to continue working for democratic reform.

On 5 April 2011, he was rearrested along with Le Quoc Quan when attempting to observe the trial of democracy activist Cu Huy Ha Vu. The pair were held for "causing public disorder". Sơn's wife Vu Thu Ha stated that Sơn had been assaulted by police with batons prior to his arrest. Both were released without charge 13 April.
