= Vĩnh Lợi, Cà Mau =

Vĩnh Lợi
- Ward
- Location in Vietnam
- Coordinates: 9°20′N 105°43′E
- Country: Vietnam
- Province: Cà Mau Province
- Time zone: UTC+7 (UTC+7)
- Website: http://vinhloi.camau.gov.vn/

Vĩnh Lợi is a ward (phường) in Cà Mau Province, in south-western Vietnam.

The Standing Committee of the National Assembly issued Resolution No. 1655/NQ-UBTVQH15 on the rearrangement of commune-level administrative units of Cà Mau Province in 2025 (the resolution takes effect from June 16, 2025). Accordingly, Vĩnh Lợi Commune was established in Cà Mau Province on the basis of the entire 31.98 km² of natural area and a population of 17,236 people of Châu Hưng Township, and the entire 29.71 km² of natural area and a population of 11,799 people of Châu Hưng A Commune, formerly belonging to Vĩnh Lợi District, Bạc Liêu Province.
