= Châu Thới =

- Commune and village
- Location in Vietnam
- Coordinates: 9°21′51″N 105°39′35″E
- Country: Vietnam
- Province: Cà Mau Province
- Time zone: UTC+7 (Indochina Time)

Châu Thới is a commune (xã) and village in Cà Mau Province, in south-western Vietnam.

The Standing Committee of the National Assembly issued Resolution No. 1655/NQ-UBTVQH15 on the rearrangement of commune-level administrative units of Cà Mau Province in 2025 (the resolution takes effect from 16 June 2025). Accordingly, Châu Thới Commune was established in Cà Mau Province on the basis of the entire natural area of 45.95 km² and a population of 16,910 people of Châu Thới Commune; the entire natural area of 23.04 km² and a population of 12,491 people of Vĩnh Hưng Commune; and the entire natural area of 22.55 km² and a population of 12,262 people of Vĩnh Hưng A Commune, all formerly belonging to Vĩnh Lợi District, Bạc Liêu Province.
