= Nguyễn Văn Đài =

Vietnamese activist and lawyer

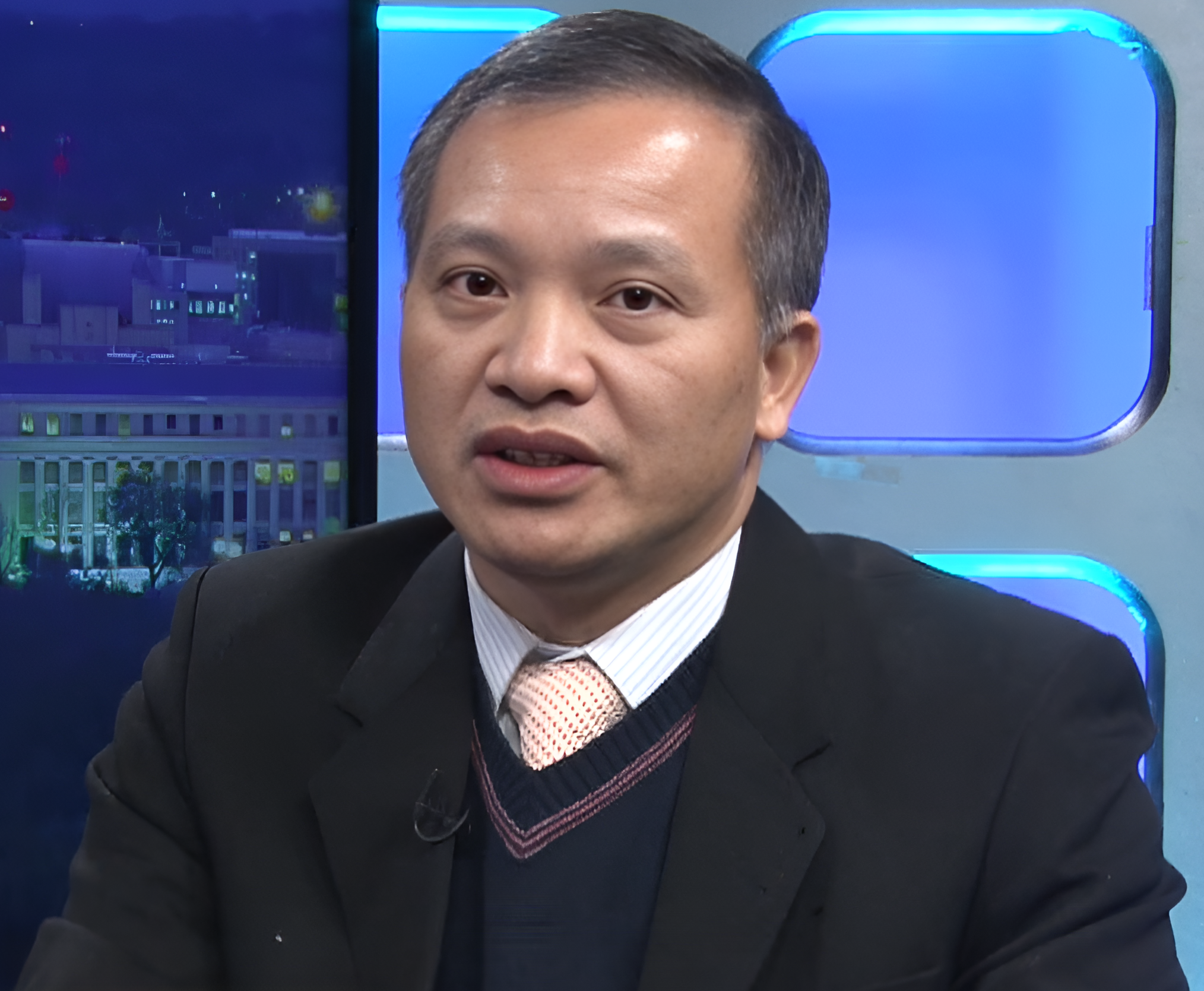
- Nguyễn Văn Đài in 2019
- Born: 1970 (age 55–56); Khoái Châu District, Hưng Yên Province, Vietnam
- Occupation: Lawyer
- Known for: Democracy activism, 2015 detention

Nguyễn Văn Đài (born 1970 in Khoái Châu District in Hưng Yên Province) is a Vietnamese human rights lawyer, democracy activist and blogger. He was arrested on December 16, 2015, by the Vietnamese authorities and charged under Article 88 for "conducting propaganda against the state". The arrest was condemned by international human rights organisations and elected representatives across the world.

On April 5, 2017, while still in the prison in Vietnam, he received from German president Frank-Walter Steinmeier the Human Rights award 2017 of German Association of Judges.

== Activism ==
In 2006, Đài founded the Committee for Human Rights in Vietnam, dedicating his life to civil empowerment through legal means with programs aimed at expanding legal networkings, building capacity for future human rights defenders and increasing legal education by disseminating and authoring publications on civil and legal rights. Through his work with the Committee for Human Rights, Đài has travelled across Vietnam to teach law students and train young human rights defenders on human rights reporting mechanisms and how to deal with police interrogation.

In May 2013, Đài also founded the "Brotherhood for Democracy", a group of mostly former jailed dissidents to co-ordinate mobilising efforts throughout Vietnam. In December 2015, the Brotherhood for Democracy organised a series of human rights forums in Hanoi and Saigon to mark International Human Rights Day. Police prevented Đài from leaving his house to attend and speak at the forum in Hanoi. Đài was beaten with wooden clubs, had his possessions taken and left stranded on a beach following training and facilitating a human rights forum in Nghe An Province the week before his arrest.

Đài was previously tried in May 2008 and sentenced to five years in prison (later reduced to four years) for "conducting propaganda against the state" (Article 88) and was forced to close his offices. He was released to four years of house arrest on March 9, 2011, and barred from practicing law. Đài concluded his house arrest in March 2015 but experienced regular police harassment, physical attacks and surveillance. Đài was the recipient of Human Rights Watch's Hellman-Hammett Award and Vietnam Human Rights Network's Human Rights Award in 2007.

== Arrest ==
Nguyen Van Đài was taken into custody in the morning of December 16, 2015. According to his wife, he was on his way with Truong Van Dung, a Hanoi-based activist, to meet with European Union representatives involved in the bilateral human rights dialogue the previous day.

Đài was taken back to his house by plainclothes police officers and was confronted by more than two dozen police officers in plainclothes and uniform. A search warrant was produced and signed by Đài and his wife. They also stated the charges which Đài did not agree to. Police confiscated several of his possessions including two laptops, a desktop computer and several USB sticks.

Since his arrest, Đài has been held in incommunicado. His wife, Vu Minh Khanh, has not been allowed to visit him but has recently been able to send supplies to him. In December attorney Ha Huy Son submitted the paperwork to be Đài's defense lawyer but was declined by the Ministry of Public Security. Currently, Đài has not been given legal representation.

On the same day, Le Thu Ha, also a member of the Brotherhood for Democracy was also arrested under article 88. She is currently being held incommunicado.

== International response ==
By letter of 18 December 2015, NGO's Lawyers for Lawyers (L4L) and Lawyers Rights Watch Canada called on the Vietnamese authorities to immediately release Nguyen Van Đài and conduct an independent investigation into the attack on him.

Furthermore, L4L requested the Delegation of the European Union to Vietnam and the Ambassadors of the EU Member States in Vietnam to visit Nguyen Van Đài in prison and to report on his condition. In a joint statement released on 6 January 2016, 26 organisations from around the world called on the Vietnamese Government to release Nguyen Van Đài.

On 13 January 2016, L4L furthermore requested the delegation to request the Vietnamese authorities that Nguyen Van Đài and his colleague are granted access to legal counsel and that their family members are allowed to visit them.

On 26 April 2016, 19 international organizations called on the President of the U.S. to use talks about the Trans-Pacific Partnership Agreement to urge Viet Nam to release political prisoners, repeal laws that criminalize the exercise of internationally protected rights and cease harassment of human rights defenders, including lawyers, in accordance with its international human rights obligations. Nguyen Van Đài was specifically mentioned in this letter.

On 14 October 2016, the UN High Commissioner for Human Rights expressed concern about Van Đài's detention and called for his release and the release of all individuals detained in connection with Article 88 and similar provisions.

In November 2016, a petition was filed with the UN Working Group on Arbitrary Detention (WGAD) urging it to intervene in the case of Nguyen Van Đài. As a result, the UNWGAD published an opinion in June 2017 ruling in favour of the petition and calling for the immediate and unconditional release of Nguyen Van Đài.

== See also ==
- Human rights in Vietnam
- 2011 crackdown on Vietnamese youth activists
- Paulus Le Son
- Ta Phong Tan
- Nguyen Van Hai
- Lê Quốc Quân
- Lê Trung Khoa
- Hồ Đức Hoà
- Đặng Xuân Diệu
- Hoàng Thị Hồng Thái
