= Hưng Hội =

- Commune and village
- Location in Vietnam
- Coordinates: 9°20′02″N 105°45′56″E
- Country: Vietnam
- Province: Cà Mau Province

Area
  - Total: 27.9 km^{2} (10.8 sq mi)

Population (1999)
  - Total: 9,768
- Time zone: UTC+7 (Indochina Time)

Hưng Hội is a commune (xã) and village in Cà Mau Province, in south-western Vietnam.

The Standing Committee of the National Assembly issued Resolution No. 1655/NQ-UBTVQH15 on the rearrangement of commune-level administrative units of Cà Mau Province in 2025 (the resolution takes effect from June 16, 2025). Accordingly, Hưng Hội Commune was established in Cà Mau Province on the basis of the entire 28.38 km² of natural area and a population of 14,748 people of Hưng Hội Commune, and the entire 34.03 km² of natural area and a population of 14,844 people of Hưng Thành Commune, formerly belonging to Vĩnh Lợi District, Bạc Liêu Province.
