= Tạ Phong Tần =

Vietnamese blogger (born 1968)

- Born: 15 September 1968 (age 57); Vĩnh Lợi District, Bạc Liêu Province, Vietnam
- Occupations: Police officer (formerly); Freelance journalist
- Organization: Free Vietnamese Journalists' Club
- Known for: Dissident blogging against the Communist Party of Vietnam
- Parents: Tưởng Năng Tiến; Đặng Thị Kim Liên
- Awards: International Women of Courage Award (2013)

Tạ Phong Tần (born 15 September 1968 in Vĩnh Lợi District, Bạc Liêu Province) is a Vietnamese dissident blogger. A former policewoman and a member of the Communist Party of Vietnam, she was arrested in September 2011 on anti-state propaganda charges. On 30 July, her mother immolated herself in front of the government offices in Bạc Liêu Province in protest of the charges against her daughter. On 24 September 2012, Tạ Phong Tần was sentenced to ten years in prison. Her arrest was protested by groups including the Office of the United Nations High Commissioner for Human Rights, the US State Department, Amnesty International, and Human Rights Watch.

Released after about 3 of 10 years of sentenced arrest and has traveled to the US, where she arrived on Saturday 20 September 2015, as US Foreign Ministry and CPJ (Committee to Protect Journalists) said.

== Blogging ==
When she began her blogging career, Tần worked as a policewoman. In 2004, she became a freelance journalist. Two years later, she started a blog titled Justice and Truth, which became popular for its reports on police abuses. Because of these reports and the criticism on the web about the policies of the Communist Party of Vietnam, she was expelled from the Party and lost her job in 2006.

Tạ Phong Tần was arrested in September 2011. She, along with fellow dissident bloggers Nguyễn Văn Hải and Phan Thanh Hải, had posted through the "Free Vietnamese Journalists' Club". The three were charged with writing anti-state propaganda. The charges carried a maximum sentence of twenty years' imprisonment. The Economist described the arrests as "the latest in a series of attempts by Vietnam's communist rulers to rein in the country's blossoming internet population."

The UN Office of the High Commissioner for Human Rights criticized the arrests, stating its concern for "what appears to be increasingly limited space for freedom of expression in Viet Nam". In a July 2012 visit to Hanoi, US Secretary of State Hillary Clinton expressed concern for the detention of the three members of the Free Vietnamese Journalists' Club. Amnesty International described the three as prisoners of conscience and urged their release. The International Federation for Human Rights and World Organisation Against Torture also released a joint statement calling on the Vietnamese government to release the three bloggers unconditionally.

== Mother's self-immolation ==
On the morning of 30 July 2012, Tần's 64-year-old mother, Đặng Thị Kim Liên, set herself on fire outside the Bạc Liêu People's Committee in protest of her daughter's detention, one week before her trial was set to begin. Lieng died of her burns en route to the hospital. The death was the first reported self-immolation in Vietnam since the 1970s.

Vietnamese state media did not acknowledge the death for several days before stating that it would investigate. An indefinite postponement was announced in Tan's trial.

The US Embassy in Vietnam stated that it was "concerned and saddened" by the news, and reiterated its calls for the bloggers' release. The US-based Committee to Protect Journalists called Lieng's death "a shocking reminder that Vietnam's campaign against bloggers and journalists exacts an unbearable emotional toll on the individuals involved." Human Rights Watch called on the international community to address the underlying human rights situation, stating, "This is not just a tragedy for one family. This is a tragedy for the whole country."

A large number of mourners journeyed to Lieng's home to pay respects in the week following her death, though many were reportedly intercepted on the roads by state security forces. The government also placed Lieng's mourners under surveillance by plainclothes police officers.

== Sentence ==
On 24 September 2012, Tạ Phong Tần was sentenced to ten years in prison in a one-day hearing that The Economist compared to a Soviet Union show trial. Prosecutors stated that the three had "distorted the truth about State and Party, created anxiety among citizens and supported schemes to overthrow the government", and the court found that they were "seriously affecting national security and the image of the country in the global arena." Phan Thanh Hai, who had pleaded guilty, was sentenced to four years' imprisonment, and Nguyen Van Hai to twelve years. The sentences were upheld by an appeals court on 28 December 2012. In 2013, the U.N. Working Group on Arbitrary Detention found Tan's detention to violate several articles of the Universal Declaration of Human Rights and the International Covenant on Civil and Political Rights.

== Awards ==
In December 2012, Tạ Phong Tần was one of 41 people to win a Hellman/Hammett award from Human Rights Watch, which recognizes writers suffering from political persecution. In December 2012, Tần, together with Phạm Thanh Nghiên and Huỳnh Thục Vy, was awarded Vietnam Human Rights Award from Vietnam Human Rights Network. In 2013, she was named a winner of the International Women of Courage Award of the US State Department. In the ceremony on International Women's Day, US Secretary of State John Kerry said of her, "For her dedication to continually demanding a better government for her people, for her willingness to take risks for her beliefs, and for her life experience and skills as a writer that serve as an inspiration to women in Vietnam, Tạ Phong Tần is a 2013 woman of courage."

== Personal life ==
Her conversion to Catholicism began due to a case where she defended 8 Thái Hà parishioners from Hanoi, after that case she began to get involved with the Redemptorists and other Catholics, being baptized on June 14, 2009 at Kỳ Đồng Church with the Christian name of Mary.
