= Thadeus Nguyễn Văn Lý =

Vietnamese Roman Catholic priest and dissident

- Born: Nguyễn Văn Lý; 15 May 1946 (age 80); Vĩnh Chấp, Vĩnh Linh, Quảng Trị Province, North Vietnam
- Occupations: Roman Catholic priest and political dissident

Thadeus Nguyễn Văn Lý (born 15 May 1946) is a Vietnamese Roman Catholic priest and dissident involved in many pro-democracy movements, for which he was imprisoned for a total of almost 15 years. For his ongoing imprisonment and continuous non-violent protest, Amnesty International adopted Lý in December 1983 as a prisoner of conscience. Most recently, his support for the Bloc 8406 manifesto has led to his sentence on 30 March 2007, for an additional eight years in prison, where he was released and then returned in 2011.

== History ==
Nguyễn Văn Lý began his dissident activities as early as the 1970s. He spent a year in prison from 1977–78, and an additional nine from May 1983 to July 1992 for "opposing the revolution and destroying the people's unity."

In November 2000, Lý gained global and official attention when members of the Committee for Religious Freedom visited him in his village, during the visit of U.S. president Clinton to Vietnam. On 17 May 2001, Lý was arrested at An Truyền church, for his alleged "failure to abide by the decisions on his probation issued by authorized State agencies". In October 2001 Lý received another prison sentence of 15 years for activities linked to the defense of freedom of expression.

In 2002, Lý was awarded the Homo Homini Award for human rights activism by the Czech group, People in Need, which he shared with Thích Huyền Quang and Thích Quảng Độ. The sentence was later reduced several times and he was finally released in February 2004.

In 2002, Lý, together with Thích Quảng Độ, received Vietnam Human Rights Award from Vietnam Human Rights Network.

As a result of international pressure, including activities of the Vatican's Center of Pastoral Apostolate for Overseas Vietnamese under the leadership of Philippe Trần Văn Hoài, Lý was released from prison in early 2004 but remains under house arrest in the Archdiocese of Huế. On 8 April 2006, he collaborated with other writers on the "Manifesto on Freedom and Democracy for Vietnam". Later, the signers of this Manifesto called themselves "Bloc 8406", referencing the date of the document.

On 15 April 2006, Lý and three other Catholic priests published the first issue of "Free Speech" (in Vietnamese: Tự Do Ngôn Luận), an underground online publication. On 8 September 2006, Lý participated in the establishment of the Vietnam Progression Party (in Vietnamese Đảng Thăng Tiến Việt Nam).

== 2007 Arrest and Sentence ==
On 19 February 2007, security police surrounded and raided Huế Archdiocese to ransack the office, confiscate computers, and arrest him. They moved him to the remote location of Ben Cui in central Vietnam, where he was under house arrest; Lý engaged in a hunger strike from 24 February to 5 March 2007. As a member of the Bloc 8406 pro-democracy movement, Lý was sentenced again on 30 March 2007 by Vietnamese provincial court judge Bùi Quốc Hiệp to eight years in prison for committing "very serious crimes that harmed national security" by trying to organize a boycott of the upcoming election.

The court appearance was televised in Vietnam, with foreign reporters allowed to attend. During the trial, when Lý tried to shout an unauthorized, dissident remark ("Đả Đảo Cộng Sản", meaning "down with communism"), he was immediately held silent with a hand over his mouth by the security officer behind him. Lý kicked the bar and repeatedly interrupted the court's proceedings with anti-communist remarks and poems. The video and image were later widely circulated on the internet. The arrest was condemned by leaders including then-United States Secretary of State Condoleezza Rice, who called the arrests a "negative development".

After Lý's arrest, U.S. Congressman Christopher Smith introduced a House Resolution to call on Vietnam to immediately and unconditionally release him and his co-accused. U.S. Congresswoman Zoe Lofgren wrote a letter to the U.S. Secretary of State to urge the US State Department to re-designate Vietnam on the US Countries of Particular Concern List due to its violations of human rights and religious freedom.

== Updates ==
According to Amnesty International, Lý may have suffered a stroke on 14 November 2009, and was moved to Prison Hospital 198. They launched a letter-writing campaign encouraging the government of Vietnam to ensure Lý can receive adequate health care in hospital and on his return to prison. He was released from prison to receive medical care on 17 March 2010, several years earlier than his original sentence.

In February 2011, Amnesty International lodged an Urgent Action to stop the Vietnamese government's intended return of Lý to detention. However, Lý was returned to prison on 25 July 2011. The State Department was "concerned" by this decision.

On 6 March 2012, former U.S. Representative Joseph Cao organized a Vietnamese–American lobbying effort for Nguyen Van Ly, Nguyen Dan Que, Dieu Cay, and other Vietnamese political prisoners, calling on the administration of President Barack Obama and the U.S. Congress to take a stronger stand on their behalf.

== See also ==
- Bloc 8406
- Nguyen Van Thuan
- Father Buu Dong
