= Nguyễn Văn Hải =

Vietnamese blogger and dissident

- Born: c. 1952
- Other names: Nguyen Hoang Hai; Dieu Cay
- Occupation: Blogger
- Organization: Club for Free Journalists
- Known for: 2008 Imprisonment
- Spouse: Duong Thi Tan

Nguyễn Văn Hải (born c. 1952; also known as Nguyễn Hoàng Hải), better known by his pen name Điếu Cày, is a Vietnamese blogger who has been prosecuted by the government of Vietnam for tax evasion and "disseminating anti-state information and materials". His imprisonment was protested by several international human rights organizations, and Amnesty International considers him a prisoner of conscience. On 21 October 2014, he was released and deported to the United States.

== Journalism ==
Nguyễn Văn Hải publishes his reporting through a blog, Dieu Cay ("Peasant's Pipe"), which also serves as his pen name. He is a founding member of the Club for Free Journalists, created in September 2007. In 2008, he participated in as well as reported on Vietnamese protests against the Beijing Olympics following a China-Vietnam maritime dispute.

== Arrest and prosecution ==
Hải was arrested on 20 April 2008 in Ho Chi Minh City, and his computers and files were confiscated. He was then charged with tax evasion and sentenced to thirty months' imprisonment.

He was scheduled for release in October 2010, but on the day of his release, his sentence was extended "pending further investigation". His home was allegedly also raided and his wife Duong Thi Tan beaten. On 5 July 2011, Duong Thi Tan was informed that Nguyễn Văn Hải had lost one of his arms due to an injury sustained in prison.

In April 2012, he was brought to an additional trial for "spreading anti-government propaganda" along with bloggers Ta Phong Tan and Phan Thanh Hải. Nguyễn Văn Hải pleaded not guilty. According to the state newspaper Thanh Nien, Nguyễn Văn Hải and Phan Thanh Hải were also believed to have attended a training seminar sponsored by the overseas opposition party Viet Tan.

=== International reactions ===
Human Rights Watch condemned the arrests and called for the immediate release of the three bloggers. In 2009, the group awarded Nguyễn Văn Hải its Hellman-Hammett Award "for writers who have suffered persecution as a result of their writings". Amnesty International designated him a prisoner of conscience, expressing concern at reports of his weight loss and deteriorating health.

On 6 March 2012, former U.S. Representative Joseph Cao organized a Vietnamese-American lobbying effort for Hải, Nguyễn Văn Ly, Nguyễn Dan Que, and other Vietnamese political prisoners, calling on the administration of President Barack Obama and the U.S. Congress to take a stronger stand on their behalf. In April, Civil Rights Defenders named him its Human Rights Defender of the Month. On 17 April, a US State Department spokeswoman called on Vietnam to release Nguyễn Văn Hải and the other bloggers, stating that the three had "done nothing more than exercise their universally recognized rights to freedom of expression". U.S. President Barack Obama said in May 2012 that "we must not forget journalists like blogger Dieu Cay, whose 2008 arrest coincided with a mass crackdown on citizen journalism in Vietnam"

In 2013, he was awarded the International Press Freedom Award of the New York-based Committee to Protect Journalists.

=== Trial and sentence ===
In September 2012, in a one-day trial of three dissidents including Ta Phong Tan and Phan Thanh Hải, Nguyễn Văn Hải received the harshest sentence of twelve years in prison. The Economist described the session as looking "very much like an old-fashioned Soviet-style show trial". Prosecutors stated that the three had "distorted the truth about State and Party, created anxiety among citizens and supported schemes to overthrow the government", while the court found that they were "seriously affecting national security and the image of the country in the global arena." Phan Thanh Hải, who had pleaded guilty, was sentenced to four years' imprisonment, and Ta Phong Tan to ten years.

Nguyễn Văn Hải's former wife, Duong Thi Tan, stated that police detained her and her son for several hours to prevent them from attending the trial.

The sentences were upheld by an appeals court on 28 December 2012.

== Release ==
On 21 October 2014, Hải was released by the Vietnamese authorities and sent to the United States.

== See also ==
- Human rights in Vietnam
- Le Quoc Quan
