= Provisional Central Government of Vietnam =

1948–49 Vietnamese anti-communist government

Provisional Central Government of Vietnam Chính phủ Trung ương lâm thời Việt‑Nam Gouvernement central provisoire du Viêt‑Nam
- 1948–1949
- Flag Coat of arms
- Motto: "Việt Nam thống nhất độc lập" ("Unite, Independent Vietnam")
- Anthem: Thanh niên Hành Khúc "The March of Youths" La Marseillaise
- Nominally recognized territory of the Provisional Central Government of Vietnam (dark green); pending territory (light green).
- Status: Transitional government within the French Union
- Capital: Hanoi (de jure); Saigon (de facto)
- Official languages: Vietnamese, French
- Religion: Folk religion Buddhism; Confucianism; Taoism; Christianity
- Chief
  - 1948–1949: Nguyễn Văn Xuân
- Historical era: Cold War
  - Preliminary Hạ Long Agreement: 7 December 1947
  - Formation: 23 May 1948
  - Hạ Long Accord: 5 June 1948
  - Élysée Accords: 8 March 1949
  - Reunification with Cochinchina: 4 June 1949
  - State of Vietnam establishment: 2 July 1949
- Currency: piastre
Preceded by
Annam
Tonkin
Cochinchina
Succeeded by
State of Vietnam
- Today part of: Vietnam

The Provisional Central Government of Vietnam (Note: French: Gouvernement central provisoire du Viêt‑Nam, Vietnamese: Chánh-phủ Trung-ương lâm-thời Việt-Nam (early), Chính phủ Trung ương lâm thời Việt-Nam (later).) was a provisional government within the French Union, proclaimed on 23 May 1948 in Vietnam during the First Indochina War. On 5 June 1948, it was recognized as an independent government by France. However, it was only created as a transitional entity partly replacing the French protectorates of Tonkin (Northern Vietnam) and Annam (Central Vietnam), until Cochinchina (Southern Vietnam) could be reunited with the rest of the country under an independent associated state within the French Union. This state would be the State of Vietnam, predecessor of the Republic of Vietnam (South Vietnam). The State of Vietnam was established by the Élysée Accords taking effect on 14 June 1949 and proclaimed on July 2, marking the end of the Provisional Central Government of Vietnam.

== History ==
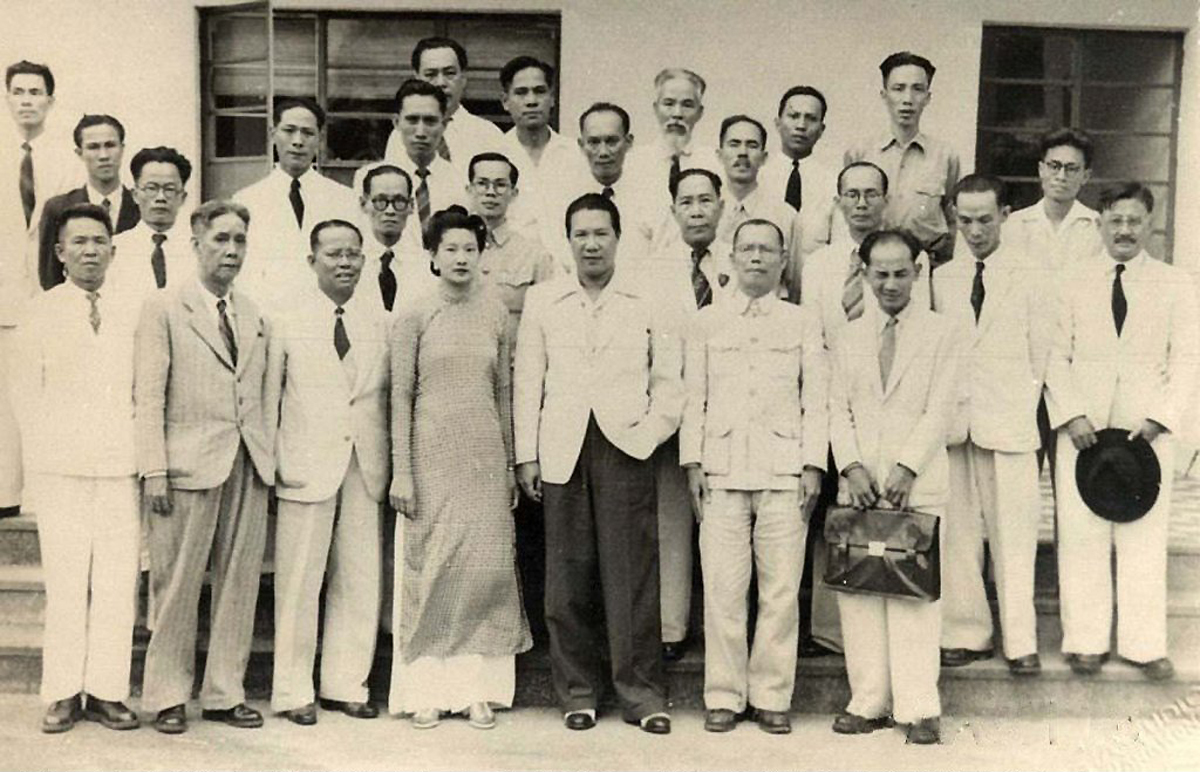
Bảo Đại with Vietnamese nationalist revolutionaries in Hong Kong, 9 September 1947.

The communist destruction of opposition parties in the summer of 1946 did little to foster reconciliation. Nationalist partisans coalesced around the former emperor Bảo Đại to enter negotiations with the French.

After a preliminary treaty on 6 December 1947, the Hạ Long Bay Accords of 5 June 1948 (Accords de la baie d’Along) recognized the independence of this government partly replacing the Tonkin (Northern Vietnam), Annam (Central Vietnam) and associated to France within the French Union and the Indochinese Federation then including the neighboring Kingdom of Laos and Kingdom of Cambodia.

However, while the participants had agreed on the reunification of Cochinchina (Southern Vietnam) with Tonkin and Annam, it had a different status from the other two territories and retained a separate administration. Former Emperor Bảo Đại, whom the French wanted to bring back to power as a political alternative to President Ho Chi Minh, insisted that all Vietnam should be reunited before he took office as "chief of State". General Nguyễn Văn Xuân, until then head of the Cochinchinese government, signed the agreements on Bảo Đại's behalf and became head of the newly formed Provisional Central Government; he was replaced by Trần Văn Hữu as president of the Cochinchinese administration. Although Vietnam was not yet reunited, and far from being autonomous, the French had agreed for the first time to include the word "independence" in the agreements. Vietnam officially became partially independent and unified as an associated state within the French Union with a treaty on 8 March 1949; that took effect on 14 June 1949, was accepted by French parliament on 29 February 1950, and was signed by French president on February 2.

During its short existence, the Provisional Central Government had very limited means, and was denounced by the communist Viet Minh as a puppet state. The Xuân government was able to create several administrative units in Northern and Central Vietnam, but it was entirely dependent on the French as it initially had no army, no police forces and – being, unlike the government of Cochinchina, unable to collect taxes – no independent financial resources. As the Indochina War raged on, the Provisional Central Government was regarded as near-impotent. Also, the French administration was still in place in Tonkin and Annam and was often reluctant to relinquish power to the new Vietnamese administration.

Moreover, the reunification of Vietnam was still hampered by the status of Cochinchina: the French colonists – who remained influential in the Cochinchinese consultative council – insisted, with the support of Southern Vietnamese autonomist politicians, that Cochinchina (then known as the Provisional Government of Southern Vietnam) was still legally a colony, since its status as an "autonomous Republic", proclaimed in 1946, had never been ratified by the French National Assembly, and that any process of reunification had therefore to be approved by the French Parliament. Xuân tried to reunite Cochinchina with his government through a by-law, but it was overruled by the colony's council. Trần Văn Hữu's administration therefore remained in existence and Vietnam found itself with two governments, each backed by the French, one claiming sovereignty over the whole country, and one administrating the Southern region.

Gradually, the Vietnamese provisional government was given the means to establish armed forces. On 1 January 1949, it army was officially created under French supervision. It initially numbered 25,000 troops, including 10,000 irregulars. It would become the Vietnamese National Army on 8 December 1950.

The Vietnamese situation remained deadlocked for over a year, as Bảo Đại refused to return to Vietnam and take office as head of state until the country was fully reunited. Finally, the French National Assembly voted a law set to create a Cochinchinese territorial assembly which would replace the former council. The new assembly was elected on 10 April 1949, and the Vietnamese became a majority. On 23 April, the Cochinchinese assembly approved the merger with the Provisional Government, and its decision was in turn approved by the French National Assembly on May 20. On June 4, Cochinchina and the "associated State of Vietnam" were formally merged, and the State of Vietnam was then officially proclaimed on July 2.

== Cabinet ==
- Chief: Nguyễn Văn Xuân
- Deputy chief: Trần Văn Hữu (Note: Also the Minister-President of the Autonomous Republic of Cochinchina.)
- Minister of Justice: Nguyễn Khắc Vệ
- Minister of Rites and Education: Nguyễn Khoa Toàn
- Minister of Economy and Finance: Nguyễn Trung Vinh
- Minister of Information, Press, and Propaganda: Phan Huy Đán
- Minister of Agriculture: Trần Thiện Vàng
- Minister of Health: Đặng Hữu Chí
- Minister of Public Works and Planning: Nguyễn Văn Tỷ
- Minister of Defense: Trần Quang Vinh
- Minister of the Deputy Chief's Office: Đinh Xuân Quảng
- Secretary of State for Northern Region: Nghiêm Xuân Thiện
- Secretary of State for Central Region: Phan Văn Giáo
- Secretary of State for Southern Region: Lê Văn Hoạch

== See also ==
- 1947–1950 in French Indochina
- History of Vietnam
