= Nguyễn Văn Xuân =

Vietnamese general and politician (1892–1989)

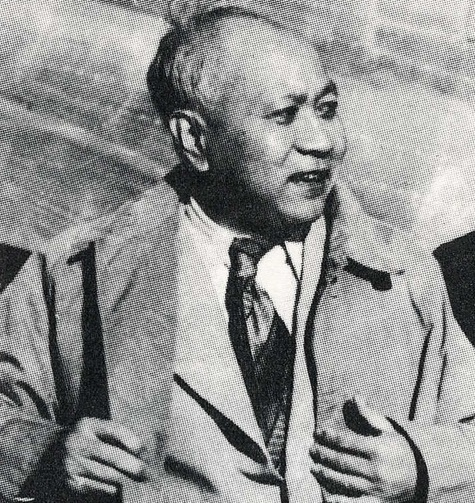

Deputy Prime Minister of the State of Vietnam
- In office 6 July 1954 – 24 September 1954
- Prime Minister: Ngô Đình Diệm
- Preceded by: Nguyễn Trung Vinh
- Succeeded by: Trần Chánh Thành
- In office 1 July 1949 – 20 January 1950
- Prime Minister: Bảo Đại
- Preceded by: Position established
- Succeeded by: Phan Huy Quát

Chief of the Provisional Central Government of Vietnam
- In office 5 June 1948 – 12 June 1949
- Deputy: Trần Văn Hữu
- Preceded by: Position established
- Succeeded by: Bảo Đại (as Chief of the State of Vietnam)

3rd President of the Autonomous Republic of Cochinchina
- In office 8 October 1947 – 27 May 1948
- Deputy: Trần Văn Hữu
- Preceded by: Lê Văn Hoạch
- Succeeded by: Trần Văn Hữu

Deputy President of the Autonomous Republic of Cochinchina
- In office 1 June 1946 – 8 October 1947
- President: Nguyễn Văn Thinh; Lê Văn Hoạch
- Preceded by: Position established
- Succeeded by: Trần Văn Hữu

Personal details
- Born: 3 April 1892 Trường Thọ, Gia Định Province, French Cochinchina
- Died: 14 January 1989 (aged 96) Nice, Alpes-Maritimes, France
- Party: Military
- Education: École Polytechnique

Military service
- Branch/service: French Army
- Years of service: 1947–1954
- Rank: Brigadier general
- Battles/wars: French Indochina War

Nguyễn Văn Xuân (Vietnamese pronunciation: [ŋwiən˦ˀ˥ van˧˧ swən˧˧]; 3 April 1892 – 14 January 1989) was a Vietnamese general and politician who served as prime minister of Cochinchina from 1947 to 1948, then prime minister of the Provisional Central Government of Vietnam from 5 June 1948 to 20 June 1949, during the First Indochina War.

== Early life ==
Nguyễn Văn Xuân was born in Trường Thọ on 3 April 1892, to Nguyễn Văn Cua. His father was a school teacher and civil servant in Saigon. He was admitted to the École polytechnique on 18 September 1912, and was its first Vietnamese student. Xuân was one of a few Vietnamese people to acquire French citizenship.

== Career ==
=== Military ===
Xuân was a second lieutenant in the French military during World War I, and participated in the Battle of Verdun. On 21 April 1916, he was awarded the Croix de Guerre. He rose to become a captain in 1922, major in 1928, and lieutenant colonel in 1934. During World War II he served in France from 1939 to 1940, and was sent to Indochina after the Armistice of 22 June 1940. He declined to serve as minister of war for the Empire of Japan's puppet state Empire of Vietnam. He was sent to a prisoner of war camp in Hanoi.

Xuân was promoted to brigadier general and awarded the Legion of Honour in 1947; he was the first Vietnamese person to hold the rank of general in the French army. He was promoted to major general on 4 May 1949.

=== Politics ===
Xuân served as vice president and minister of national defence of French Cochinchina. He succeeded Lê Văn Hoạch as president of French Cochinchina and oversaw the transition into Provisional Central Government of Vietnam. High Commissioner Émile Bollaert and Xuân signed a joint declaration on 5 June 1948, in which France recognsied Vietnam's independence and Vietnam being an associate state of the French Union.

Bảo Đại, as chief of state and prime minister, appointed Xuân as deputy vice premier of minister of defence on 1 July 1949. Phan Huy Quát succeeded Xuân as minister of defence.

Prime Minister Ngo Dinh Diem appointed Xuân as deputy prime minister and minister of defence on 17 September 1954. However, Xuân resigned as deputy prime minister of 26 September, but retained his position as minister of defence and was also appointed as minister of the interior. Bảo Đại ordered Diem to placed Xuân, Nguyễn Văn Hinh, and Lê Văn Viễn into his cabinet on 1 October 1954; Xuân was to return as deputy prime minister.

The Committee for the Defence of the Peace supported unity between North and South Vietnam and wanted elections in July 1956. It was suppressed by the government, which accused it of being a communist organisation. Around 150 people, including Xuân, signed a petition protesting this action.

== Death ==
Xuân retired to France, first in Touraine and then to Nice. He died in Nice, France, on 14 January 1989.

== See also ==
- State of Vietnam

== Works cited ==
=== Books ===
- Chan, Sucheng, ed. (2006). The Vietnamese American 1.5 Generation: Stories of War, Revolution, Flight and New Beginnings. Temple University Press. ISBN 1592135005.
- Tran, Nu-Anh (2022). Disunion: Anticommunist Nationalism and the Making of the Republic of Vietnam. University of Hawaiʻi Press. ISBN 9780824887865.

=== Journals ===
- "Chronology of International Events". Chronology of International Events. 10 (19). Chatham House: 609–648. 1954. doi:10.2307/40545405. JSTOR 40545405.
- "Trial of Strength in Indo-China: The Bao Dai Experiment". The World Today. 6 (3). Chatham House: 127–138. 1950. doi:10.2307/40392308. JSTOR 40392308.
- Hammer, Ellen (1950). "The Bao Dai Experiment". Pacific Affairs. 23 (1). University of British Columbia: 46–58. doi:10.2307/2753754. JSTOR 2753754.
- Jumper, Roy (1956). "The Communist Challenge to South Viet Nam". Far Eastern Survey. 25 (11). Institute of Pacific Relations: 161–168. doi:10.2307/3024196. JSTOR 3024196.
- Smith, R. (1972). "The Vietnamese Élite of French Cochinchina, 1943". Modern Asian Studies. 6 (4). Cambridge University Press: 459–482. doi:10.2307/311543. JSTOR 311543.

=== Web ===
- Valéry, Maurice (1989). "Le Général Nguyen Van Xuan" [The General Nguyen Van Xuan] (PDF) (in French). Association Nationale des Anciens d'Indochine et du Souvenir Indochinois. Archived from the original (PDF) on 23 October 2016.

Political offices
Preceded by Position established	Deputy Prime Minister of the Autonomous Republic of Cochinchina; 1946–1947	Succeeded by Trần Văn Hữu
Preceded by Lê Văn Hoạch	Prime Minister of the Autonomous Republic of Cochinchina; 1947–1948	Succeeded by Position abolished
Preceded by Position established	Chief of the Provisional Central Government of Vietnam; 1948–1949	Succeeded by Position abolished
Preceded by Position established	Deputy Prime Minister of the State of Vietnam; 1949–1950	Succeeded by Phan Huy Quát
Preceded by Nguyễn Trung Vinh	Deputy Prime Minister of the State of Vietnam; 1954	Succeeded by Trần Chánh Thành
