= Bình Xuyên Force =

Binh Xuyen Force Bộ đội Bình Xuyên
- War standard.
- Active: 1945–1960
- Country: (North Vietnam) Democratic Republic of Vietnam; Cochinchina; South Vietnam
- Allegiance: Bảo Đại; Lê Văn Viễn
- Type: Paramilitary force, Criminal organization
- Role: Private army
- Part of: Vietminh (until 1948); Vietnamese National Army (until 1955)
- Nicknames: Binh Xuyen Group; Binh Xuyen Force; Binh Xuyen Volunteer Police
- Motto: Honor – Fatherland
- Colours: Red, blue, yellow
- Engagements: World War II; Civil conflicts in Vietnam (1945-1949); August Revolution; War in southern Vietnam (1945-1946); First Indochina War; 1955 South Vietnamese conflict; Battle of Saigon (1955)

Commanders
- Notable commanders: Dương Văn Dương; Huỳnh Văn Trọng; Dương Văn Hà; Võ Văn Môn; Lê Văn Viễn; Thái Hoàng Minh; Nguyễn Văn Hiểu

Bình Xuyên Force (Vietnamese: Bộ đội Bình Xuyên, IPA: [ɓɨ̂n swiəŋ]), often linked to its infamous leader, General Lê Văn Viễn (nicknamed "Bảy Viễn"), was an independent military force within the Vietnamese National Army whose leaders once had lived outside the law and had sided with the Việt Minh. During its heyday, Bình Xuyên funded itself with organized crime activities in Saigon while effectively battling Communist forces.

== History ==
=== Formation ===
Bình Xuyên groups first emerged in the early 1920s as a loosely organized coalition of gangs and contract laborers about two hundred to three hundred strong, it was named after the eponymous hamlet of Chánh Hưng, Saigon (now is part of Rạch Ông Ward, District 8, Ho Chi Minh City). Bình Xuyên's early history consisted of cycles of kidnapping, piracy, pursuit, and occasionally imprisonment. One of the gang leaders was Ba Dương, a kingpin in the Saigon–Cholon area. His lieutenants included Huỳnh Văn Trí (a.k.a. Mười Trí), Dương Văn Hà (a.k.a. Năm Hà), Võ Văn Môn (a.k.a. Bảy Môn), and Lê Văn Viễn (a.k.a. Bảy Viễn). Bình Xuyên's history is largely that of two separate groups: Ba Dương's troops (the Bộ Đội Bình Xuyên) and Bảy Viễn's Bình Xuyên.

=== 1920s–1930s ===
From the 1920s to the mid-1930s, Nhà Bè was a haven for hundreds of armed gangs led by several leaders. Some were groups of gangsters picking on the helpless, while others robbed the rich, reportedly, to help the poor. Some of the well-known gangsters at the time included:

- Trần Văn Dõi (a.k.a. Sau Dõi) was notorious for his protection services. In 1940, he bribed port officials for sole protection of a lumberyard used by a pro-Japanese shipbuilding company in South Vietnam.
- Trần Văn Thọ (a.k.a. Sau Thọ)'s gang concentrated on kidnapping and extortion of rich families.
- Đoàn Văn Ngọc (a.k.a. Ba Ngọc) and his brother, Đoàn Văn Gin (a.k.a. Ba Gin) operated brothels and provided protection to independent prostitutes in the Tân Thuận area.
- Nguyễn Văn Mạnh (a.k.a. "Tám Mạnh"), a martial arts teacher, started the first organized crime unit in Saigon. In 1940, after joining the Communist Party, Mạnh ordered his gang to cease all criminal activities and concentrate on helping the party in an upcoming uprising. He later brought his gang to join Ba Dương's Bình Xuyên troops.

=== Ba Dương's Bình Xuyên (1940–1946) ===
Dương Văn Dương (a.k.a. "Ba Dương") was born in 1900 to a family of poor peasants from Bến Tre. His mother remarried after his father's death and the family moved to Nhà Bè in the late 1920s, where Dương grew up to be a respected martial arts teacher. In 1936, Dương started his criminal activities by providing protection services to the Tây Ninh-Phnom Penh bus station in Saigon. By 1940, he had become a kingpin of Cochinchina. In 1943, Dương joined the Communist party. In 1945, he stole weapons from the Japanese to arm his troops in order to fight the returning French forces. His Bộ Đội Ba Dương was reportedly one of the groups most feared by local French-trained militia. In 1945, the 2,000 armed men under different leaders in the Nhà Bè area elected Dương their commander. Together they chose to name the newly formed unit, the "Bình Xuyên Troops" (Vietnamese: Bộ Đội Bình Xuyên).

=== From outlaws to revolutionaries ===
In late 1929, after the formation of the southern Communist committee, Ngô Gia Tự ordered Châu Văn Ký to infiltrate the ranks of workers and manual laborers in Nhà Bè. By 1940, Ký, with Nguyễn Văn Trân (a.k.a. Bảy Trân) enlisted gang leaders and their members, one of the most prominent was Tam Manh. After the botched southern uprising (Vietnamese: Khởi nghĩa Nam Kỳ or Nam Kỳ khởi nghĩa), the French colonial authorities brutally suppressed all opposition groups.

On 24 September 1945, Lê Văn Khôi (a.k.a. "Ba Nhỏ"), one of Ba Dương's lieutenants allegedly organized the massacre of 150 French and Eurasian civilians, including children, in Saigon without order from its leader. While this decision would have been of little consequence in Tonkin or central Vietnam, where the Communist-dominated Việt Minh was strong enough to stand alone, in Cochin China, where the Bình Xuyên support was crucial, Ba Nho's action led to suppression from the returning French troops. The Cochin division of the Indochina Communist party (Vietnamese: Đông Dương Cộng sản Năm Bộ) was weakened by mass arrests and executions. A decision was made by the southern communist committee to put Ba Nhỏ on trial. Ba Nhỏ was tricked by Nguyễn Binh into returning to Phước Lai, Long Thành district (now is Hiệp Phước, Nhơn Trạch district, Đồng Nai) where he was found guilty and sentenced to death. Ba Nhỏ requested to be allowed to take his own life, which was granted.

In September 1945, Southern Communist party leaders (Trần Văn Giàu, Nguyễn Văn Trân, et al.) put Ba Dương in charge of the guerrilla forces attacking southern Saigon, more commonly referred as Front number 4. For two months, Bình Xuyên troops relentlessly attacked and overran several French military facilities and posts. Dương's group eventually lost to the more disciplined and better-trained French Union troops.

On 20 November 1945, to avoid being decimated by French counter-attacks, Bình Xuyên troops withdrew to Rừng Sác to regroup for future military operations. In the next few months, Bình Xuyên troops expanded their operations toward the west of South Vietnam (Zone 8). During these few months, they successfully took control of Gò Công, Mỹ Tho and Bến Tre, the last province being where they established their new base. Ba Dương, newly promoted by General Nguyễn Binh in September to Deputy Commander of Zone 7, died in an air attack on 16 February 1946. Without Dương, his lieutenants began to disagree with each other on who would be the troops' new commander. Nguyễn Bình, who had unsuccessfully tried to kill Bình Xuyên's new strongman, Lê Văn Viễn (a.k.a. Bảy Viễn), would later step in to disband the Bình Xuyên in 1948.

=== Bình Xuyên divided ===
After Ba Dương's death, his lieutenants split into three groups:

- Supporters of Ba Dương's half-brother, Dương Văn Hà (a.k.a. Năm Hà)
- Backers for Lê Văn Viễn (a.k.a. Bảy Viễn) in his bid to become the new commander.
- Those who remained neutral in the power struggle.

In April 1946, Military Zone 7 appointed Năm Hà as the Bình Xuyên's new commander. Bảy Viễn, upset with the decision, formed the Bình Xuyên Interzone with leaders and troops from 7 units. Despite the schism, Bình Xuyên remained united in the fight against the French. As Bảy Viễn's reputation grew, Nguyễn Binh gave the order to kill Viễn and suppressed his supporters. With two trusted companies, Viễn fought his way out of an assassination setup and surrendered to Savani, head of the Deuxième Bureau/SDECE in Cochinchina. In June 1948, Bảy Viễn became colonel in charge of the Bình Xuyên Auxiliary Forces, temporarily reporting to Trần Văn Hữu, Deputy Premier in the provisional government of Vietnam and Governor of Nam Phan.

French officials in South Vietnam gave Viễn full control of Sài Gòn–Chợ Lớn under stipulation that he wipe out the city's Communist infrastructure. Bảy Viễn's knowledge of the Việt Minh and his desire to destroy Nguyễn Binh's troops in Saigon enabled him to destroy Communist forces in a very short time. The French colonial government rewarded Bình Xuyên's success by allowing Bảy Viễn to monopolize the trucking industry in South Vietnam and allowing the kingpin to operate as a warlord. Bảy Viễn was promoted to major general after the operation to clear Route 15.

=== Partition of Vietnam and rise to power ===
In 1949, Emperor Bảo Đại became the head of state of the newly formed State of Vietnam. To solve the problem of having to spread the Vietnamese National Army too thin in the war against the Viet Minh, he decreed all non-communist military forces in the country as independent armies within the conventional army. Bảy Viễn was given the rank of major general of the Vietnamese National Army and his troops became the QDQG Bình Xuyên, which was a self-funded army with revenues from legally-run brothels and casinos; Bảy Viễn forcibly took control of the casinos from Macanese organized crime groups.

General Viễn made arrangements with Bảo Đại giving them control of their own affairs in return for their nominal support of the regime, just as he had done so with the French colonial government. In March 1955, the group joined the Cao Đài and Hòa Hảo in forming a "United Front of the National Forces."

=== Demise ===
At the time of the short war in 1955 between the VNA Bình Xuyên and the regular VNA, Viễn had five regular infantry battalions and two battalions of Public Security Shock Troops (Vietnamese: Công an xung phong). Bình Xuyên's paramilitary forces were mostly wiped out by the VNA under the command of Dương Văn Minh in Operation Rung Sat in 1955. Bảy Viễn, the leader of the organization, was exiled to Paris after his unsuccessful attempt to take power from Prime Minister Ngô Đình Diệm in May 1955. Major Lê Paul, Bảy Viễn's son, was brutally killed after Dương Văn Minh (a.k.a. "Big Minh") failed to demand a ransom from Bảy Viễn.

== See also ==
- Hòa Hảo
- Cao Đài

== Bibliography ==
- AFRVN Military History Section J-5, Strategic Planning and Policy (1977) [1966]. Quân Sử 4: Quân lực Việt Nam Cộng Hòa trong giai-đoạn hình-thành: 1946-1955 [Military History Volume 4:AFRVN, the formation period, 1946-1955] (in Vietnamese). Taiwan: DaiNam Publishing. pp. 408–28.
- Ho Son Dai (2008). Bo Doi Binh Xuyen [Binh Xuyen Force] (in Vietnamese). HCM City.
- Lucien Bodard (1977). La guerre d'Indochine [The Indochina War] (in French). Hachette. ISBN 2-246-55291-5.
- Pierre Darcourt (1977). Bay Vien, le maitre de Cholon [Bay Vien, Cholon's Master] (in French). Hachette. ISBN 978-2-01-003449-7.
- Huynh Kim Khanh, "Background of the Vietnamese August Revolution", The Journal of Asia Studies 25, no. 4 (August 1971)
- Alfred W. McCoy (2003). The Politics of Heroin. Lawrence Hill Books. ISBN 1-55652-483-8.
- Nguyên Hùng (2005). Bảy Viễn Thủ Lĩnh Bình Xuyên [Bay Vien, Binh Xuyen's Leader] (in Vietnamese). Cong An Nhan Dan Viet Nam - Vietnamese People's Public Security.
- Simpson, Howard R. (August 1992). Tiger in the Barbed Wire: An American in Vietnam, 1952-1991. Brassey's Inc. ISBN 0-7881-5148-7.
- Simpson, Howard R. (1998). Bush Hat, Black Tie: adventures of a foreign service officer. Brassey's Inc. ISBN 1-57488-154-X.
- Truong Nhu Tang (1985). A Vietcong Memoir. Harcourt Brace Jovanovich. p. 63. ISBN 0-15-193636-6.

== Newsreel ==
- Indochina: Saigon after the combats (rushes) French news archives, ORTF, 10 May 1955
