= Bình Nguyễn =

Bình Nguyễn may refer to:

- Nguyễn Bình, a Lieutenant-General of Việt Minh
- Nguyễn Thị Bình, former Vice President of Vietnam (1992–2002)
