= War in southern Vietnam (1945–1946) =

Prelude to the Indochina Wars (1946–1991)

War in Southern Vietnam
- Part of the aftermath of World War II and the Indochina wars
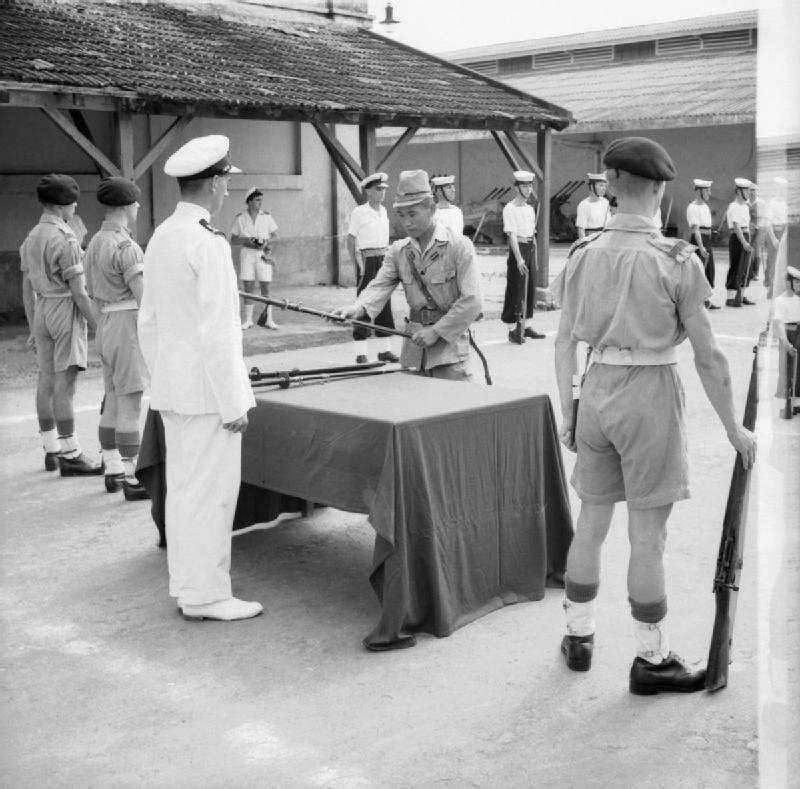
- A Japanese naval officer surrendering his sword to a British naval lieutenant in Saigon on 24 November 1945
Date	23 September 1945 – 30 March 1946 (6 months and 1 week)
Location	Vietnam south of the 16th parallel
Result	Franco-British victory; Viet Minh withdraws to the countryside; Fracture between the Viet Minh and non-communist nationalists intensifies; France reoccupies Cochinchina and southern Annam; Cochinchina becomes an autonomous republic; Ho–Sainteny Agreement; First Indochina War begins

Belligerents
British Empire; United Kingdom; India; France Japanese Surrendered Personnels	Southern Resistance Committee of Viet Minh; Vanguard Youth; National Guard; Southern Provisional Administrative Committee; Vietnam People's Army; Pro-Viet Minh Bình Xuyên	Hòa Hảo; Cao Đài; Vietnamese National Independence Party; Đại Việt Nationalist Party Trotskyists

Commanders and leaders
Douglas Gracey; Philippe Leclerc	Hồ Chí Minh; Võ Nguyên Giáp; Trường Chinh; Nguyễn Bình; Trần Văn Giàu; Lê Duẩn; Phạm Ngọc Thạch; Dương Văn Dương †; Lê Văn Viễn	Huỳnh Phú Sổ; Phạm Công Tắc; Hồ Văn Ngà (executed); Nguyễn Tôn Hoàn Tạ Thu Thâu (executed); Phan Văn Hùm (executed)

Strength
Unknown number of soldiers	Unknown number of soldiers	At least 15,000 Hòa Hảo militants Unknown number of Cao Đài and VNQDD forces Some 2,500 Bình Xuyên forces

Casualties and losses
40 dead "Slightly higher than British casualties"	British estimation: 2,700 dead (600 by British forces, the rest by French and Japanese)	Unknown

The 1945–1946 War in Southern Vietnam, codenamed Operation Masterdom by the British, and also known as the Southern Resistance War (Vietnamese: Nam Bộ kháng chiến) by the Vietnamese, was an armed conflict in Vietnam south of the 16th parallel during which British-Indian and French forces fought to suppress Vietnamese independence movements, which included non-communist nationalists, Trotskyists, and the Stalinist-front Viet Minh, to take control of the southern half of the country. It began shortly after the end of World War II, specifically the unconditional surrender of Japan.

Starting in Saigon on 23 September, the British began facilitating the return of the French to the half of Indochina south of the 16th parallel. Almost all Vietnamese opposed the French return in August 1945, but the Viet Minh's killings of non-communist opponents eventually pushed some groups to join the French in fighting against the Viet Minh. By March 1946, British–French forces had defeated the Vietnamese resistance, allowing the French to reassert control over southern Vietnam. Later, failed negotiations and rising tensions in the north escalated into the full-scale First Indochina War.

== Background ==
In July 1945 at Potsdam, Germany, the Allied leaders made the decision to divide Indochina in half—at the 16th parallel—to allow Chiang Kai-shek to receive the Japanese surrender in the North, while Lord Louis Mountbatten would receive the surrender in the South. The Allies agreed that France was the rightful owner of French Indochina, but because France was critically weakened as a result of the German occupation, a British-Indian force was installed in order to help the French Provisional Government in re-establishing control over their former colonial possession.

After Japan surrendered when Emperor Hirohito announced the capitulation on 15 August, Mountbatten, Supreme Allied Commander of the Southeast Asia Command, was to form an Allied Commission to go to Saigon and a military force consisting of an infantry division that was to be designated as the Allied Land Forces French Indochina (ALFFIC). It was tasked to ensure civil order in the area surrounding Saigon, to enforce the Japanese surrender, and to render humanitarian assistance to Allied prisoners of war and internees.

The concern of the Allies' Far Eastern Commission was primarily with winding down the Supreme Headquarters of the Imperial Japanese Army Southeast Asia and rendering humanitarian assistance to prisoners of war. Major-General Douglas Gracey was appointed to head the Commission and the 80th Brigade, commanded by Brigadier D. E. Taunton, of his 20th Indian Division was the ALFFIC which followed him to Vietnam.

In late August 1945, British occupying forces were ready to depart for various Southeast Asian destinations, and some were already on their way, when General Douglas MacArthur caused an uproar at the Southeast Asia Command by forbidding reoccupation until he had personally received the Japanese surrender in Tokyo, which was actually set for 28 August, but a typhoon caused the ceremony to be postponed until 2 September.

There was also chaos in Indochina—the Japanese had conducted a coup d'état against the French in March 1945 and successfully dismantled their control of Indochina. The Japanese then installed the new Empire of Vietnam under Bao Dai hoping to forestall a potential invasion by the Allies.

MacArthur's order had enormous consequences because the delay in the arrival of Allied troops enabled revolutionary groups to fill the power vacuums that had existed in Southeast Asia since the announcement of the Japanese capitulation on 15 August. In Indochina Japanese garrisons officially handed control to Bảo Đại in the North and the United Party in the South. This, however, allowed nationalist groups to take over public buildings in most of the major cities. The Communists, who exercised complete control over the Viet Minh coalition, founded by Ho Chi Minh in 1941, were thus presented with a power vacuum. The August Revolution commenced forcing Bảo Đại to abdicate in favor of Viet Minh. In Hanoi and Saigon, they rushed to seize the seats of government, by killing or intimidating their rivals. The Japanese did not oppose their takeover as they were reluctant to let the French retake control of their colony. Ho Chi Minh proclaimed Vietnam's independence on 2 September 1945.

The Allies, including the United States, stated that the French had sovereignty over Indochina, with America in favor of the return of Indochina to the French; but there was no official American animosity towards the Communist-led Viet Minh.

MacArthur received the Japanese surrender on board the battleship USS Missouri on 2 September, and three days later the first Allied medical rescue teams parachuted into the prisoner of war camps. During the following days a small advance party of support personnel and infantry escort from Gracey's force arrived in Saigon to check on conditions and report back; on the 11th a brigade was flown in from Hmawbi Field, Burma via Bangkok. When these advance Allied units landed in Saigon they found themselves in a bizarre position of being welcomed and guarded by fully armed Japanese and Viet Minh soldiers. The reason these soldiers were armed was because six months earlier (9 March) they disarmed and interned the French, for the Japanese feared an American landing in Indochina after the fall of Manila and did not trust the French.

Many political activists in the former French Cochinchina, of very different political beliefs, were highly educated and influenced by Western thought, and often interacted with each another. However, the Stalinist Viet Minh leadership in Hanoi resolved to assassinate or execute all Trotskyist and nationalist figures who opposed their centralized authority. Among those targeted were Bùi Quang Chiêu, Hồ Văn Ngà, Dương Văn Giáo, Tạ Thu Thâu, Trần Văn Thạch, Phan Văn Chánh, Phan Văn Hùm, Huỳnh Văn Phương, Lâm Ngọc Đường, Hồ Vĩnh Ký, Nguyễn Thị Sương, Lê Văn Vững, and Nguyễn Văn Sâm.

== British involvement ==
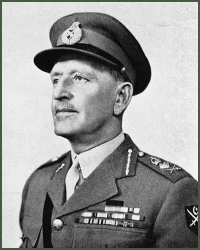
Major General Douglas Gracey commander of the 20th Indian Infantry Division

Upon Gracey's arrival on 13 September to receive the surrender of Japanese forces, he immediately realized the seriousness of the situation in the country. Saigon's administrative services had collapsed, and a loosely controlled Viet Minh-led group had seized power. In addition, since the Japanese were still fully armed, the Allies feared that they would be capable of undermining the Allied position. Furthermore, Gracey had poor communications with his higher headquarters in Burma because his American signal detachment was abruptly withdrawn by the U.S. government for political reasons; it was a loss that could not be rectified for several weeks.

Gracey wrote that unless something were done quickly, the state of anarchy would worsen. This situation was worsened by the Viet Minh's lack of strong control over some of their allied groups. Because of this, the French were able to persuade Gracey (in a move which exceeded the authority of his orders from Mountbatten) to rearm local colonial infantry regiments who were being held as prisoners of war.

Gracey allowed about 1,000 former French prisoners of war to be rearmed. They, with the arrival of the newly formed 5th Colonial Infantry Regiment (RIC) commandos, would then be capable of evicting the Viet Minh from what hold they had on the Saigon administration. Gracey saw this as the quickest way to allow the French to reassert their authority in Indochina while allowing him to proceed in disarming and repatriating the Japanese.

Gracey faced another problem in his relations with Mountbatten. One example of this occurred on Gracey's arrival in September. He drew up a proclamation that declared martial law and stated that he was responsible for law and order throughout Indochina south of the 16th parallel. Mountbatten, in turn, made an issue of this, claiming that Gracey was responsible for public security in key areas only. The proclamation was published on 21 September and, although Mountbatten disagreed with its wording, the Chiefs of Staff and the Foreign Office supported Gracey.

During the following days, Gracey gradually eased the Viet Minh grip on Saigon, replacing their guards in vital points with his own troops which were then turned over to French troops. This procedure was adopted because the Viet Minh would not have relinquished their positions directly to the French.

== Allies reassert control in Saigon ==
By 23 September, most of Saigon was back in French hands, with less than half a dozen vital positions in Viet Minh control. The French subsequently regained total control of Saigon. On that day, former French prisoners of war who had been reinstated into the army together with troops from the 5th RIC ejected the Viet Minh in a coup in which two French soldiers were killed.

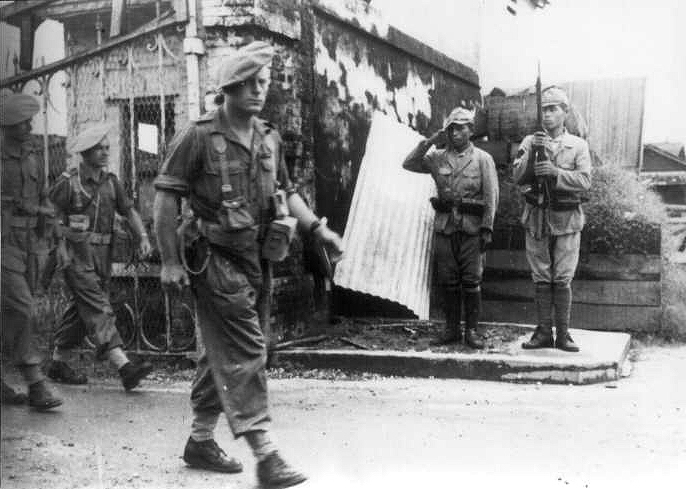
Free French Commandos in Saigon being saluted by Japanese Surrendered Personnel in November 1945

That same day, the local French population, jubilant at the restoration of the city, lost restraint, descending into rioting against the native population. This led to the events of 24-25 September, when a Vietnamese mob (alleged to be the Bình Xuyên, but later found to be Trotskyists), entered the Cité Hérault district of Saigon, lynching 150 French civilians while abducting a similar number - who later also perished. At the same time, the Viet Minh set up road blocks around Saigon, shooting Frenchmen who attempted to leave and accidentally killing OSS agent A. Peter Dewey, the first American to die in Vietnam. Elsewhere on the 25th, the Viet Minh attacked and set fire to the city's central market area, while another group attacked Tan Son Nhut Airfield. The airfield attack was repelled by the Gurkhas, where one British soldier was killed along with half a dozen Viet Minh. The British now had a war on their hands, something which Mountbatten had sought to avoid.

For the next few days, parties of armed Viet Minh clashed with British patrols, the Viet Minh suffering mounting losses with each encounter. The British soldiers were experienced troops who had just recently finished battling the Japanese; many officers and soldiers had also experienced internal security and guerrilla warfare in India and the North West Frontier. In contrast the Viet Minh were still learning how to fight a war.

In early October, Gracey held talks with the Viet Minh and a truce was agreed upon. On the 5th, General Philippe Leclerc, the senior French commander, arrived in Saigon where he and his troops were placed under Gracey's command. However, on 10 October, a state of semi-peace with the Viet Minh was broken by an unprovoked attack on a small British engineering party which was inspecting the water lines near Tan Son Nhut Airfield. Most of the engineering party were killed or wounded. Gracey accepted the fact that the level of insurrection was such that he would first have to pacify key areas before he could repatriate the Japanese. It was at this time that his small force had been strengthened by the arrival of his second infantry brigade, the 32nd, under Brigadier E.C.V. Woodford. Gracey deployed the 32nd Brigade into Saigon's northern suburbs of Gò Vấp and Gia Định. Once in this area the Viet Minh fell back before this force, which included armored car support from the Indian 16th Light Cavalry.

Aerial reconnaissance by Spitfires revealed that the roads approaching Saigon were blocked: the Viet Minh were attempting to strangle the city. On 13 October, Tan Son Nhut Airfield came under attack again by the Viet Minh; their commandos and sappers were able this time to come within 275m of the control tower. They were also at the doors of the radio station before the attack was blunted by Indian and Japanese soldiers. As the Viet Minh fell back from the airfield, the Japanese were ordered to pursue them until nightfall, when contact was broken.

By mid-October, 307 Viet Minh had been killed by British/Indian troops and 225 were killed by Japanese troops, including the new body count of 80 more Viet Minh at Da Lat. On one occasion, the Japanese repulsed an attack on their headquarters at Phú Lâm, killing 100 Viet Minh. British, French, and Japanese casualties were small by comparison. On the 17th, the third brigade, the 100th, commanded by Brigadier C.H.B. Rodham, arrived in Indochina.

=== Viet Minh attacks ===
The Viet Minh next assaulted Saigon's vital points, the power plant, docks, airfield, and for the third time, even the city's artesian wells. Periodically, Saigon was blacked out at night and the sound of small arms, grenades, mines, mortars, and artillery became familiar throughout the city. Unable to overwhelm Saigon's defenses, the Viet Minh intensified their siege tactics. During this time, newly arrived French troops were given the task of helping to break the siege while aggressive British patrolling kept the Viet Minh off-balance.

On 25 October, the only known evidence of direct Soviet involvement in the area came about, when a Japanese patrol captured a Russian adviser near Thủ Dầu Một. He was handed over to Lieutenant Colonel Cyril Jarvis, commander of the 1/1 Gurkha Rifles. Jarvis tried several attempts at interrogation, but it was fruitless, so the intruder was handed over to the Sûreté, the French criminal investigation department (equivalent to the CID). From there, he disappeared from the annals of history.

On 29 October, the British formed a strong task force with the objective of pushing the Viet Minh further away from Saigon. This force was called "Gateforce" after its commander, Lieutenant Colonel Gates of 14/13th Frontier Force Rifles. Gateforce consisted of Indian infantry, artillery, and armored cars, and a Japanese infantry battalion. During their operations they killed around 190 Viet Minh; during one operation around Xuân Lộc, east of Saigon, the Japanese killed 50 Viet Minh when they surprised a Viet Minh group in training.

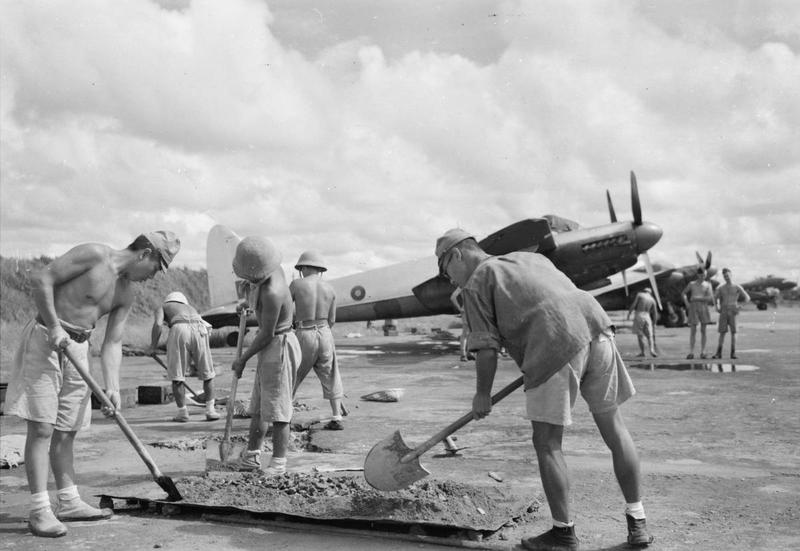
Japanese POWs under British supervision repairing the taxiing strip at Saigon airfield. Behind them is an RAF de Havilland Mosquito aircraft, December 1945

On 18 November, a Gurkha unit set out for Long Kiến, south of Saigon, to rescue French hostages held there. While en route, the force was forced to turn back as it was not strong enough to overcome the Viet Minh they encountered. A few days later a stronger force was dispatched. According to the Gurkhas, they had seen Japanese deserters leading some Viet Minh war parties. During this operation the only kukri (Nepalese knife) charge of the campaign occurred. According to a Gurkha platoon leader, they were held up by determined Viet Minh defenders occupying an old French fort. The Gurkhas blew in the doors with a bazooka, then drew their kukris and charged into the fort, putting the defenders to the knife. Long Kien was reached the same day. No hostages were recovered, but about 80 Viet Minh were killed during the operation.

By early December, Gracey was able to turn over Saigon's northern suburbs to the French, when 32 Brigade relinquished responsibility to General Valluy's 9th Colonial Infantry Division. On Christmas Day, the 32nd set out for Borneo. Many of the newly arrived French soldiers were ex-Maquis (French Resistance), not accustomed to military discipline.

During the battles of the South Central Highlands, the Viet Minh forced French troops to leave many villages and newly captured positions in the Central Highlands. The Vietnamese recaptured the town of Buôn Ma Thuột in mid-December. Spitfires of No. 273 Squadron RAF attacked the Viet Minh on 11 December.

On 3 January 1946, the last big battle occurred between the British and the Viet Minh. About 900 Viet Minh attacked the 14/13 Frontier Force Rifles camp at Biên Hòa. The fighting lasted throughout the night, and when it was over about 100 attackers had been killed without the loss of a single British or Indian soldier. Most Viet Minh casualties were caused by British machine-gun crossfire.

=== End of the campaign ===
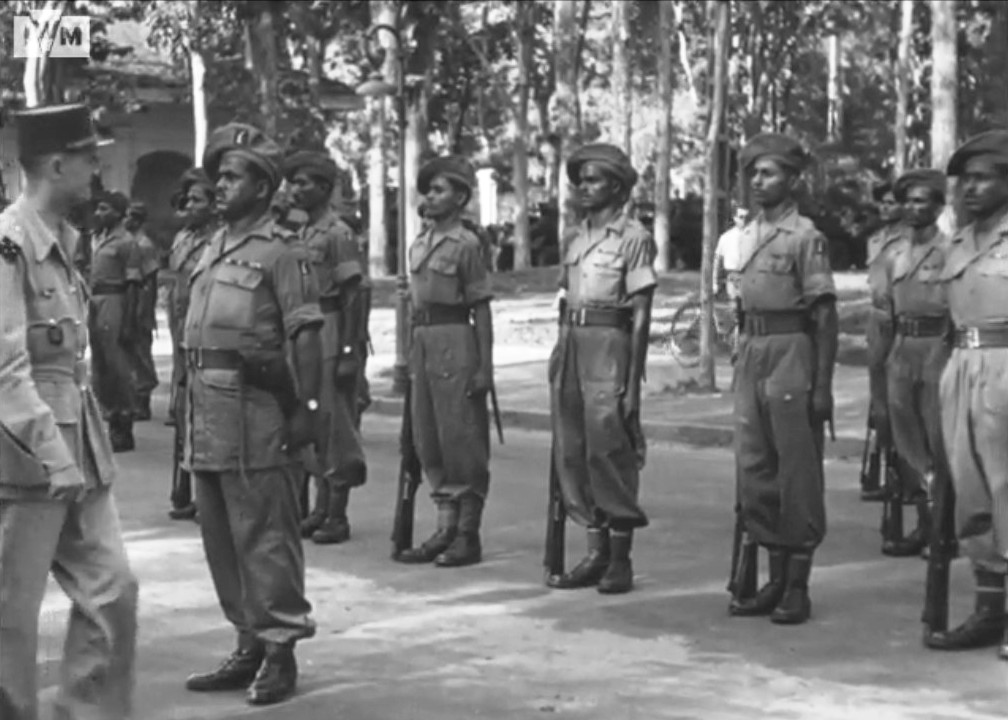
General Leclerc reviews troops of the 20th Indian Division in Saigon, 22 December 1945.

In mid-January, the Viet Minh began to avoid large-scale attacks on the British/Indian, French, and Japanese forces. They began to take on fighting characteristics which later became common: ambushes, hit-and-run raids, and assassinations, while the British, French, and Japanese constantly patrolled and conducted security sweeps. This was the first modern unconventional war, and although the Viet Minh had sufficient manpower to sustain a long campaign, they were beaten back by well-led professional troops who were familiar with an Asian jungle and countryside.

By the end of the month, 80 Brigade handed over its theater of operations to the French, and the 100 Brigade was withdrawn into Saigon. Gracey flew out on the 28th. Before his departure, he signed control over French forces to Leclerc. The last British forces left on 26 March, so ending the seven-month intervention in Vietnam; and on 30 March, the SS Islami took aboard the last two British/Indian battalions in Vietnam. Only a single company of the 2/8 Punjab remained to guard the Allied Control Mission in Saigon, and on 15 May it left, the mission having been disbanded a day earlier as the French became responsible for getting the remaining Japanese home. The last British troops to die in Vietnam were six soldiers killed in an ambush in June 1946.

== Aftermath ==
=== Casualties ===
For Britain's involvement in the First Vietnam War, the officially stated casualty list was 40 British and Indian soldiers killed, and French and Japanese casualties were a little higher. An estimated 2,700 Viet Minh were dead. The unofficial total may be higher, but given the methods with which the Viet Minh recovered their dead and wounded, the exact number may never be known. About 600 of the dead Viet Minh were killed in action while fighting against British forces, the rest by the French and Japanese.

Vietnamese civilians were robbed, raped and killed by French soldiers in Saigon when they came back in September 1945. Vietnamese women were also raped in north Vietnam by the French like in Bảo Hà, Bảo Yên District, Lào Cai province and Phu Lu, which caused 400 Vietnamese who the French trained to defect on 20 June 1948. Buddhist statues were looted and Vietnamese were robbed, raped and tortured by the French after the French crushed the Viet Minh in northern Vietnam in 1946-1948 forcing the Viet Minh to flee into Yunnan, China for sanctuary and aid from the Chinese Communists. A French reporter was told, "We know what war always is, we understand your soldiers taking our animals, our jewellery, our Buddhas; it is normal. We are resigned to their raping our wives and our daughters; war has always been like that. But we object to being treated in the same way, not only our sons, but ourselves, old men and dignitaries that we are," by Vietnamese village notables. Vietnamese rape victims became "half insane".

=== Significance ===
Trotskyists were hunted down and eliminated by both the Stalinist-front Viet Minh and French Sûreté. The rift between the Viet Minh and non-communist nationalists also became deepened.

Three more bloody decades of fighting lay ahead which would end in defeat for a world superpower and an ailing colonial, discredited power. Therefore, some historians have observed that if the British had not withdrawn from Vietnam, the Viet Minh would have been defeated, and communism would have not gained support in Vietnam. From March to July 1946, the Viet Minh systematically set about, as Ho's lieutenant Lê Duẩn said, "(to) wipe out the reactionaries." Known as the "Great Purge", the goal was to eliminate everyone thought dangerous to the Communist Party of Vietnam and tens of thousands of nationalists, Catholics and others were massacred from 1946 to 1948.

Between May and December, Ho Chi Minh spent four months in France attempting to negotiate full independence and unity for Vietnam, but failed to obtain any guarantee from the French. After a series of violent clashes with Viet Minh, French forces bombarded Haiphong harbor, captured Haiphong and attempted to expel the Viet Minh from Hanoi, a task that took two months.

19 December 1946 is often cited as the date for the beginning of the First Indochina War, as on that day 30,000 Viet Minh under Giap initiated their first large-scale attack on the French in the Battle of Hanoi. The War in Vietnam of 1946–1954, had begun.

== See also ==
- Chinese occupation of northern Vietnam, 1945–1946
- Civil conflicts in Vietnam (1945–1949)
- Operation Beleaguer
- Operation Blacklist Forty
- Occupation of Japan
- Malayan Emergency

== Bibliography ==
- McHale, Shawn F. (2021). The First Vietnam War: Violence, Sovereignty, and the Fracture of the South, 1945–1956. Cambridge University Press. ISBN 9781108936002.
