= Lê Văn Viễn =

Vietnamese gang leader and military officer (1904–1972)

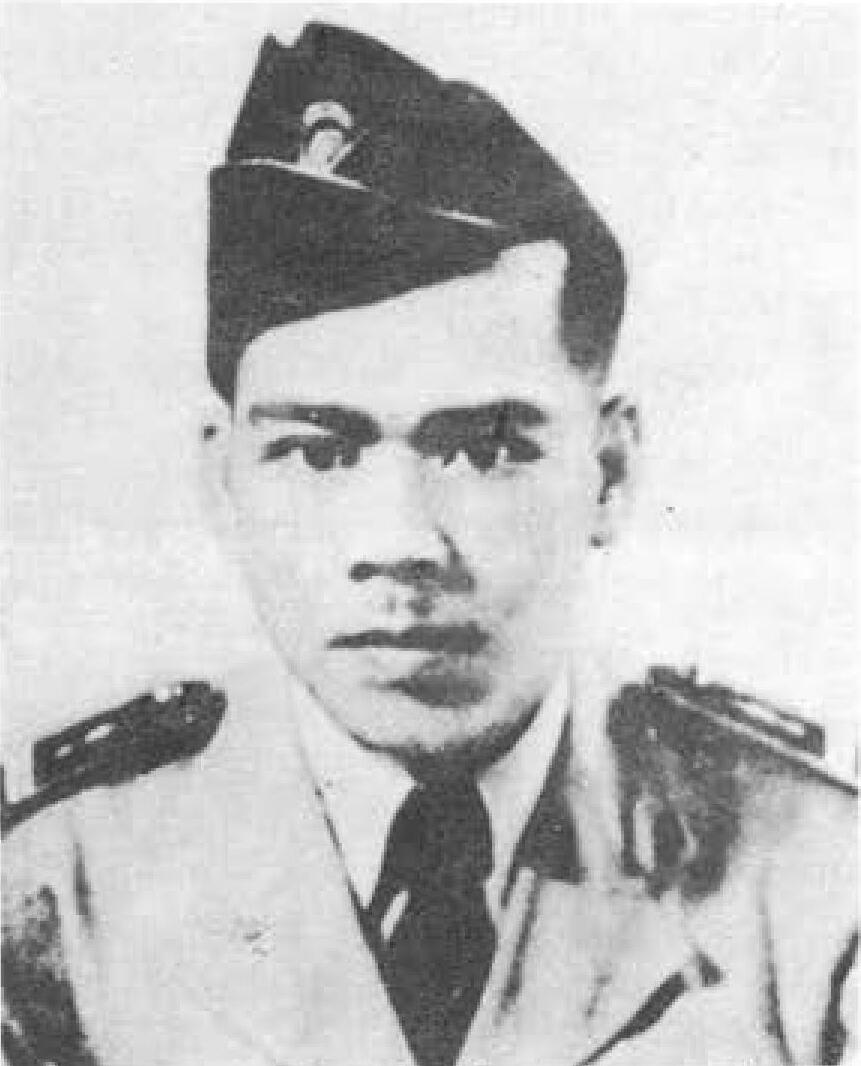

Governor of Saigon-Cholon
- In office 22 April 1952 – 21 May 1954
- Prime Minister: Trần Văn Hữu; Nguyễn Văn Tâm; Bửu Lộc; Ngô Đình Diệm
- Chief of State: Bảo Đại
- Preceded by: Himself (as Mayor of Sai Gon-Cholon)

Mayor of Saigon-Cholon
- In office 6/1948 – 22 April 1952
- Chief of State: Bảo Đại
- Succeeded by: Himself (as governor)

Chief of Bình Xuyên
- In office 1946–1954
- Preceded by: Dương Văn Dương

Supreme commander of Resistance Forces in Saigon-Cholon
- In office November 1945 – December 1946
- General commander of Southern Resistance Forces: Nguyễn Bình

Deputy commander of Warzone 7
- In office December 1946 – June 1948

Personal details
- Born: 1904 Saigon, Cochinchina, French Indochina
- Died: 1972 (aged 67–68) Paris, France
- Awards: National Order of Vietnam

Military service
- Allegiance: Việt Minh (until 1948) (South Vietnam) State of Vietnam
- Branch/service: Infantry, Việt Minh, Vietnamese National Army
- Years of service: 1945–55
- Rank: Major-général (Thiếu Tướng)
- Battles/wars: First Indochina War

Major General Lê Văn Viễn (Vietnamese: [lē vāŋ vǐəŋˀ]; 1904–1972), also known as Bảy Viễn ("Viễn the Seventh"), was the leader of the Bình Xuyên, a powerful Vietnamese criminal enterprise decreed by the Head of State, Bảo Đại, as an independent army within the Vietnamese National Army (Quân đội Quốc gia Việt Nam). Viễn's career trajectory was quite unique in coming from a criminal background to become a (non-Communist) leader of the Việt Minh's Zone 7, then later named a General, in charge of an auxiliary military force within the French Union, and, finally, named a General in the VNA. From 1951–55, he made arrangements with Bảo Đại, by which the Bình Xuyên was given control of their own affairs in return for their financial support of the government. In 1955, Viễn flew to Paris with the help of Antoine-Marie Savani and the Deuxième Bureau/SDECE after his unsuccessful attempt to oust the American-backed Premier, Ngô Đình Diệm.

== Biography ==
=== Early life ===
Lê Văn Viễn was born in Cholon in 1904 to a Chinese (Chaozhou) father and a Vietnamese mother. His father, Lê Văn Dậu, joined the Vietnamese branch of the Tiandihui when he migrated to Vietnam. Viễn was head of the Bình Xuyên and was hunted by the French in the 1930s and 1940s until he and a number of his cohorts were eventually captured and sentenced to confinement in the penal colony on Côn Sơn Island. Ba Dương, meanwhile, had become a labor broker for the Japanese and entered into a relationship with the Japanese secret service's southern Vietnamese agent, Matsushita Mitsuhiro, a pivotal clandestine operator who was undercover as the director of Dainan Koosi, and was controlled by the Japanese Consul General in Hanoi, Yoshio Minoda.

Matsushita arranged for the kempeitai to free disparate Bình Xuyên personalities and component gangs from Côn Sơn in 1941. Thereafter, under Japanese patronage, the Bình Xuyên grew rapidly, both in organization and influence. Bảy Viễn escaped Côn Sơn in early 1945 and returned to Saigon, where he engaged in insurgent politics in collusion with Ba Dương and the Japanese. On 9 March 1945, the Japanese staged a coup d'état against the Vichy French administration, jailing all French police. The Bình Xuyên were given amnesty and Bảy Viễn was installed as a police official by the newly established government.

=== From brigand to revolutionary ===
In August 1945, the Việt Minh chief of Cochinchina, Trần Văn Giàu, formed an alliance with Bảy Viễn and Ba Dương against the French. When the Việt Minh called a mass demonstration on 25 August 1945: "... fifteen well armed, bare chested bandits carrying a large banner declaring 'Bình Xuyên Assassination Committee' joined the tens of thousands of demonstrators who marched jubilantly through downtown Saigon for over nine hours."

Following the British-supported French counter-coup in September 1945, the Việt Minh withdrew from Saigon, leaving Bảy Viễn as military commander of Cholon with a force of 100 men. Viễn promptly formed an alliance with Lai Van Sang's two-thousand-man student group, the Avant-Garde Youth. Together with a number of Japanese deserters, they engaged the French. By the end of October, they were pushed back to the Rung Sat in a waterborne retrograde action which displayed as a key element the deployment of some 250 stay-behind agents. The Bình Xuyên stay-behind agents promptly engaged in a ruthless campaign of terror and extortion. A constant influx of men, money and materiel quickly established the Bình Xuyên as a well-armed, disciplined force of approximately 10,000 men. A dispute arose between Ba Dương and the Việt Minh in January 1946. In February 1946, Ba Dương was killed in a strafing raid by French aircraft.

=== Revolutionary turned collaborator ===
Sensing a shift in the political tide, Bảy Viễn seized the opportunity to consolidate his hold on the Bình Xuyên and achieve dominance. In the wake of Ba Dương's death, Viễn began secret negotiations with the French Deuxième Bureau for exclusive rights to territory in Saigon, ultimately leading to a March 1948 agreement with Savani, which was formalized on 16 June 1948. The French government announced that it "… had decided to confide the police and maintenance of order to the Bình Xuyên troops in a zone where they are used to operating."

Thereafter, the French turned over Saigon, block-by-block, and by April 1954, Lai Van Sang was director-general of police and the Bình Xuyên controlled not only the Saigon-Cholon capital region but a sixty-mile strip between Saigon and Vũng Tàu, exercising full political and economic control. United States observers of the process laconically refer to the Binh Xuyên in this era as a: "... political and racketeering organization which had agreed to carry out police functions [for the Government of Viet-Nam] in return for a monopoly on gambling, opium traffic and prostitution in the metropolitan areas."

=== General Viễn and the defeat of the Bình Xuyên ===
The United States backed Premier Ngô Đình Diệm in his fight to control South Vietnam. In the Battle of Saigon from 28 April to 3 May 1955, Bảy Viễn and his loyal troops were forced back to the Rừng Sác jungle where they were defeated by the regular army. Vien stated that he was critical of the United States for having imposed on Vietnam the dictature of Ngô Đình Diệm.

Viễn fled to exile in France with the assistance of French authorities, and the Bình Xuyên organization fragmented, later resuming its clandestine form. Viễn stayed in France where he died, in Paris, on 27 September 1972, aged 67 or 68.

== Bibliography ==
- "AFRVN Military History Section, J-5, Strategic Planning and Policy". Quân Sử 4: Quân lực Việt Nam Cộng Hòa trong giai-đoạn hình-thành: 1946-1955 (reprinted from the 1972 edition in Taiwan, DaiNam Publishing, 1977). 1966. pp. 408–428.
- Hồ Sơn Đài (2008). Bộ đội Bình Xuyên [Binh Xuyen Force] (in Vietnamese). HCM City.
- Lucien Bodard (1977). La guerre d'Indochine [The Indochina War] (in French). Hachette. ISBN 978-2-246-55291-8.
- Darcourt, Pierre (1977). Bay Vien, le maître de Cholon [Bay Vien, Cholon's Master] (in French). Hachette. ISBN 978-2-01-003449-7.
- Alfred W. McCoy (2003-05-01). The Politics of Heroin. Lawrence Hill Books. ISBN 978-1-55652-483-7.
- Nguyên Hùng (2005). Bảy Viễn Thủ Lĩnh Bình Xuyên [Bay Vien, Binh Xuyen's Leader] (in Vietnamese). Công an nhân dân Việt Nam - Vietnamese People's Public Security.
