= Nguyễn Bình =

Vietnamese general (1906–1951)

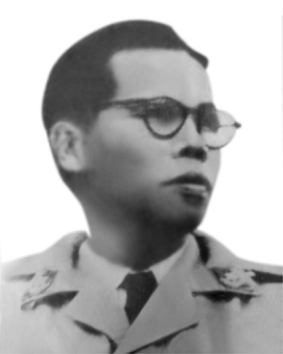

Vice Chairman of the Southern Resistance Committee
- In office 1945–1951
- Chairman: Trần Văn Giàu

General commander of Southern Resistance Armed Forces
- In office 20 January 1948 – 29 September 1951

Commander of the Southern Command
- In office 1948–1951

Military Commissioner of the Southern Military Department
- In office Jun 1948 – October 1948

Commander of the Dong Trieu military zone
- In office Jun 1945 – August 1945

Personal details
- Born: Nguyễn Phương Thảo; 30 July 1908 Hải Hưng, French Indochina
- Died: September 29, 1951 (aged 43) Stung Treng, Cambodia
- Nickname(s): Ba Thảo, Ba Bình, One-eyed general

Military service
- Allegiance: Viet Minh
- Years of service: 1926–1951
- Rank: Lieutenant General
- Commands: General Commander of armed forces in South Vietnam
- Battles/wars: World War II; First Indochina War

Nguyễn Bình, born Nguyễn Phương Thảo (30 July 1908 - 29 September 1951), was a Lieutenant-general in the Viet Minh. He was imprisoned by the French on the island of Poulo Condor in the early 1920s. He was sent by Ho Chi Minh in 1945 to establish a resistance to French rule in Cochinchina where he established his base of operations in the Plain of Reeds near Saigon. A former member of the Việt Nam Quốc Dân Đảng, he joined the Indochinese Communist Party in 1946.

== History ==
According to Vietnamese historian Christopher Goscha, Nguyễn Bình was born in Hải Hưng Province in northern Vietnam, Nguyễn Bình came from a poor family. After finishing his primary schooling, he moved to Haiphong and then made his way to Cochinchina where he worked as a laundry boy and frequented the docks of Saigon, as well as worked on board the French liner 'd'Artagnan' of the Messageries Maritimes.

He also became increasingly involved in nationalist politics. It was during this time that he befriended an influential intellectual and journalist, Trần Huy Liệu, who introduced him into the Vietnamese Nationalist Party (Việt Nam Quốc Dân Đảng, VNQDD) in 1928. A year later, he was captured in Marseille due his political activities and was sentenced to hard labor in Poulo Condor. There, he united with Liệu and other members of the Nationalist Party. However, both Bình and Liệu were menaced to death by the extreme right group in the party due to their left-leaning ideology and eventually got attacked, resulting Bình blinded in one eye. Aftermath, while Liệu crossed over to the Indochinese Communist Party (ICP) while doing hard time, Nguyễn Bình did not. He left the island on 12 October 1934, and the nature of his activities during the rest of the 1930s remains a mystery.

During World War II, he reappeared in Haiphong, organizing anti-Japanese and then anti-French activities in cooperation with communists working in the Red River Delta, including his long time friend Trần Huy Liệu. During this time, he officially broke away from the Vietnam Nationalist Party and changed his name to Nguyễn Bình, with "Bình" (meaning "peace" in Vietnamese) expressing his will to establish world peace (Bình thiên hạ), Following the Japanese overthrow of the French, Nguyễn Bình began organizing his own local armed forces in the coastal areas of northeastern Vietnam, in what was known as the Tran Hung Dao war zone. With the emergence of the Democratic Republic of Vietnam (DRV) in September 1945, Ho Chi Minh and other communist leaders were impressed by Nguyễn Bình's initiative in these areas. They brought him into the government and turned this independent-minded nationalist into their military commander-in-chief for a southern Vietnam already at war.

Nguyễn Bình arrived in the south in November 1945 and began unifying bandit groups, sects, and religious forces as best he could into an organized armed force to fight the French forces of General Philippe Leclerc. In December 1945, Nguyễn Bình became chief of war Zone VII (Bo Tu Lenh Khu VII) in eastern Nam Bo, including the colonial city of Saigon-Cholon, replacing Trần Vǎn Giàu. When all the best French forces were transferred to the north in March 1946, he was able to strengthen his guerrilla activities considerably in the south. In June 1946, Nguyễn Bình joined the Indochinese Communist Party. Later that year, he urged Hanoi-based leaders to forget about negotiating with the French and to prepare instead for full-scale war, including the leveling of Hanoi. Indeed, he ran an angry urban war against the French and their Vietnamese allies in the streets and back alleys of Saigon-Cholon throughout the rest of the 1940s. On several occasions, Nguyễn Bình made his way secretly into Saigon to organize sabotage and assassination squads.

In early 1947, as the French began to break off the Cao Dai and Hoa Hao from Nguyễn Bình's united front, he took a hard line towards the defecting religious leaders. The result was civil war between Nguyễn Bình's army and the forces of the Hoa Hao and Cao Dai, leading to the Viet Minh's assassination of Huỳnh Phú Sổ. In 1948, the leader of the Binh Xuyen, Lê Văn Viễn, broke with Nguyễn Bình and defected to the French side. In January 1948, Nguyễn Bình was named lieutenant general in the Viet Minh, second only to General Võ Nguyên Giáp.

In 1949, as the Vietnamese prepared for the “general counter-offensive”, Ho Chi Minh named him commander of the armed forces in the south. Nguyễn Bình began building in earnest a modern army, organized in battalions and briefly as regiments. In 1949 and 1950, apparently on orders from the north, he launched head-on attacks against French posts across southern Vietnam. Thanks to superior artillery and air power, the French handed him one of his worst setbacks in his life while powerful communists began to criticize his tactics. Nonetheless, Nguyễn Bình had demonstrated that not only could southerners fight an urban war, but they could also move towards creating a modern army as in the north, and this without a Chinese rear-guard and large-scale foreign aid.

== Personality ==
Bình was described by one French journalist as "cruel, indefatigable, pitiless, authoritarian." He became a hero to some in the revolutionary movement, and an enemy to many in the Hòa Hảo, Cao Đài, and other organizations that eventually opposed the DRV.

== Death ==
In late 1951, following important changes occurring at the international level and within the ICP, the DRV summoned Nguyễn Bình to the north for further training and consultations in preparation for the wider war against the French, including the creation of a trans-Indochinese supply trail running from the north to the south. While crossing through northeastern Cambodia, Nguyễn Bình perished in an ambush in September 1951 laid by the 4th Bataillon de Chasseurs Cambodgiens under Jacques Hogard. Nguyễn Bình's remains were returned to Vietnam from Cambodia in 2000.
