= Nguyen Van Thinh =

Vietnamese doctor and politician (1888–1946)

Nguyễn Văn Thinh
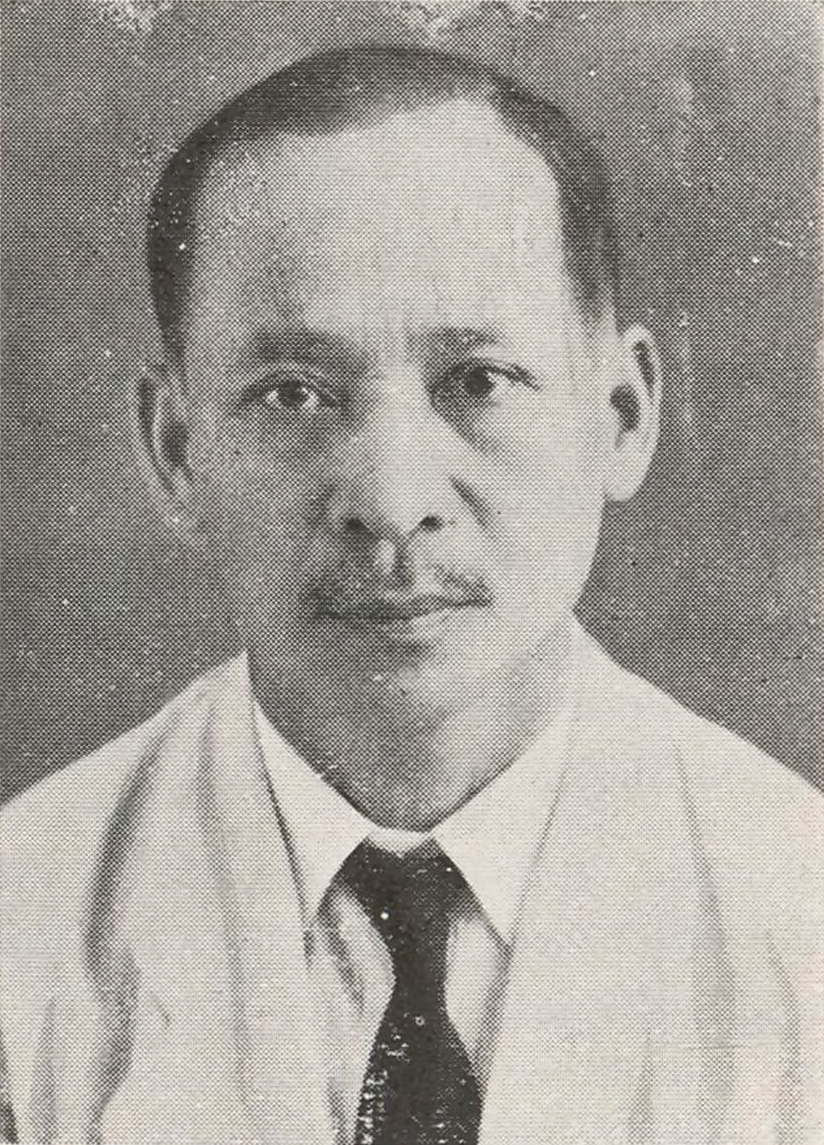

1st President of the Autonomous Republic of Cochinchina
- In office 1 June 1946 – 10 November 1946
- Vice President: Nguyễn Văn Xuân
- Preceded by: Position established
- Succeeded by: Lê Văn Hoạch

Personal details
- Born: 1888 Cochinchina, French Indochina
- Died: 10 November 1946 (aged 57–58) Saigon, Cochinchina, French Indochina
- Party: Indochinese Democratic Party

Nguyễn Văn Thinh (Vietnamese pronunciation: [ŋwiən˦ˀ˥ van˧˧ tʰïŋ˧˧]; 1888 – 10 November 1946, Saigon) was the first President of Cochinchina. Thinh was a French citizen and joined the Constitutionalist Party in 1926. He founded the Cochinchinese Democratic Party in 1937. He became chief of the provisional government on March 26, 1946, and provisional president on June 1. He felt a loss of face when the French negotiated with the Viet Minh, ignoring his government. "I am being compelled to play a farce," he said. He died, in an apparent suicide while still in office, on November 10.

== Family and education ==
Dr. Nguyễn Văn Thinh was born in 1888, in an aristocratic family in the South of Vietnam.

He was the first valedictorian of the Indochina School of Medicine in 1907, and one of the first Vietnamese medical students who successfully passed the examination for Interne Doctors at the Hospital of Paris (Interne des Hôpitaux de Paris).

He worked at Pasteur Institute (Paris), where he finished his thesis.

== Political life ==
Dr. Nguyễn Văn Thinh started his political career as a Constitutionalist by holding Phan Chu Trinh's funeral ceremony. Later, he founded the Democratic Party of Indochina in 1937. He was one of the founders of the Vietnamese Language Propagating Association and the chairman of the Association for Hunger.

== Honors ==
Before 1975, there is a street named after him, Nguyễn Văn Thinh Street in Saigon, now is Mạc Thị Bưởi Street lies between Hai Bà Trưng and Đồng Khởi Street in Saigon, Ho Chi Minh City.

- Legion of Honour

Political offices
Preceded by Position established	President of the Autonomous Republic of Cochinchina; 1946	Succeeded by Lê Văn Hoạch
