= Battle of Saigon (1955) =

Military revolt in Vietnam

- Part of Civil conflicts in Vietnam (1945–1949)
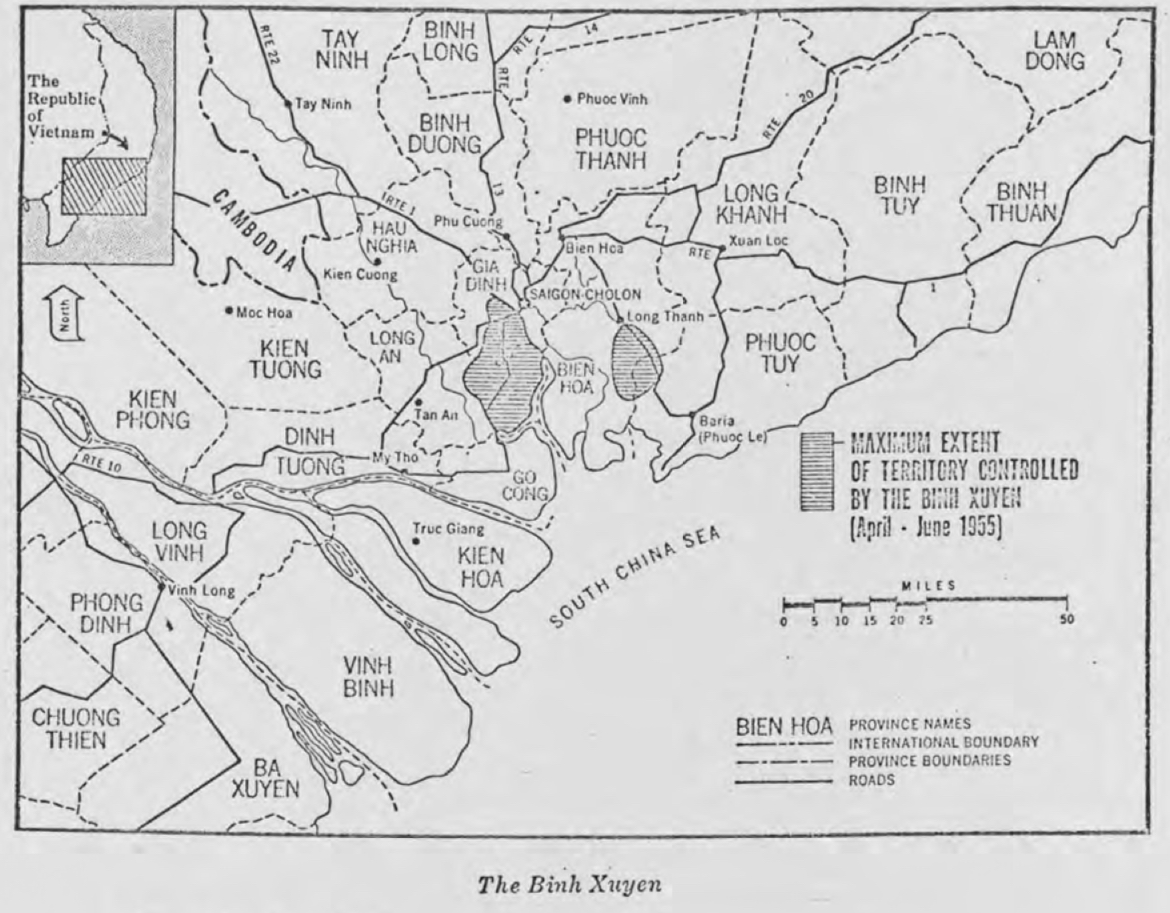
- Territory controlled by the Bình Xuyên in 1955
Date	28 April – 4 May 1955 (1 week)
Location	Saigon, South Vietnam
Result	Diệm's government victory

Belligerents
Diệm's government: Vietnamese National Army	Bình Xuyên Supported by : Chief of State

Commanders and leaders
(South Vietnam) Ngô Đình Diệm (South Vietnam) Dương Văn Minh (South Vietnam) Nguyễn Khánh (South Vietnam) Đỗ Cao Trí	Lê Văn Viễn; Bảo Đại

Casualties and losses
- 500–1,000 deaths

The Battle of Saigon was a week-long battle in South Vietnam (State of Vietnam) between the army of Diệm's government and the private army of the Bình Xuyên organised crime syndicate. At the time, the Bình Xuyên was licensed with controlling the national police by the Chief of State Bảo Đại, and Prime Minister Ngô Đình Diệm issued an ultimatum for them to surrender and come under state control. The battle started in Saigon capital on April 28, 1955, and Diệm's government had largely crushed the Bình Xuyên within a week. Fighting was mostly concentrated in the inner city Chinese business district of Chợ Lớn. The densely crowded area saw some 500 to 1000 deaths and up to 20,000 civilians made homeless in the cross-fire. In the end, the Bình Xuyên were decisively defeated, their army disbanded and their vice operations collapsed.

== Prelude ==
On the midnight of March 29–30, explosions rocked Saigon as the Bình Xuyên responded to Diệm's removal of its police chief. 200 Bình Xuyên troops launched an attack on VNA headquarters. The clashes were inconclusive, with the VNA suffering six deaths to their opponents’ 10, but by sunrise, the bodies of civilians littered the sidewalk.

== Battle ==
The final battle between Diệm's VNA and the Bình Xuyên began on April 28 at mid-day. After initial small-arms fire and mortar exchanges, the VNA resorted to the heaviest artillery in its arsenal. This coincided with growing calls from within the Eisenhower administration to oust Diệm because Eisenhower believed that he was unable to subdue the Bình Xuyên and unify the country. By evening, a large part of the inner city was engulfed in house-to-house combat. By the morning of April 29, the fighting had driven thousands of civilians onto the streets. A square mile of the city, around the densely populated inner-city Chinese district of Chợ Lớn where the Bình Xuyên had a stronghold, became a free-fire zone. Artillery and mortars leveled the poor districts of the city, killing five hundred civilians and leaving twenty thousand homeless. Observers described that fighting from both sides as lacking strategy and relying on brute-force attrition tactics. One of the few maneuvers that was considered tactical was an attempt by the VNA to cut off Bình Xuyên reinforcements by demolishing the bridge across the Saigon–Chợ Lớn canal. This was made moot when the Bình Xuyên threw pontoon bridges across the canal. It appeared that the conflict would be determined by the side which was able to absorb the greater number of losses. Approximately 300 combatants were killed in the first day of fighting.

On the morning of April 28 in Washington, John Foster Dulles, the US Secretary of State, phoned J. Lawton Collins to suspend moves aimed at replacing Diệm. Eisenhower had determined that these were to be put on hold pending the outcome of the VNA operation. Collins and Dulles clashed in the National Security Council meeting, with Collins vehemently calling for Diệm to be removed. Collins continued to argue that the attempt to destroy the Bình Xuyên by force would produce a civil war. The NSC endorsed Dulles’ position.

After 48 hours of combat, the VNA began to gain the upper hand. Le Grand Monde, previously Bảy Viễn’s largest gambling establishment, and temporarily serving as a Bình Xuyên citadel, was overrun by Diệm’s paratroopers after a struggle which caused heavy losses on both sides. The VNA then stormed one of the Bình Xuyên’s most heavily fortified strongholds, the Petrus Ký High School in Chợ Lớn. By the time Collins had arrived back in South Vietnam on May 2, the battle was almost won. The Bình Xuyên forces were broken and in retreat and their command posts were levelled. Bảy Viễn’s headquarters was battered and his tigers, pythons and crocodiles inside had been killed by mortar attacks and shelling.

== Aftermath ==
Bảy Viễn escaped to Paris to live out his life on the profits of his criminal ventures, and the VNA pursued the Bình Xuyên remnants into the Mekong Delta near the Cambodian border. In Saigon, jubilant crowds gathered outside Diệm’s residence shouting “Đả đảo Bảo Đại” (meaning “Down with Bảo Đại”).
