= Nguyễn Khoa Toàn =

Vietnamese painter

- Born: 1898
- Died: 1965 (aged 66–67)
- Occupation: Painter

Nguyễn Khoa Toàn (1898-1965) was a Vietnamese painter. He studied in France and was regarded as a traditionalist. He was noted for his portraits of women of Huế, such as "Thanh minh", “Đường lên lăng”, “Mẹ con”.
