= Lê Văn Hoạch =

Vietnamese doctor and politician (1896–1978)

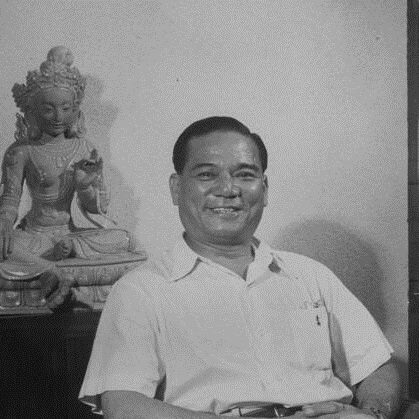
- Hoạch in 1948

Deputy Prime Minister of the State of Vietnam
- In office 8 January 1953 – 17 December 1953 Serving with Nguyễn Huy Lai
- Prime Minister: Nguyễn Văn Tâm
- Preceded by: Phan Văn Giáo; Ngô Thúc Địch
- Succeeded by: Nguyễn Trung Vinh

2nd President of the Autonomous Republic of Cochinchina
- In office 7 December 1946 – 8 October 1947
- Deputy: Nguyễn Văn Xuân
- Preceded by: Nguyễn Văn Thinh
- Succeeded by: Nguyễn Văn Xuân

Personal details
- Born: 1896 Cần Thơ, Cochinchina, French Indochina
- Died: 1978 (aged 81–82) Hậu Giang province, Vietnam
- Party: Independent (from 1947); Vietnam National Rally (until 1947)
- Education: University of Indochina (Medical degree)
- Profession: Doctor; Politician

Lê Văn Hoạch (Vietnamese pronunciation: [le˧˧ van˧˧ hwajk̟̚˧˨ʔ]; 1896 – 1978) was a Vietnamese doctor and politician who served as president of Cochinchina from 1946 to 1947.

== Biography ==
He was born in 1896 in Phong Điền district, Cần Thơ, Cochinchina, French Indochina. He earned a medical degree from the University of Indochina. Afterward, he went overseas to France to further his studies. After returning from his studies overseas, he became active in the Cao Đài movement in Saigon. He was also the police chief in Cần Thơ during the Japanese coup d'état in French Indochina in March 1945. He was able to take control of Cần Thơ from the Imperial Japanese and he protected the French. As a reward, the French decided to make him a delegate for Cần Thơ province at the Consultative Council.

After the suicide of Nguyen Van Thinh, the French supported Hoạch to become the next prime minister and leader of the Autonomous Republic of Cochinchina. He assumed the office on 7 December 1946 and would serve until 8 October 1947. He was succeeded by his deputy Nguyễn Văn Xuân. Despite having the French support, Hoạch was a strong supporter for the independence of Cochinchina. On 11 December 1947 he would form the Vietnam National Assembly in Saigon. In addition to getting support from people in Cochinchina, he was able to get some support in Annam and Tonkin which resulted in the formation Vietnam National Rally on 23 December 1947. He would later go on and proclaim that he supported the monarchy form of government and he claims that there were extensive support from the Cao Đài, Hòa Hảo, and the Catholics.

=== Personal life ===
He was an adherent of Caodaism. He had a younger brother named Lê Văn Huấn who was a teacher and taught at Petrus Ký High School. His brother was a follower of the Viet Minh and affiliated with the Vietnamese Fatherland Front and a vice chairman of the National Liberation Front of South Vietnam commonly known as the Viet Cong.

Political offices
Preceded by Nguyễn Văn Thinh	Prime Minister of the Autonomous Republic of Cochinchina; 1946–1947	Succeeded by Nguyễn Văn Xuân
