= Dương Văn Dương =

Vietnamese military leader

Major General Dương Văn Dương
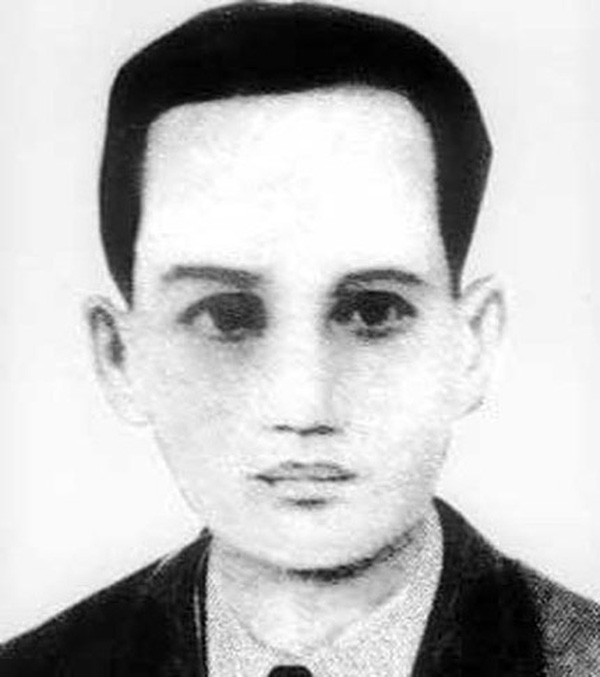

Personal details
- Born: 1900 Gia Định, Cochinchina
- Died: 1946 (aged 45–46) Bến Tre, Cochinchina
- Nickname: Ba Dương

Military service
- Allegiance: Democratic Republic of Vietnam
- Branch/service: People's Army of Vietnam
- Rank: Major General (posthumously)

Dương Văn Dương (1900 – February 20, 1946) was a Vietnamese military officer and leader of the Bình Xuyên army. His nickname was Ba Dương (Dương the Third). He was born in 1900 to a family of poor peasants in Bến Tre Province. During the 1920s, Ba Dương became the leader of the Bình Xuyên, then a coalition of river pirates who extorted protection money from the sampans that traveled the canals on their way to the Cholon docks. Known for stealing from the rich and giving to the poor, the Bình Xuyên became popular heroes among the inhabitants in the jungle. In 1936, Dương started his criminal activities by providing protection services to the Tây Ninh-Phnom Penh bus station in Saigon. By 1940, he had become a kingpin of South Vietnam. When the Empire of Japan invaded Vietnam in 1940, Ba Dương organized a dare-to-die group of youth to organize resistance to their occupation with his younger brother Năm Hà along with some "inferiors" Bảy Viễn, Mười Trí. When the Japanese surrendered in 1945, he cooperated with the Viet Minh against the Anglo-French reoccupation of the country.

== Death ==
In 1946, Dương lead a section of Bình Xuyên troops crossing the Soài Rạp River from Sát Forest to Bến Tre to help the An Hóa - Giao Hòa front. He was fatally wounded at 8:30 a.m. by a French air strike in Hồ Sen hamlet, Bình Thành commune, Giồng Trôm district, on February 20, 1946 (some documents said that Ba Dương was killed on February 7, 1946).

In 1948, Dương Văn Dương was posthumously promoted to Major General.

== Legacy ==
A street and high school in Ho Chi Minh City have been named after Dương.

The biggest canal in Tân Thạnh district, Long An was named after Dương Văn Dương.
