= French Cochinchina =

1862–1949 French colony in southern Vietnam

Colony of Cochinchina (1862–1946) Colonie de Cochinchine Xứ thuộc địa Nam Kỳ Autonomous Republic of Cochinchina (1946–1949) République autonome de Cochinchine Cộng hòa Tự trị Nam Kỳ
- 1862–1949
- Top: Colonial flag (1862-1946); Bottom: Autonomous republic flag (1946-1949) Coat of arms
- Motto: Liberté, égalité, fraternité "Liberty, Equality, Fraternity"
- Anthem: "La Marseillaise" "Chinh phụ ngâm khúc" (1946–1949)
- Localised version of the Great Seal of France

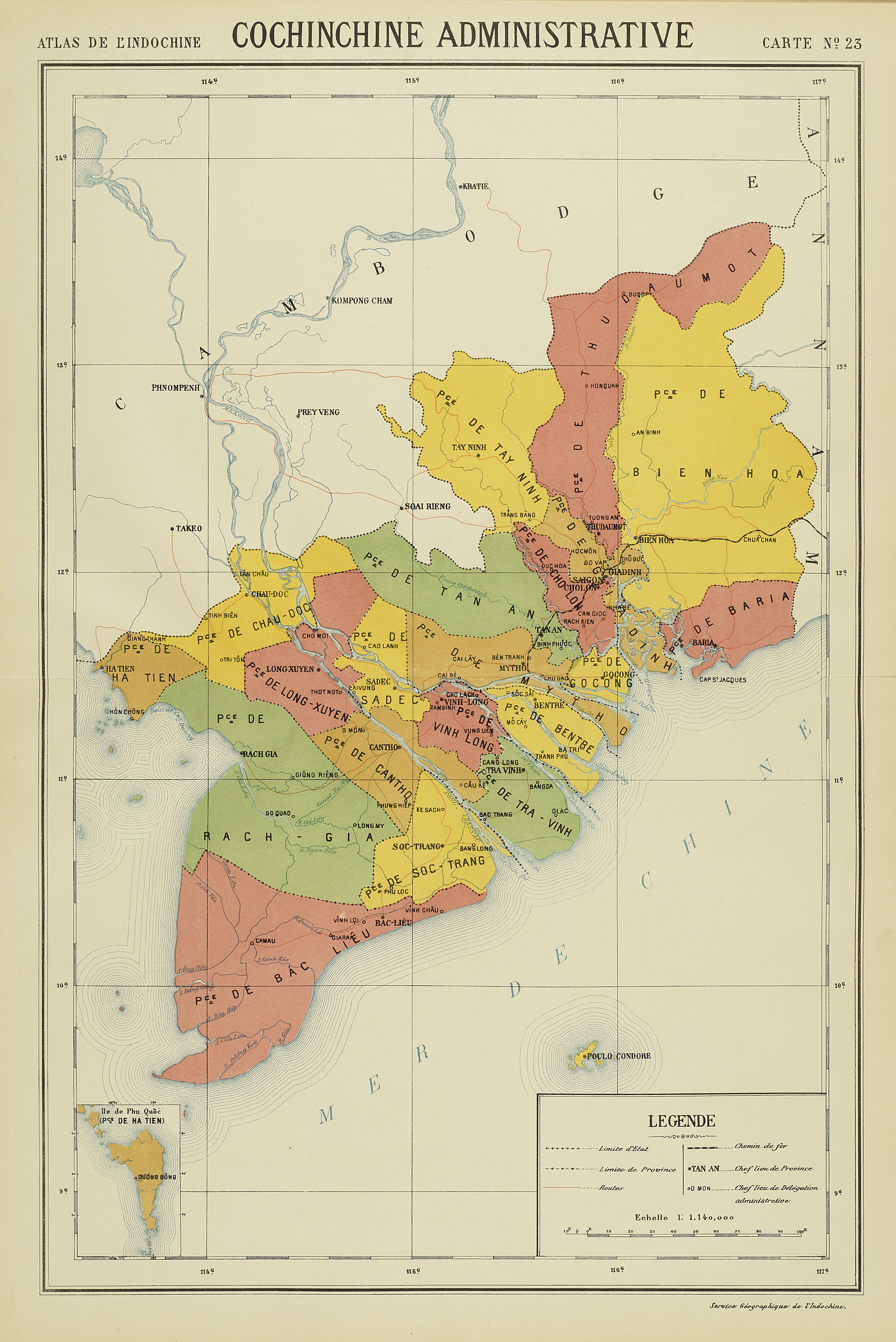
- Cochinchina in 1920
- Status: Colony of France (1862–1949); Constituent territory of French Indochina (1887–1949)
- Capital: Saigon (1862–1931); Saigon–Cholon (1931–1949) (Note: Saigon merged with Chợ Lớn on 27 April 1931 and was officially renamed to Saigon–Cholon, however the official name never entered everyday vernacular and the city continued to be referred to as ‘Saigon’.)
- Common languages: French; Vietnamese; Khmer; Chinese
- Religion: Buddhism; Hinduism; Confucianism; Taoism; Catholicism; Animism; Caodaism; Hòa Hảo; Islam
- Demonym: Cochinchinese
- Government: Dependent territory under direct colonial rule (1858–1946); Autonomous republic (1946–1949)
- Governor
  - 1858–1859: Charles Rigault de Genouilly
  - 1947–1949: Pierre Boyer De LaTour du Moulin
- President
  - 1946: Nguyen Van Thinh
  - 1947–1948: Nguyễn Văn Xuân
  - 1948-1949: Trần Văn Hữu
- Historical era: New Imperialism
  - Capture of Saigon: 17 February 1859
  - Ceded by Đại Nam: 5 June 1862
  - Part of French Indochina: 17 October 1887
  - Japanese occupation: 28 July 1941
  - Allied occupation: 1945–1946
  - Autonomous Republic of Cochinchina: 1 June 1946
  - Merged to Vietnam: 4 June 1949

Population
  - 1878: 1,657,500 (Note: Approximately 1.5 million Vietnamese, 100,000 Khmers, 36,000 Chinese, 10,000 Stiengs, 9,500 Chams, and 2,000 European residents.)
  - 1920: 3,800,000
- Currency: Vietnamese văn (1862–1945); Cochinchina piastre (1878–1885); French Indochinese piastre (1885–1949)
Preceded by	Succeeded by
Empire of Đại Nam	State of Vietnam
- Today part of: Vietnam

French Cochinchina (sometimes spelled Cochin-China; French: Cochinchine française; Vietnamese: Xứ thuộc địa Nam Kỳ, chữ Hán: 處屬地南圻) (Note: Nam Kỳ originated from the reign of Minh Mạng of the Nguyễn dynasty, but became a name associated with the French colonial period and so Vietnamese, especially nationalists, prefer the term Nam Phần to refer to Southern Vietnam.) was a colony of French Indochina from 1862 to 1949, encompassing the Mekong Delta and adjacent provinces in what is now the southern region of Vietnam, with its administrative capital in Saigon (present-day Ho Chi Minh City). In the face of recurring peasant unrest, and of growing political agitation in Saigon, the French operated a plantation economy whose primary strategic product was rubber.

After the end of the Japanese occupation (1941–1945) and the expulsion from Saigon of the Communist-led, nationalist Viet Minh in 1946, the territory was reorganized by the French as the Autonomous Republic of Cochinchina, a decision that helped trigger the First Indochina War. In a further move to deny the claims of the Democratic Republic of Vietnam declared in Hanoi by the Viet Minh, in June 1949 Cochinchina was united with the protectorates of Annam and Tonkin under their former de jure emperor Bảo Đại as the State of Vietnam within the French Union.

== History ==
=== French conquest ===
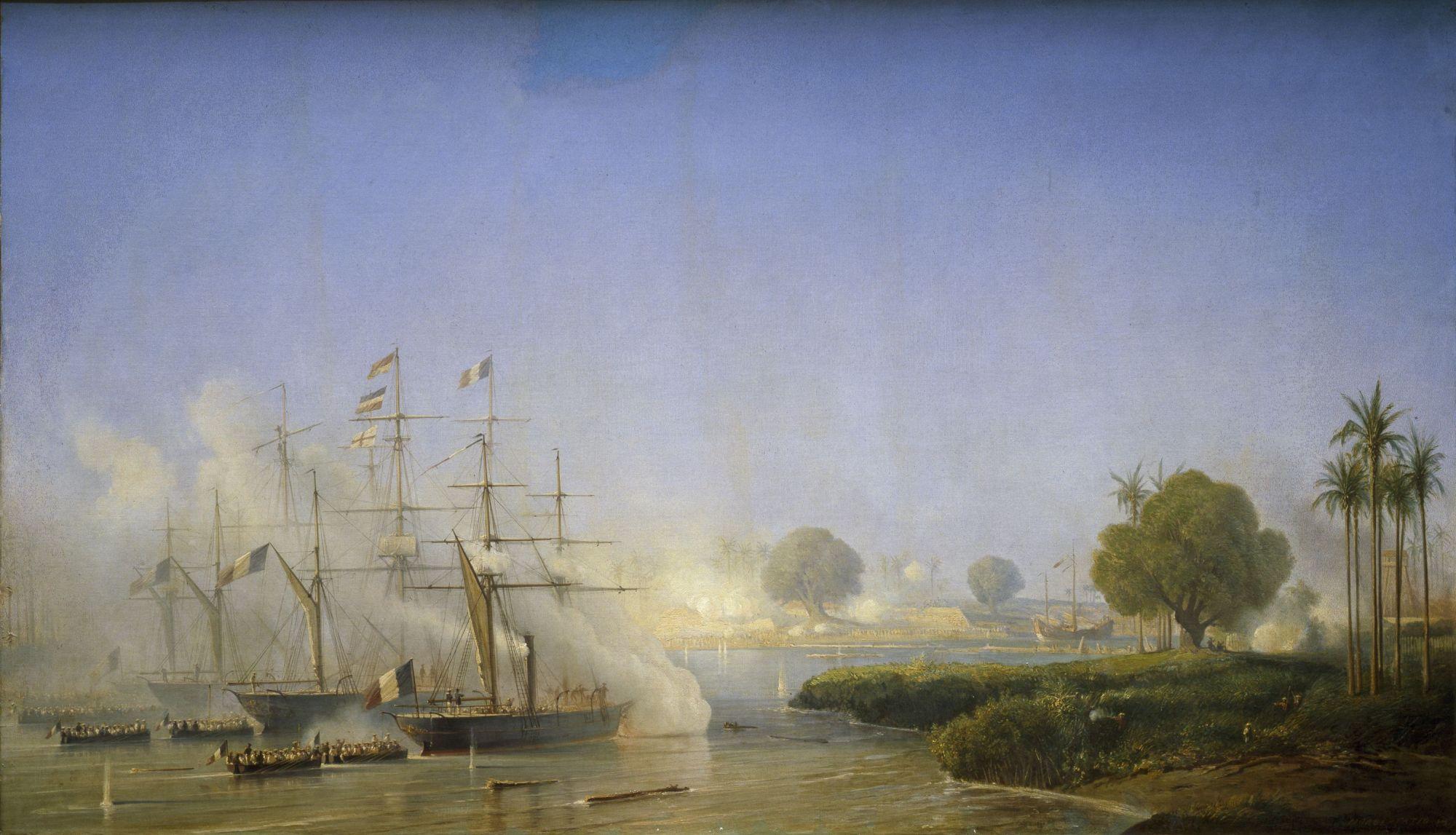
Capture of Saigon by France

In 1858, under the pretext of protecting the work of French Catholic missionaries, which the imperial Vietnamese Nguyễn dynasty increasingly regarded as a political threat, French Admiral Charles Rigault de Genouilly, with the assistance of Spanish forces from the Philippines, attacked Tourane (present-day Da Nang) in Annam. Early in 1859 he followed this up with an attack on Saigon, but as in Tourane was unable to seize territory outside of the defensive perimeter of the city. The Vietnamese siege of Saigon was not lifted until 1861, when additional French forces were able to advance across the Mekong Delta.

The Vietnamese conceded in 1862 and signed the Treaty of Saigon. This ensured the free practice of the Catholic religion, opened the Mekong Delta (and three ports in the north, in Tonkin) to trade, and ceded to France the provinces of Biên Hòa, Gia Định and Định Tường, three of Six Provinces of Southern Vietnam, along with the islands of Poulo Condore. In 1867, French Admiral Pierre de la Grandière forced the Vietnamese to surrender three additional provinces, Châu Đốc, Hà Tiên and Vĩnh Long. With these three additions all of southern Vietnam and the Mekong Delta fell under French control.

=== Consolidation of power ===
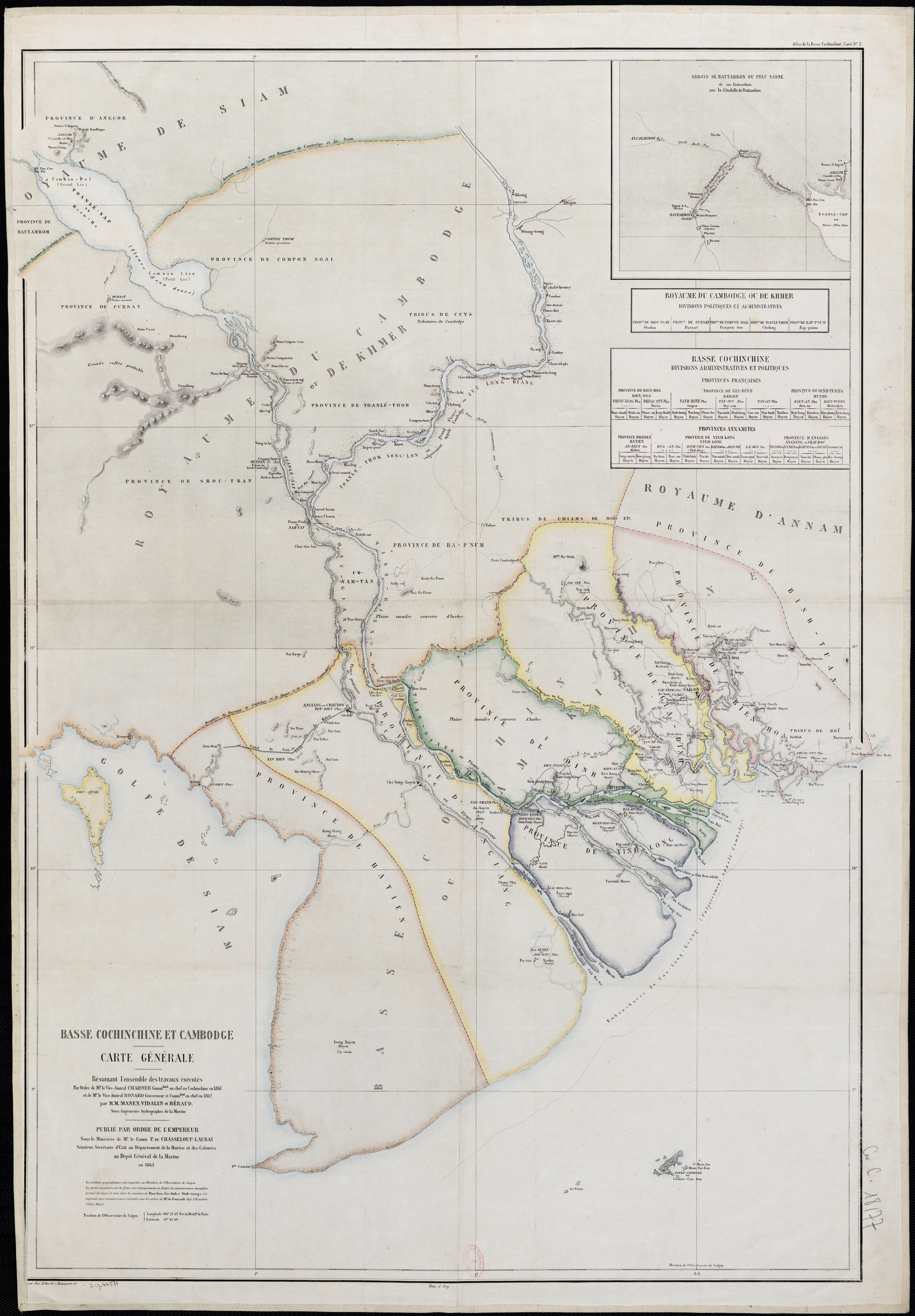
The six provinces of Lower Cochinchina, 1863.

In 1871 all the territories ceded to the French in southern Vietnam were incorporated as the colony of Cochinchina, with Admiral Dupré as its first governor.

In 1887, the colony became a federal member of the Union of French Indochina. Unlike the protectorates of Annam (central Vietnam) and Tonkin (northern Vietnam), Cochinchina was ruled directly by the French and represented by a deputy in the National Assembly in Paris.

Within Indochina, Cochinchina was the territory with the largest European population. At its height, in 1940, it had an estimated 16,550 Europeans, the vast majority living in Saigon.

=== Plantation economy ===
The French authorities dispossessed Vietnamese landowners and peasants to ensure European control of the expansion of rice and rubber production. By 1930, the French controlled more than a quarter of Cochinchina's farmlands. However, French-Vietnamese landlords remained intrinsically dominant in the Mekong Delta, which controlled most of the region's farm ownership and rice productions. The French began rubber production in Cochinchina in 1907, seeking a share of the monopoly profits that the British were earning from their plantations in Malaya. Investment from metropolitan France was encouraged by large land grants allowing for rubber cultivation on an industrial scale. Virgin rainforests in eastern Cochinchina, the highly fertile "red lands", were cleared for the new export crop.

These developments contributed to the 1916 Cochinchina uprising. Insurgents attempted to storm Saigon central prison, and maintained a prolonged resistance in the Mekong Delta. Fifty-one of them were hanged.

As they expanded in response to the increased rubber demand after the First World War, the European plantations recruited, as indentured labour, workers from "the overcrowded villages of the Red River Delta in Tonkin and the coastal lowlands of Annam". These migrants, despite Sûreté efforts at political screening, brought south the influence of the Communist Party of Nguyen Ai Quoc (Ho Chi Minh), and of other underground nationalist parties (the Tan Viet and Việt Nam Quốc Dân Đảng). At the same time, the local peasantry were driven into debt servitude, and into plantation labour, by land and poll taxes. By 1930, 80% of rice farmland was owned by 25% of landowners, and 57% of the rural population were landless peasants working on large estates. This combination of factors led to widespread and recurring unrest and strikes. Phú ("Red") Riềng Đỏ, a communist-instigated protest by 1,300 labourers on a sprawling Michelin rubber plantation near Phú Riềng in the Biên Hòa Province was suppressed only after a one-week armed standoff.

In response to rural unrest and growing labour militancy in Saigon, the French authorities detained, between 1930 and 1932, more than 12,000 political prisoners, of whom 88 were guillotined, and almost 7,000 sentenced to prison or hard labour in penal colonies.

=== Popular Front promise of reform ===
In 1936, the formation in France of the Popular Front government led by Leon Blum was accompanied by promises of colonial reform. In Cochinchina the new governor-general of Indochina Jules Brévié, sought to defuse the tense and expectant political situation by amnestying political prisoners and easing restrictions on the press, political parties, and trade unions.

Saigon witnessed further unrest culminating in general dock and transport strikes in the summer of 1937. In April of that year, the Communist Party and their Trotskyist left opposition ran a common slate for the municipal elections, with both their respective leaders Nguyễn Văn Tạo and Tạ Thu Thâu winning seats. The exceptional anti-colonial unity of the left, however, was split by the lengthening shadow of the Moscow Trials and growing protest over the failure of the Communist-supported Popular Front to deliver constitutional reform. Colonial Minister Marius Moutet, a socialist, commented that he had sought "a wide consultation with all elements of the popular [will]," but with "Trotskyist-Communists intervening in the villages to menace and intimidate the peasant section of the population, taking all authority from the public officials," the necessary "formula" had not been found.

=== War and the Insurrection of 1940 ===
In the April 1939 Cochinchina Council elections, Tạ Thu Thâu led a "Workers' and Peasants' Slate" into victory over both the moderate Constitutionalists and the Communists' Democratic Front. Key to their success was popular opposition to the war taxes ("national defence levy") that the Communist Party, in the spirit of the Franco-Soviet accord, had felt obliged to support. Brévié set the election results aside and wrote to Colonial Minister Georges Mandel: "the Trotskyists under the leadership of Ta Thu Thau want to take advantage of a possible war in order to win total liberation." The Stalinists, on the other hand, are "following the position of the Communist Party in France" and "will thus be loyal if war breaks out."

With the Molotov–Ribbentrop Pact of 23 August 1939, the local Communists were ordered by Moscow to return to direct confrontation with the French. Under the slogan "Land to the tillers, freedom for the workers and independence for Vietnam", the Communist Party in Cochinchina instigated a widespread insurrection in November 1940. The revolt did not penetrate Saigon, as an attempted uprising in the city was quelled within a day. In the Mekong Delta fighting continued until the end of the year.

=== Japanese occupation ===
After a brief cross-border confrontation with French forces in September 1940, Japanese forces occupied Tonkin. On 9 December 1940, an agreement was reached with the Vichy government whereby French sovereignty over its army and administrative affairs was confirmed, but Japanese forces were free to fight the war against the Allies from Indochinese soil. A large scale movement of troops did not occur until after the Nazi invasion of the Soviet Union in late June 1941. With the Soviets tied down, the high command concluded that a "strike south" would solve the problems posed for Japan by the American-led oil embargo. To prepare for an invasion of the oil-rich Dutch East Indies, some 140,000 Japanese troops occupied southern French Indochina on 28 July 1941.

French troops and the civil administration were allowed to remain, albeit under Japanese supervision. While the Japanese government's policy of “maintaining peace” in Indochina limited interactions between the Japanese and Vietnamese, the contradiction of mutual coexistence between France, as the “missionary of civilisation,” and Japan, as the “liberator of Asia” from Western colonialism, could not be concealed. The tensions contributed to nationalist, anti-colonial feeling. Drawing on the local Coadaist sect, the Japanese began to encourage nationalist groups in Cohinchina from 1943.

Following the liberation of Paris in 1944, Japan increasingly suspected that the French authorities would assist Allied operations. In March 1945, a Japanese coup d'état in French Indochina took the Europeans into custody and imposed their direct authority. The coup had, in the words of diplomat Jean Sainteny, "wrecked a colonial enterprise that had been in existence for 80 years." In August 1945, as they faced defeat, the Japanese belatedly created a puppet state, incorporating Cochinchina in the Empire of Vietnam under the nominal authority of the Bảo Đại.

=== The August Revolution and the return of French rule ===
On 2 September 1945, in Hanoi, Ho Chi Minh and his new Front for the Independence of Vietnam, the Viet Minh, proclaimed the Democratic Republic of Vietnam. Already on 24 August the Viet Minh had declared a provisional government (a Southern Administrative Committee) in Saigon. When, for the declared purpose of disarming the Japanese, the Viet Minh accommodated the landing and strategic positioning of their wartime "democratic allies", the British, rival political groups turned out in force, including the syncretic Hoa Hao and Cao Dai sects. On 7 and 8 September 1945, in the delta city of Cần Thơ, the committee had to rely on the Jeunesse d'Avant-Garde / Thanh Niên Tiền Phong (Vanguard Youth), who had contributed to civil defence and policing under Japanese. They fired upon crowds demanding arms against the French.

In Saigon, the violence of a French restoration assisted by British and surrendered Japanese troops triggered a general uprising on 23 September. In the course of what became known as the Southern Resistance War (Nam Bộ kháng chiến) the Viet Minh defeated rival resistance forces, executing their leading cadres, but, by the end of 1945, had been pushed out of Saigon and major urban centres into the countryside.

=== Incorporation into the State of Vietnam ===
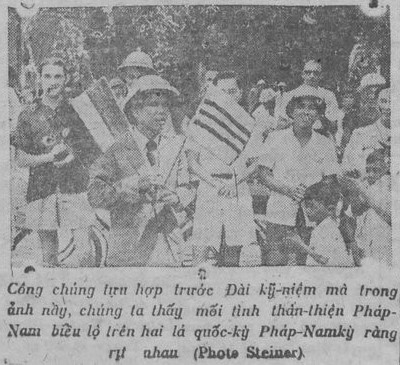
Celebrations of the inauguration of Autonomous Republic of Cochinchina, June 1946, Saigon. A man waves the French tricolour and the three-striped Cochinchina flag.

On 1 June 1946, while the Viet Minh leadership was in France for negotiations, at the initiative of High Commissioner d'Argenlieu and in violation of the 6 March Ho–Sainteny agreement, a local territorial assembly proclaimed an "Autonomous Republic". War between France and the Viet Minh began shortly afterwards. Nguyễn Văn Thinh, the first head of its government, died in an apparent suicide in November 1946. He was succeeded by Lê Văn Hoạch, a member of the caodaist sect. In 1947, Nguyễn Văn Xuân replaced Lê and renamed the "Provisional Government of the Autonomous Republic of Cochinchina" as the "Provisional Government of Southern Vietnam", suggesting that his aim was to reunite the whole country.

The next year, the Provisional Central Government of Vietnam was proclaimed with the merger of Annam and Tonkin: Xuân became its Prime minister and left office in Cochinchina, where he was replaced by Trần Văn Hữu. Xuân and the French had agreed to reunite Vietnam, but Cochinchina posed a problem because of its ill-defined legal status. The reunification was opposed by the French colonists, who were still influential on the Cochinchinese council, and by Southern Vietnamese autonomists. Together they delayed the process of reunification by arguing that Cochinchina was still legally a colony – as its new status as a republic had never been ratified by the French National Assembly – and that any territorial change therefore required the approval of the French parliament. Xuân issued a by-law reuniting Cochinchina with the rest of Vietnam, but it was overruled by the Cochinchinese council.

Cochinchina remained separated from the rest of Vietnam for over a year, while former Emperor Bảo Đại – whom the French wanted to bring back to power as a political alternative to Ho Chi Minh – refused to return to Vietnam and take office as head of state until the country was fully reunited. On 14 March 1949, the French National Assembly voted a law permitting the creation of a Territorial Assembly of Cochinchina. This new Cochinchinese parliament was elected on 10 April 1949, with the Vietnamese representatives then becoming a majority. On 23 April, the Territorial Assembly approved the merger of the Provisional Government of Southern Vietnam with the Provisional Central Government of Vietnam. The decision was in turn approved by the French National Assembly on 20 May, and the merger was effective on 4 June. The State of Vietnam was then proclaimed, with Bảo Đại as head of state.

== Administration ==
=== Government ===
Following the French colonial invasion, Vietnamese mandarins withdrew from Cochinchina, leading the French to adopt a policy of direct rule.

The highest office in the government of French Cochinchina was the Governor of Cochinchina (統督南圻, Thống đốc Nam Kỳ), who after 1887 reported directly to the Governor-General of French Indochina. As French Cochinchina was a directly-ruled colony, the French colonial apparatus operated at every level of government including at the provincial, district, and communal levels.

Each Cochinchinese province was headed by a French official with the title of "Chủ tỉnh" (主省) or "Tỉnh trưởng" (省長). These officials had similar roles and responsibilities as the equivalent French "Công sứ" (公使) had in the provinces of the Nguyễn dynasty. The provinces of French Cochinchina were further divided into districts known as "Tong" and headed by a "Chanh tong", and the districts in turn were further divided into communes known as "xã" (社), headed by a "Huong ca". Both the district and commune chiefs were salaried employees of the French colonial administration.

=== Laws ===
During the early periods of French rule in Cochinchina, both French laws and Nguyễn dynasty laws applied and offenders of both faced trial in French courts. Initially French people were tried using French laws and Vietnamese people (then known as "Annamese people") were tried using the Nguyễn dynasty's laws, alongside a new set of provisions that the French had introduced for their colonial subjects. The French courts applied their rulings based on the two different legal systems. After the French consolidation of power, the Nguyễn dynasty's laws were completely abolished in Cochinchina and only French laws applied in the colony.

On 6 January 1903, the Governor-General of French Indochina Jean Baptiste Paul Beau issued a decree that stated that offences for both French and indigenous laws would go to French courts and that offenders would only be tried against French Cochinchina's penal code. During this period the Governor-General of French Indochina also issued a decree that introduced new laws to fine people for a number of common offences outside of the French penal code.

== Gallery ==
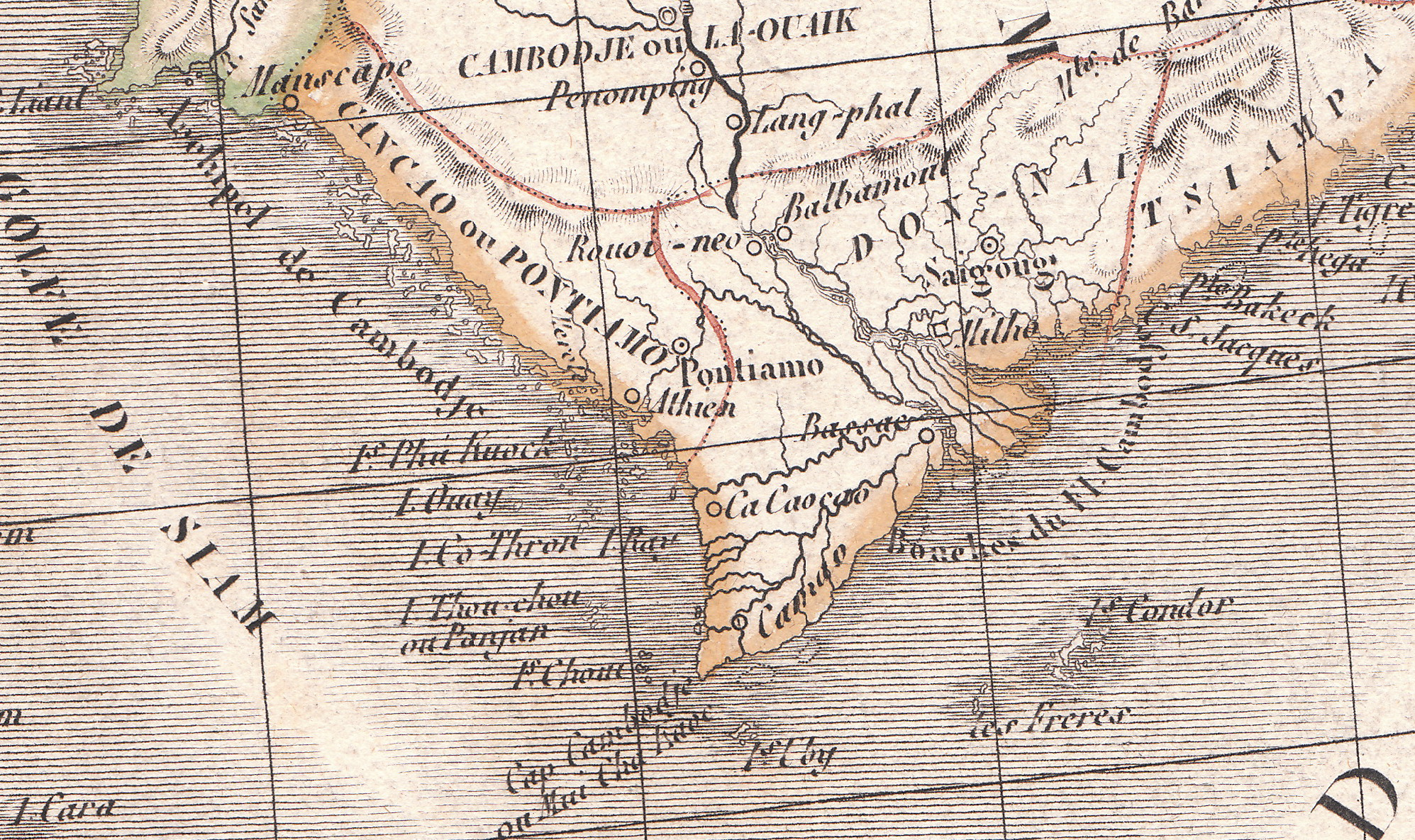
Cochinchina in 1829 under Nguyễn Dynasty

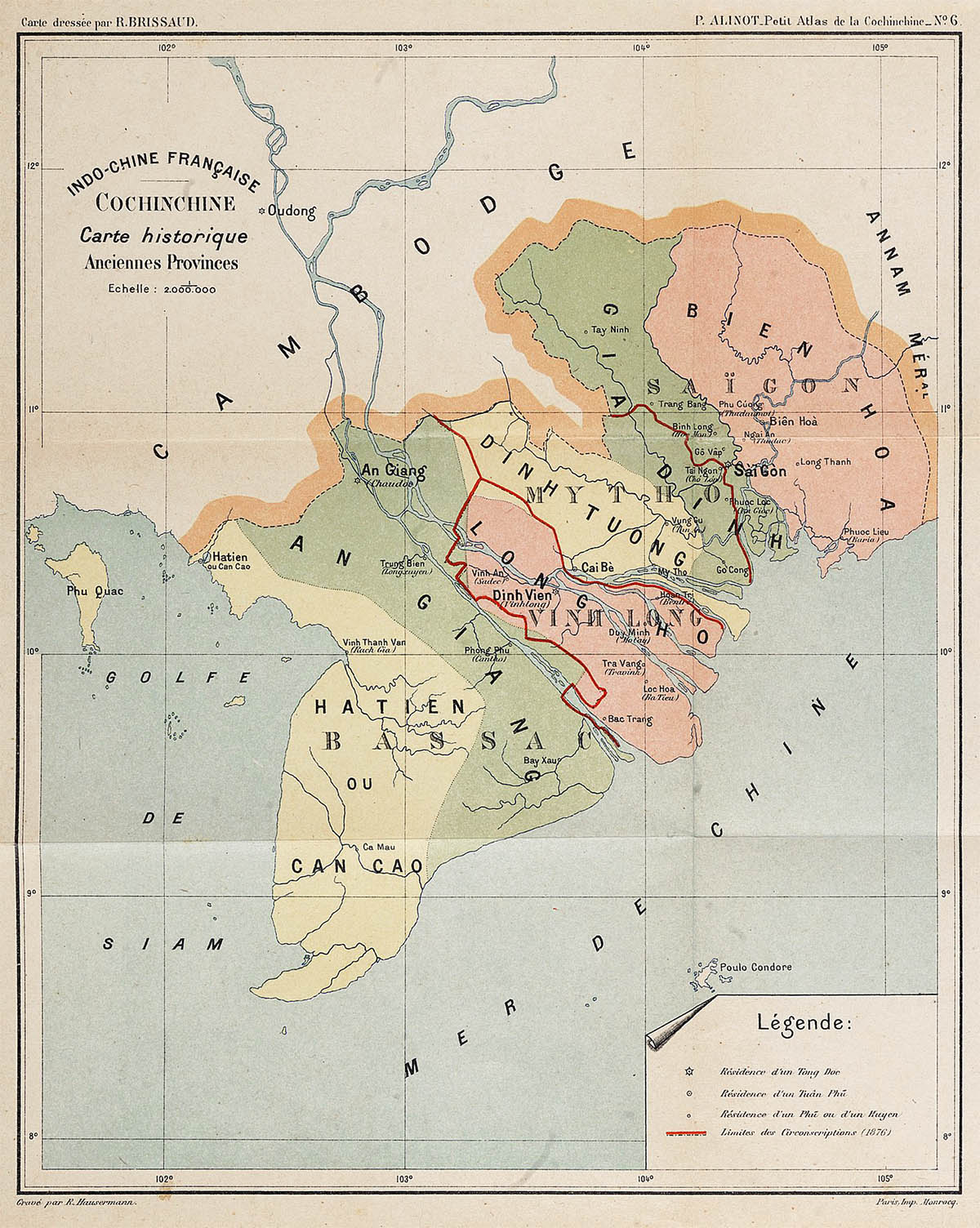
Cochinchina in 1876

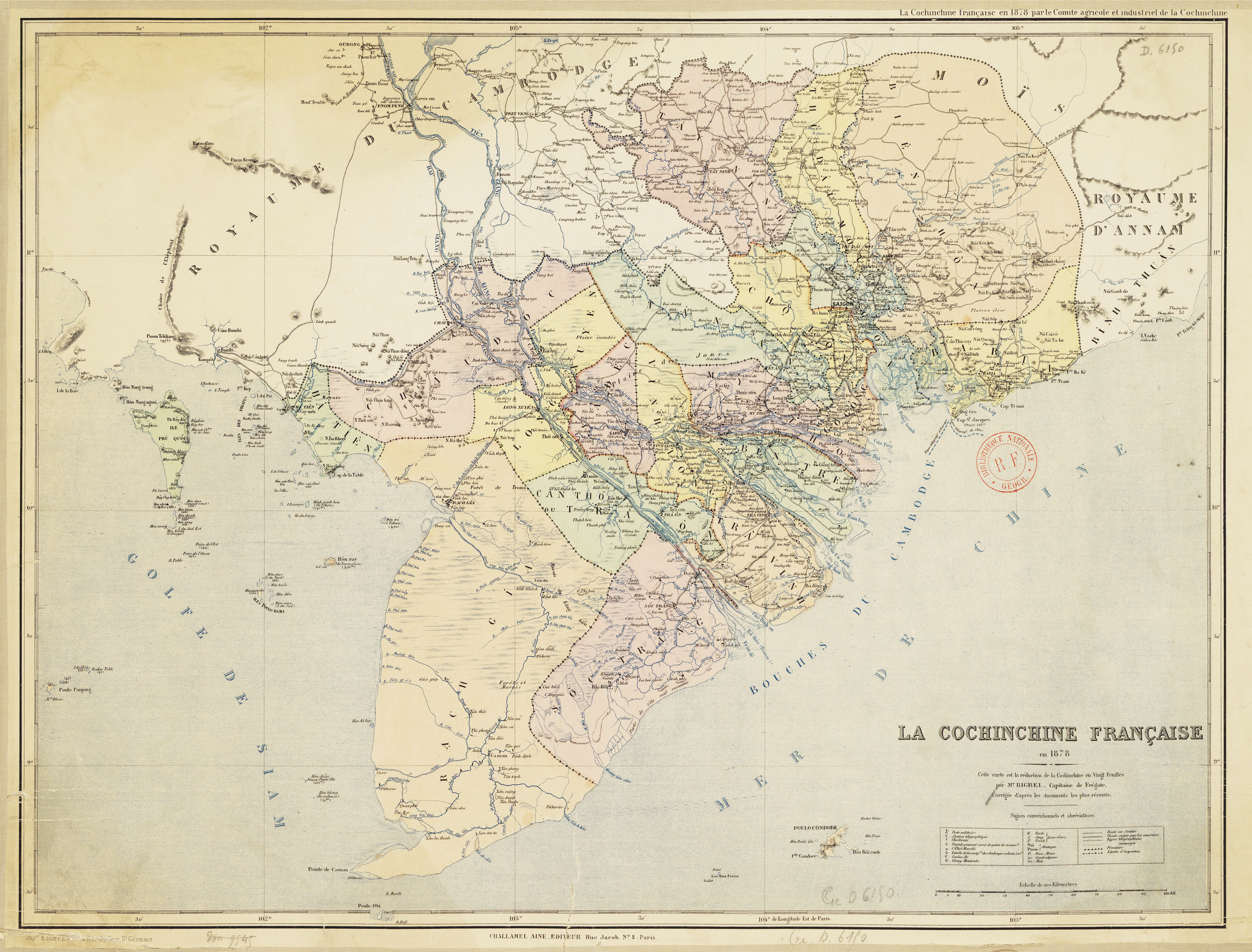
Cochinchina in 1878

Cochinchina in 1882

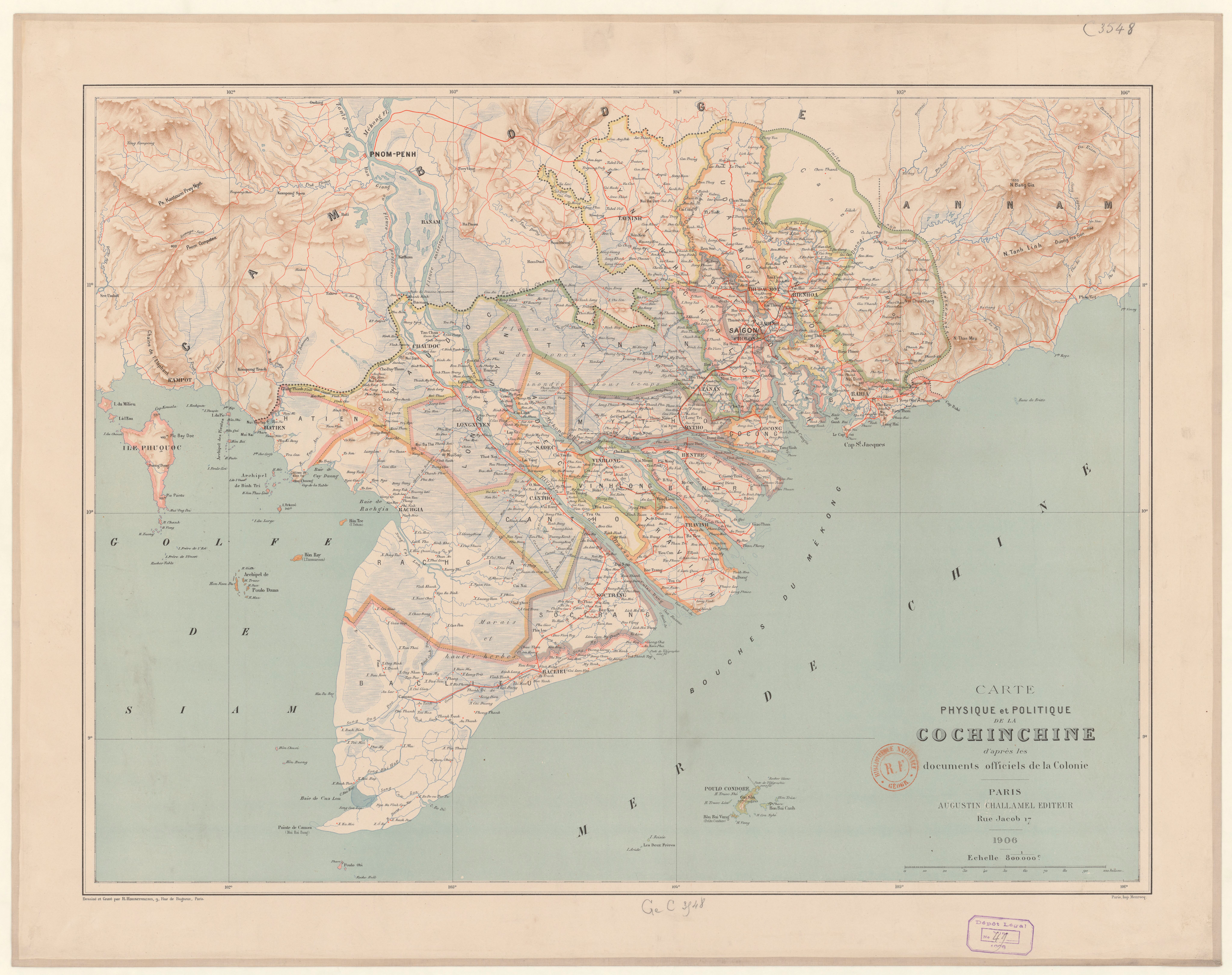
Cochinchina in 1906

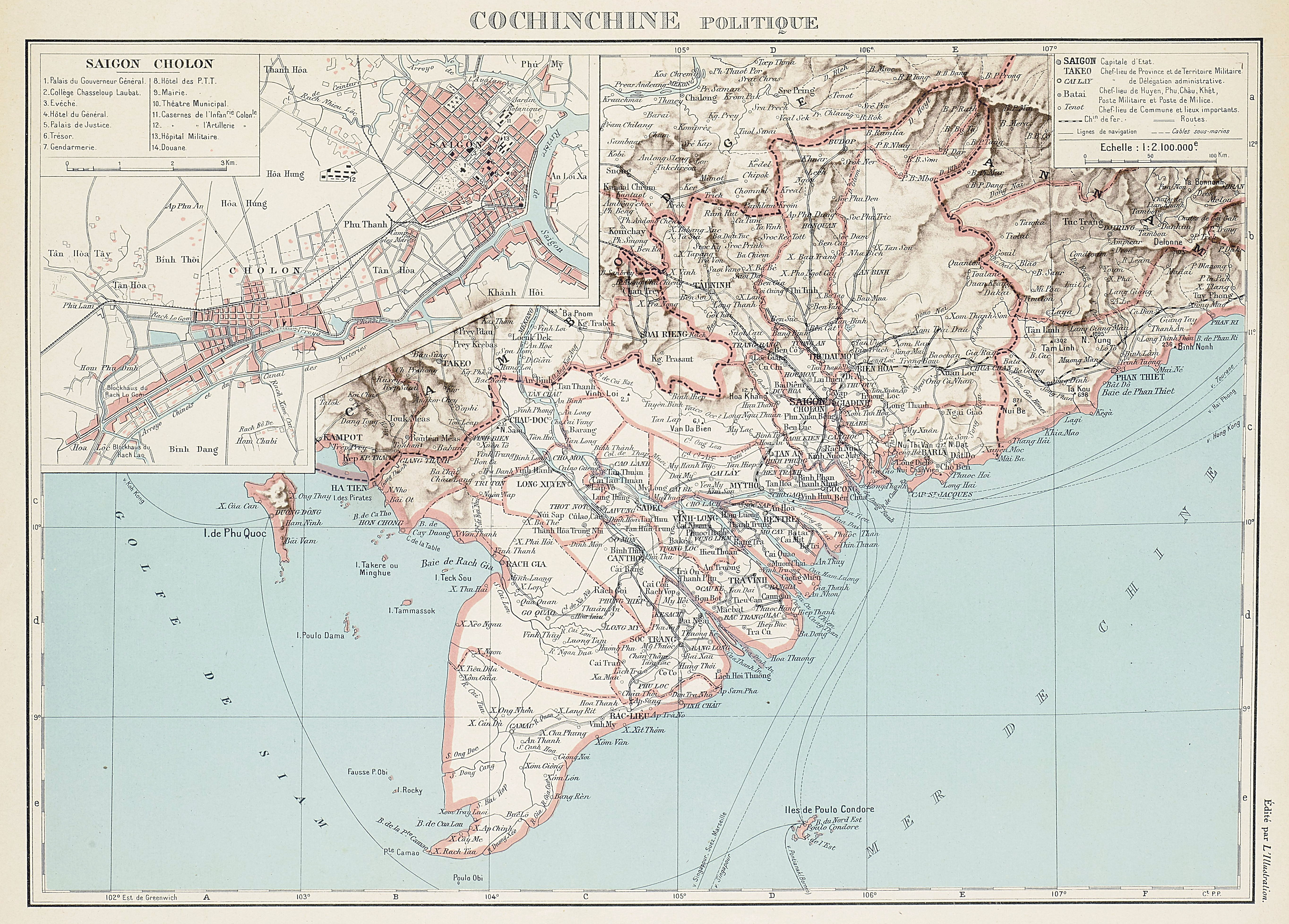
Cochinchina in 1929

== See also ==
- Cochinchina
- French Indochina
- Charles Antoine François Thomson
- List of administrators of the French colony of Cochinchina
- Cochinchina campaign
- State of Vietnam
- Land reform in South Vietnam
