= Jean-Gabriel Domergue =

French painter (1889–1962)

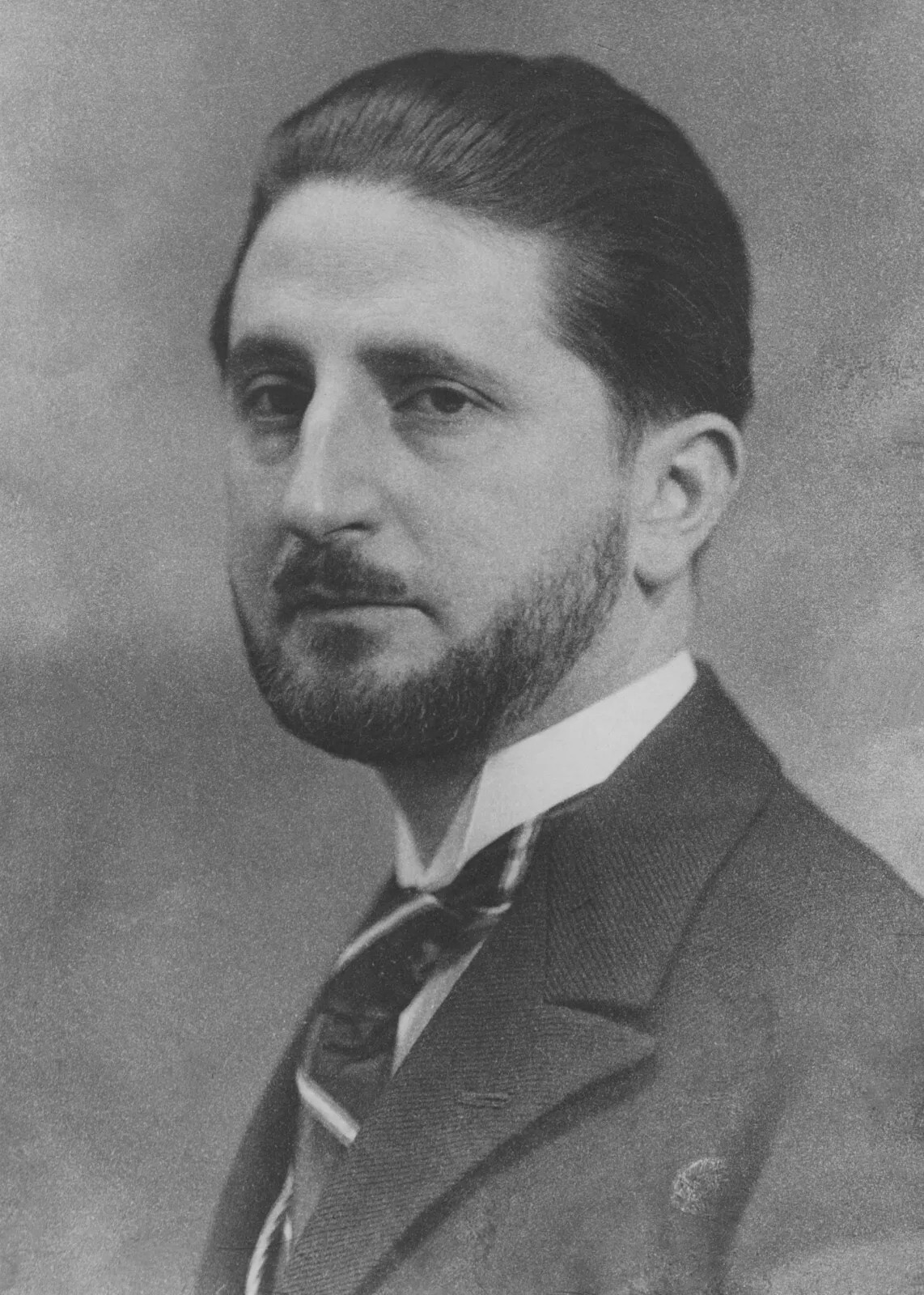
- Domergue, c. 1929
- Born: 4 March 1889; Bordeaux, France
- Died: 16 November 1962 (aged 73); Paris, France
- Education: École nationale supérieure des Beaux-Arts
- Known for: Portraits of Parisian women
- Awards: Prix de Rome, Chevalier of the Légion d'honneur, Fellow of the Academy of Fine Arts

Jean-Gabriel Domergue (4 March 1889 in Bordeaux; 16 November 1962 in Paris) was a French draughtsman, painter, poster artist, printmaker and illustrator specialising in portraits of the chic Parisian women. For 40 years, he was the inspiration and magician of the grandest celebrations, guiding the elite of Paris, London and New York. He lived partly in Cannes on the Côte d'Azur with his wife, the sculptress Odette Maugendre-Villers (1884–1973), their Villa Fiesole in the quarter of La Californie is listed as a historical monument.

== Biography ==
Domergue was born in Bordeaux to a wealthy family, son of Gabriel Domergue. His brother, René Domergue (1892–1988), was a writer, art critic, and later editor at La Liberté and L'Écho de Paris. The painter Henri de Toulouse-Lautrec was his second cousin. Domergue attended the Lycée Montaigne in Bordeaux and then the Lycée Rollin in Paris. He was passionate about drawing and entered the École nationale supérieure des Beaux-Arts in Paris, where he studied under Jules Joseph Lefebvre, Tony Robert-Fleury, Jules Adler, Ferdinand Humbert, and François Flameng.

In 1911, he was a winner of the Prix de Rome. From the 1920s onward he concentrated on portraits, and claimed to be "the inventor of the pin-up". He declared: "my first pin-up dates back to 1912".

Domergue organised famous Parisian gala events, such as The Venetian Ball at the Opera in 1922. He also designed numerous dresses, hats, and accessories for famous couturiers, such as Paul Poiret and Henry Marque.

Domergue settled in 1926 in the heart of a pine forest on a slope overlooking the bay of Cannes located in the quarter of La Californie. There he built a luxury Art deco villa he called "Fiesole" with the French architects Charles Nicod and Émile Molinié. For the landscaping with terraced gardens, ponds and waterfalls he drew inspiration from Renaissance gardens, particularly those of the Villa Gamberaia and the Villa Farnese in Caprarola. In there is the sumptuous Villa Fiesole, Domergue and his wife hosted lavish receptions for many years, contributing to the rise of Cannes. The property was bequeathed to the city of Cannes in 1973 by his widow, who sculpted their effigies in the Etruscan style, inspired by those of Cerveteri, for the tomb where their remains were transferred in 1998. For 20 years the jury of the annual Cannes Film Festival met in the villa to pick the winners.

On 14 July 1933, he was Domergue was appointed a Chevalier of the Légion d'honneur. In 1936/38, he was a member of the jury of the Miss France pageant. In 1939, he created a poster for the debut Cannes film festival, which was interrupted in September 1939 due to the outbreak of World War II and the General mobilization.

From 1955 until 1962 he was the curator of the Musée Jacquemart-André, organising exhibitions of the paintings of Vincent van Gogh, Toulouse-Lautrec, Francisco Goya and others.

He died 16 November 1962 on a sidewalk of the 8th arrondissement of Paris.

== Portraits of personalities he painted (selection) ==
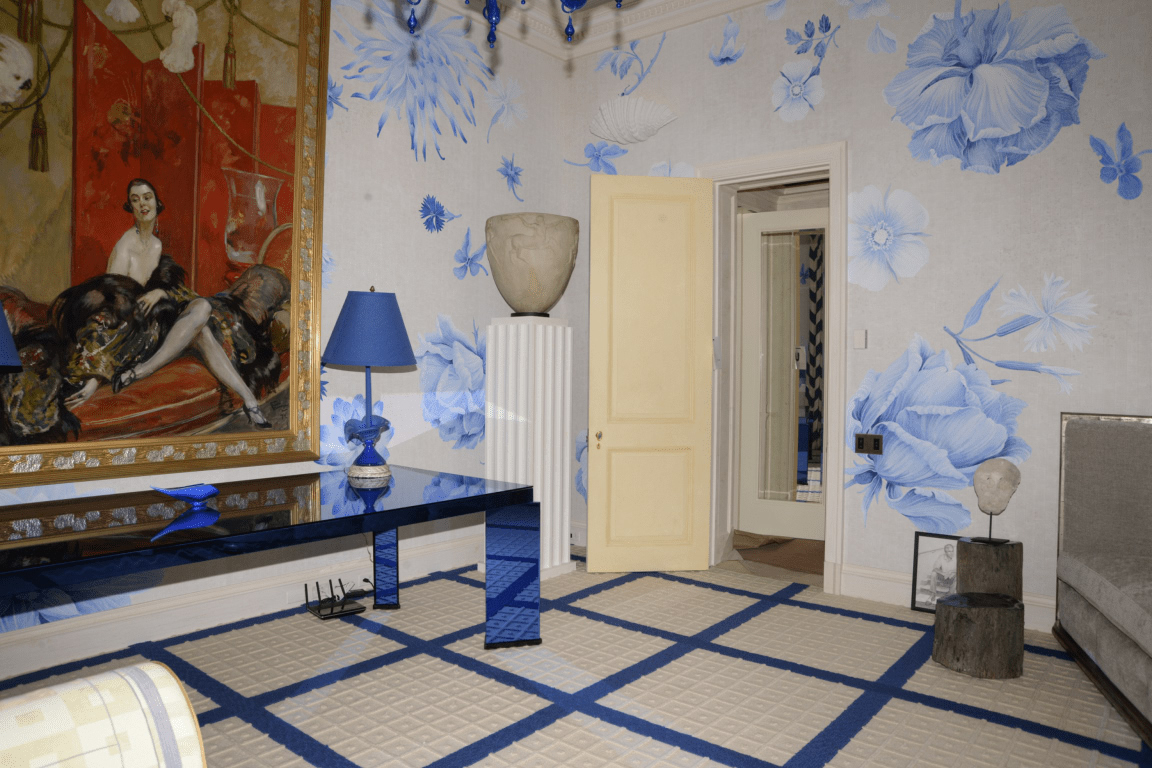
Mlle Spinelly, Portrait of Andrée Spinelly by Jean Gabriel Domergue in Jeffrey Epstein's Manhattan townhouse, the Herbert N. Straus House, 6 July 2019

Joséphine Baker – Brigitte Bardot – Lucienne Boyer – Mylène Demongeot – Mrs Olympe Hériot – Liane de Pougy – Andrée Spinelly – Lady Owen – Gina Mascetti – the Duchess of Grammont – Princess Lucien Murat – Cécile Sorel – Yvonne de Bray – Virginie Heriot – the Countess of Chanbrun – Mrs André Peseire – Mrs Meyer Rigaud – Miss Arlette Boucard – Miss Parisys – Miss de Lespinasse – Gina Lollobrigida – Mrs Arnaud de Lestapis – Miss Philipou – Dora Duby – the Dolly Sisters – the singer Bagheera Kipling – Anouk Ferjac – Linda Vandal – Sophie Desmarets – Colette Antony – the pianist Magda Tagliaferro – Dorothy Dickson – Vega Vinci – Michèle Morgan – Countess of Farges – Nadine Tellier, who married Edmond de Rothschild.

Men were also keen to have their portrait painted by the fashionable painter, among the most famous: Prime Minister Joseph Caillaux – Alexander Clavel – Prime Minister Georges Clemenceau – General Frédéric-Georges Herr – the Duke of Rohan – Edward VIII – Franklin D. Roosevelt.

== Awards ==
- Knight of the Legion of Honour
- Fellow of the Academy of Fine Arts.

== See also ==
- Gazette du Bon Ton

== Books ==
- Soyer, Gerard-Louis (1984). Jean-Gabriel Domergue, l'art et la mode (in French). Editions Sous le vent. ISBN 285889034X.
