= Adrienne Górska =

Polish architect

Adrienne Górska (Polish: Adrianna Gurwik-Górska; 1899, Moscow — 1969, Beaulieu-sur-Mer) was a Polish architect who worked in the Modernist and Art Deco styles in Paris between the world wars. She was one of the few women of her day to receive a university diploma in architecture.

== Biography ==
She was born as Adrianna Gurwik-Górska in 1899 in Moscow. In 1919, Górska emigrated together with her Polish family to Paris, where she studied under Robert Mallet-Stevens at the École Spéciale d'Architecture in Montparnasse. Graduating in 1924, she became one of the few women of her times to have an architectural diploma.

She designed an apartment and studio in Paris for her sister, the painter Tamara de Lempicka, which she fitted out with chrome-plated furniture. She then worked with Sarah Lipska on the well-received renovation of a farmhouse for the American Barbara Harrison converting the barn into a dining-room and finishing the bathroom in orange, yellow, and gold mosaics. Writing in London's The Architect and Building News in 1930, Howard Roberston and Frank Yerbury commented: "One might suggest that modernism was ruthless, even brutal, and that these attributes are masculine. But we have evidence in a series of striking modern interiors, that women are equally responding to the urge for modern expression."

Górska took up employment with the architectural firm Molinié et Nicod, where she met Pierre de Montaut, whom she married around 1939. They became known for the modern cinemas they designed for the Cinéac group. By 1932, Górska was a full member of the influential French Union of Modern Artists. In 1937, she received a commission for the Polish pavilion at the Exposition Internationale des Arts et Techniques dans la Vie Moderne.

After her sister Tamara left for the United States in the summer of 1939, Górska and her husband left for Poland to design newsreel cinemas for Pathé Nathan, but returned to France at the end of August just before the German invasion of Poland.

Górska's worklist stops abruptly around that time but her niece Maria Krystyna "Kizette" de Lempicka remembers her funeral in southern France in 1969.

== See also ==
- Tamara de Lempicka
- Pierre de Montaut

== Literature ==
- "Adrienne Górska de Montaut" in Byars, Mel (2004). The Design Encyclopedia with references, New York: The Museum of Modern Art. | ISBN 0-87070-012-X
- Jean-Jacques Meusy, "Cinéac: un concept, une architecture", Les Cahiers de la Cinémathèque, n°66, 1997, pp. 91–121.
- Pierre de Montaut et Adrienne Górska, Vingt salles de cinéma, préface de Germaine Kellerson, Société française d'éditions, 1937.
