= Sarah Lipska =

French artist and designer (1882–1973)

- Lipska in 1908
- Born: 7 December 1882; Mława, Poland
- Died: 28 November 1973 (aged 90); Paris, France
- Known for: Painting, sculpture, interior decorating, fashion design, costume and stage design
- Movement: Modernism
- Spouse: Xawery Dunikowski (unmarried)

Sarah Lipska (1882–1973), was a French painter, sculptor, stylist, and interior designer of Polish origin. She worked in Paris, her adopted city, from 1912 until her death.

== Early life ==
Lipska was born on 7 December 1882, into a wealthy Hasidic Jewish family in Mława, in what is now the Masovian Voivodeship of Poland. She studied at the Warsaw School of Fine Arts between 1904 and 1907, as one of its first intake of students that included Tadeusz Pruszkowski. Her sculpture professor was Xawery Dunikowski, the father of her daughter, Xavera, born in Brussels in 1908. Lipska is sometimes referred to as Dunikowski's muse, remaining in contact with him throughout his life. During 1906, she travelled to Syria and Palestine. In 1912, she exhibited at the Zachęta – National Gallery of Art in Warsaw, the only woman among the exhibitors, showing a pastel drawing, Gołębie (Doves), which was later exhibited in Berlin. This was the only known work that clearly references her Jewish heritage. Towards the end of 1912 she left Poland and moved to Paris on a permanent basis. Why she took this decision remains unclear. It may have been due to rising antisemitism in Poland, the attractions of Parisian bohemianism, or a desire to leave Dunikowski.

== Career ==
After WWI, she exhibited at the 1919 Salon d'Automne in Paris. She collaborated with the Russian painter, Léon Bakst, on scene and costume design for Serge Diaghilev's Ballets Russes, sometimes being referred to as Bakst's pupil. She produced a bust of Diaghilev, which is now in the Bibliothèque-Musée de l'Opéra National de Paris. She also designed numerous costumes for other ballets and theatrical works. From 1924, she collaborated with the Myrbor fashion house, founded by Marie Cuttoli, creating fabric and interior design sketches. In 1925, she participated in the International Exhibition of Modern Decorative and Industrial Arts, held in Paris, winning a gold medal for her embroidered tapestries. She collaborated with Adrienne Górska, sister of the artist, Tamara de Lempicka, on the interior design of the home of the American heiress and publisher Barbara Harrison Wescott in Paris. In 1929, she designed the interior of the mansion of Antoine de Paris (Antoni Cierplikowski), who was known as the world's first celebrity hairdresser. She was one of the first to use glass in all its forms in interior design, including thick industrial glasses, and also used raw aluminium. This placed her firmly among the era's avant-garde designers.

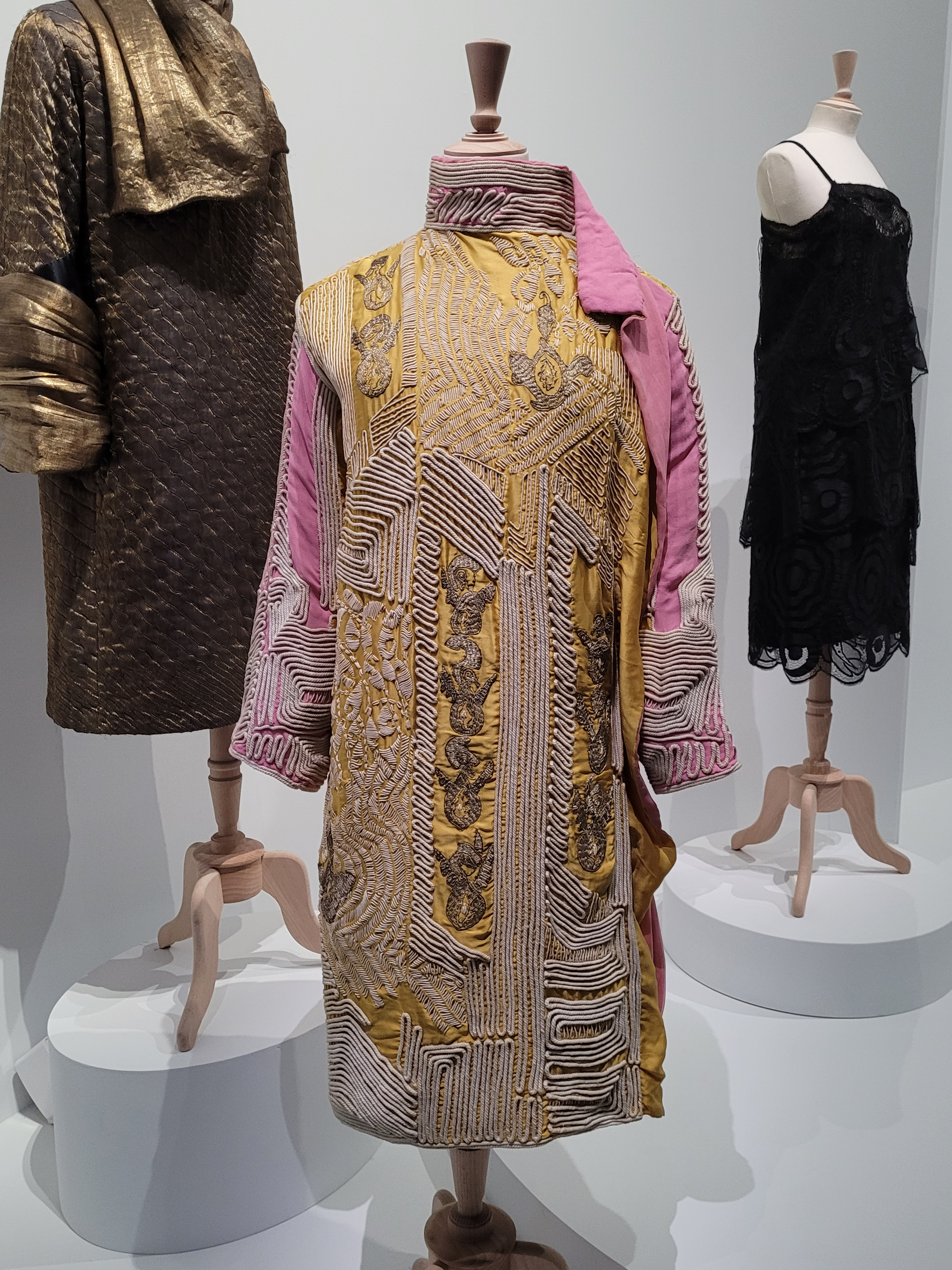
"Yellow coat with standing collar" by Lipska

Lipska opened a boutique to display her artwork, furniture, and haute couture clothing in Montparnasse, Paris in 1924. This was originally intended to have been in partnership with Bakst, but he died in that year. By 1928 the boutique had moved to the prestigious Champs-Élysées. She also opened one in Monte Carlo. Clients for her clothes included the cosmetics entrepreneur Helena Rubinstein, actresses Alla Nazimova and Cécile Sorel, and American opera singer Ganna Walska. She also designed shop windows, advertising, perfume bottles and packaging for Rubinstein. Inspired by Asian clothing, her creations included embroideries decorated with stones, pearls and golden threads. She painted portraits and sculpted many busts and bas-reliefs. In her sculpture she often experimented with different mediums, using synthetic resin, copper leaf, glass and pearls, while modelling in clay as well as carving in wood. Among those who modelled for her were Rubinstein, the fashion designer, Paul Poiret, and the composer, Edgard Varèse. In 1931, she presented a tapestry for the Paris Colonial Exposition and in 1937, she exhibited The Bird and the Airplane at the Exposition Internationale des Arts et Techniques dans la Vie Moderne in Paris, and won the gold medal.

During WW2, she went into hiding, to avoid capture and being sent to a concentration camp by the Nazis and the French Vichy Government. After the war, she collaborated with Serge Lifar, ballet master of the Paris Opera, on the sets and costumes for his ballets and began a collaboration with Pavel Muratov (Paul Murat), then president of the French League for the Protection of Birds. Birds were a recurring theme in her work, and she sculpted, drew, and painted them throughout her life. In 1953, she won the open competition to create the monument to the former French prime minister, Léon Blum, erected in his home town of Narbonne. She sculpted the head of the pianist Arthur Rubinstein when she was 83, and continued to paint canvases and portraits until her death.

== Collections ==
Lipska's works are held by, among others: the Musée des Années Trente in Paris, the Musée d'Art et d'Histoire in Meudon and the Musée Sainte-Croix in Poitiers, which both held an exhibition of her work in 2025–2026, the Musée de l'Opéra at the Paris Opera in Paris, the Musée National d'Art Moderne in the Centre Pompidou in Paris, which houses her head of Helena Rubenstein, the Musée Despiau-Wlérick in Mont-de-Marsan, and the Musée Blanche Hoschedé-Monet in Vernon. Collections are also held at the Polish Library in Paris, at the Królikarnia National Museum in Warsaw, and at the Metropolitan Museum of Art and the Cooper Hewitt, Smithsonian Design Museum in New York. Her textiles are exhibited at the Brooklyn Museum in New York, and her bust of Albert Einstein is at the Berner Kantonalbank in Bern, Switzerland.

== Death ==
Lipska died in Paris on 28 November 1973 at her home at 216 Boulevard Raspail, Paris. One of her last paintings depicted swallows and spiders against an orange storm background.
