= The Dream (Tamara de Lempicka) =

1927 painting by Tamara de Lempicka

- Artist: Tamara de Lempicka
- Year: 1927
- Medium: Oil on canvas
- Movement: Art Deco
- Dimensions: 81 cm × 60 cm (32 in × 24 in)
- Location: Private collection; Monaco

The Dream (French: Le rêve [lə ʁɛːv], or Le rêve (Rafaëla sur fond vert)) is an oil-on-canvas painting by the Polish Art Deco artist Tamara de Lempicka. The painting measures 81 by 60 centimetres (32 by 24 in) and was completed in 1927.

== Description ==
The painting shows a figure of a young, nude woman with shortly-cropped dark hair lying on a bed partly covered by a sheet and set against a green background. The woman has crossed arms which conceal breasts and is wearing a gold bracelet on her right hand. The model's head is cast to the side, as she gently rests her chin along her shoulder, "conveying the feeling of a lulling quiet or pause in activity".

== History and analysis ==
Painted in 1927 by Lempicka in Paris, the portrait can be described as a suggestive portrayal of a femme fatale in repose. The composition combines classical artistry with the bold aesthetics of the Art Deco movement and "exudes an air of sensuality and mystery, typical of Lempicka’s exploration of female empowerment and eroticism".

The artwork was first exhibited in 1929 at the Carnegie International Exhibition in the United States as The Dream though it has also been frequently referred to as Le rêve (Rafaëla sur fond vert) as such a title appears in Lempicka's own photo-archives. Rafaëla, who served as the model for the picture, was a young woman whom the painter met in the Bois de Boulogne, an area notoriously frequented by prostitutes. She would become one of Lempicka's most frequent models in her art of the late 1920s featuring in her 1927 masterpiece La Belle Rafaëla. According to Patrick Bade, her rendering of Rafaëla is "amongst the most potently erotic works of de Lempicka in which the desire of the artist for the soft and curvaceous body of the model is palpable".

Elizabeth Gorayed further notes that the sensuous and seductive depiction of the young woman was meant to enchant the viewer of the artist's composition. She goes on to observe the model's similarity of appearance to some of the most popular Hollywood film stars of the era stating that the artist wanted to encapsulate the beauty standards of the 1920s "fast and modern society".

== Art market ==
In 2011, the painting was sold for US$8.5 million at a Sotheby's auction in New York. It was a record-breaking price for a Lempicka painting at the time.

== See also ==
- Art Deco
- Women in art
- List of Polish painters
