= Phương Mai =

Duchess of Addis Abeba (1937–2021)

- Duchess of Addis Abeba; Marchioness of Sabotino
- Princess Phương Mai at 1955 Italian Grand Prix
- Born: 1 August 1937; Da Lat, French Indochina (now Vietnam)
- Died: 16 January 2021 (aged 83); Louveciennes, France
- Spouse: Pietro Badoglio, 2nd Duke of Addis Abeba
- Issue: Flavio Badoglio, 3rd Duke of Addis Abeba; Donna Manuela Badoglio
- House: Nguyễn Phúc
- Father: Emperor Bảo Đại
- Mother: Empress Nam Phương

Princess Phương Mai of Vietnam, Duchess of Addis Abeba (Note: The title imperial princess of Phương Mai means "daughter of emperor" which is "hoàng nữ" in Vietnamese, not "Công chúa", which is a title normally given to the daughters of Vietnamese emperors and also translated as princess in English) (1 August 1937 – 16 January 2021) was a daughter of Emperor Bảo Đại of Vietnam and his first wife, Empress Nam Phương. In 1947, Nam Phương left Vietnam with her children and lived at the Château Thorenc, outside of Cannes, France. Phương Mai received her education in France and returned to Vietnam from 1949 to 1953. She was educated at Convent des Oiseaux in Verneuil sur Seine, France.

On 5 August 1971, in Paris, France, Princess Phương Mai married Pietro Badoglio, 2nd Duke of Addis Abeba and Marquess of Sabotino, the son of the first duke Pietro Badoglio; they had two children, a son and a daughter:

- The Noble Signora Donna Manuela Badoglio (born at Dijon, France, on 26 June 1959).
- The Noble Signor Don Flavio Badoglio, 3rd Duke of Addis Abeba (born in Paris, France, on 20 March 1973). Educated at the American School of Paris.

She died on 16 January 2021 at Louveciennes, France, aged 83 years old.

== Ancestry ==
Ancestors of Phương Mai

8. Đồng Khánh
4. Khải Định
9. Hựu Thiên Thuần
2. Bảo Đại
10. Hoàng Văn Tích, Duke of Nghi
5. Hoàng Thị Cúc
1. Phương Mai
6. Pierre Nguyễn Hữu-Hào, Duke of Long Mỹ
3. Marie Thérèse Nguyễn Hữu Thị Lan
Philippe Le Phat Dat
7. Marie Lê Thị Binh
Agnes Huynh Thi Tai
