= Portrait of Marjorie Ferry =

1932 painting by Tamara de Lempicka

- Artist: Tamara de Lempicka
- Year: 1932
- Medium: Oil on canvas
- Movement: Art Deco
- Dimensions: 100 cm × 65 cm (39 in × 26 in)
- Location: Private collection

Portrait of Marjorie Ferry (French: Portrait de Marjorie Ferry) is an oil-on-canvas painting from 1932 by the Polish Art Deco painter Tamara de Lempicka.

== Description ==
The painting depitcts a young blonde-headed woman walking along a marble balcony. She is dressed in a white satin sheet and is wearing a shiny ring on her finger. She has perfectly smooth skin and well-manicured fingernails. She is surrounded by modernist shapes of architectural elements. The image of the woman, who is giving a seductive look at the viewer and gently smiling, casts an aura of mystery. The portrait presents a glittering scene of high society life in Paris during 1930.

== History ==
The painting depicts British cabaret singer Marjorie Ferry, who performed in Paris in the 1930s. It was commissioned by Ferry's husband in 1932 and painted in the artist's studio on rue Méchain. The artwork was intended as a gift to his newly-wed wife. A bright, large cabochon ring, which he gave her, was also depicted in the painting.

The painting has been described as the "Art Deco Mona Lisa" as Marjorie has nearly identical corners of the mouth and eyes as well as the shape of eyes and eyebrows with Leonardo da Vinci's Mona Lisa thus evoking the same enigmatic smile. Lempicka was known for combining modern elements with old ones in a classical style. Her paintings were created by strictly applying Renaissance and Cubist patterns.

== Art market ==
In February 2020, Portrait of Marjorie Ferry set a record for a work by Lempicka by fetching £16.3 million ($21.2 million) at the Impressionist and Modern Art Evening Sale at Christie's, London surpassing the previous record held by her 1927 painting La Tunique rose, which sold for $13.4 million in 2019. The painting became the single most expensive artwork by a Polish artist to date.

== See also ==
- Art Deco
- Women in art
- List of Polish painters
