= Pierre de Montaut =

French sailor (1892–1974)

Pierre Edmond Louis Marie de Montaut
- Born: 28 June 1892; Oloron-Sainte-Marie, France
- Died: 18 August 1974 (aged 82); Bayonne, France
- Spouse: Adrienne Górska (m. 1939, died 1969)
- Children: Jean-Pierre de Montaut, Françoise de Montaut
- Relatives: Tamara de Lempicka, artist (sister-in-law)

Pierre de Montaut (French: [pjɛʁ də mɔ̃to]; 28 June 1892 – 18 August 1974) was an architect and French sailor who competed in the 1936 Summer Olympics.

In the regatta held during the 1936 Summer Olympics, he competed in the Star class, placing 7th. Along with his second wife, Adrienne Górska, de Montaut designed numerous buildings.
