= Phương Liên =

Vietnamese princess (born 1939)

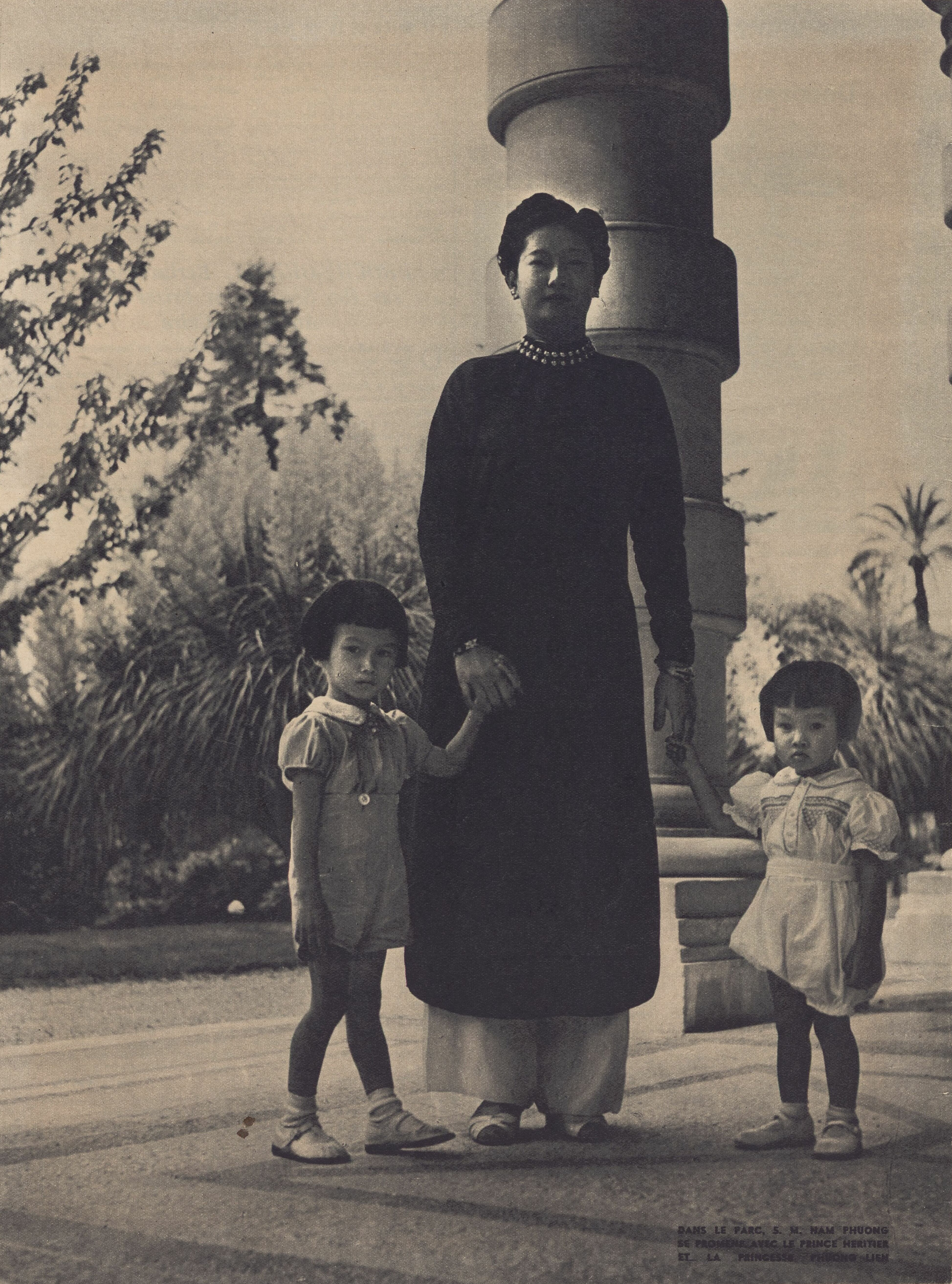
- Phương Liên (right) with her mother
- Born: 3 November 1939 (age 87); Đà Lạt
- Spouse: Bernard Soulain
- Issue: Valérie Soulain; Caroline Soulain
- House: Nguyễn Phúc
- Father: Bảo Đại
- Mother: Nam Phương

Princess Phương Liên of Vietnam (born 3 November 1939 in Đà Lạt) is a daughter of Bảo Đại, the last emperor of Vietnam, and his first wife, Empress Nam Phương.

== Biography ==
Her father abdicated as emperor in 1945.

She was educated at the Convent des Oiseaux, Verneuil-sur-Seine, France, and in England.

On 6 January 1961, in the Catholic rite of matrimony, Princess Phương Liên married banker Bernard Maurice Soulain, in Chabrignac, Corrèze, France. He is from Bordeaux, and is the son of Alysse Albert Soulain and his wife, Yvonne Adrienne Marguerite Cousin.

They have two daughters:

- Valérie Soulain (born on 20 July 1963)
- Caroline Soulain (born on 20 March 1966)
