= Adam and Eve (Tamara de Lempicka) =

1932 painting by Tamara de Lempicka

- Artist: Tamara de Lempicka
- Year: 1932
- Medium: Oil on panel
- Dimensions: 116 cm × 73 cm (46 in × 29 in)
- Location: Private collection

Adam and Eve is an oil-on-panel painting by the Polish painter Tamara de Lempicka, from 1932. It is in the Art Deco style and depicts a male nude embracing a female nude holding an apple. In the background are stylized skyscapers. The painting is 116 by 73 centimetres (46 by 29 in) and is housed in a private collection.

== Description ==
Lempicka was fond of repeating stories about the creation of Adam and Eve. The inspiration for this painting arose when a professional female model took a break to eat an apple. Lempicka asked her to hold the pose and started to sketch. She then invited a policeman who was making his rounds in the streets to pose for Adam. Lempicka contrasts the natural beauty of human bodies with a barren, industrious cityscape.

== Provenance ==
The painting previously belonged to Barbra Streisand, who acquired it around 1986 for $135,000. On March 3, 1994, Christie's held a dedicated sale of Streisand's collection, including Adam and Eve, which sold for $1,982,500, at the time, setting a record price for the artist at auction. Streisand told The New York Times, "We screamed when the Lempicka price went over $1 million ... I was working out with my exercise teacher and when the bidding went over the top I screamed."

The work is currently in a private collection.

== In the media ==
In December 1993, Architectural Digest featured Streisand's Art-Deco-inspired Malibu home; the front cover of the issue included an image of Streisand and Adam and Eve.

In 1996, the movie First Wives Club included Adam and Eve. In the film, the painting belongs to Elise Eliot-Atchison, played by Goldie Hawn.
