= Émile Molinié =

French architect

Émile Joseph Molinié (1 June 1877 in La Rochelle – c. 1964) was a 20th-century French architect.

The son of Henri Deglane, occasional collaborator of Charles Nicod, rather active in Cannes, he was made a Chevalier of the Légion d'honneur in 1926.

== Creations ==
- 1913: ateliers for artists, 7 rue Lebouis, 14th arrondissement of Paris, nowadays headquarters of the Fondation Cartier pour l'Art Contemporain. In 1913, the façade was awarded at the concours de façades de la ville de Paris.
- 1914: building at 43 rue Émile-Ménier, 16th, this building was the subject of a publication: Monographies de Bâtiments Modernes. Maison rue Émile Menier N° 43 à Paris, Mr. E. Molinié, Architecte, Paris, Ducher Fils, 1914.
- 1923–1925: lotissement concerté de l'Avenue-du-Parc-Saint-James, avenue du Parc-Saint-James and rue du Bois-de-Boulogne in Neuilly-sur-Seine in collaboration with Charles Nicod and Albert Pouthier
- 1926: spa, Cambo-les-Bains, with Charles Nicod and Henri Sajous.
- 1929: Villa Domergue, Cannes, with Charles Nicod.
- 1935: former Picard printing, 10 rue Falguière, 14th, with Charles Nicod.
- 1954: building at 9-13 avenue Myron-Herrick, 18th.
- 1954: building at 1-3 rue du Colonel-Driant; 29 rue Jean-Jacques Rousseau, 1st.
