= Château Thorenc =

French castle

Coordinates: 43.564°N 7.0289°E

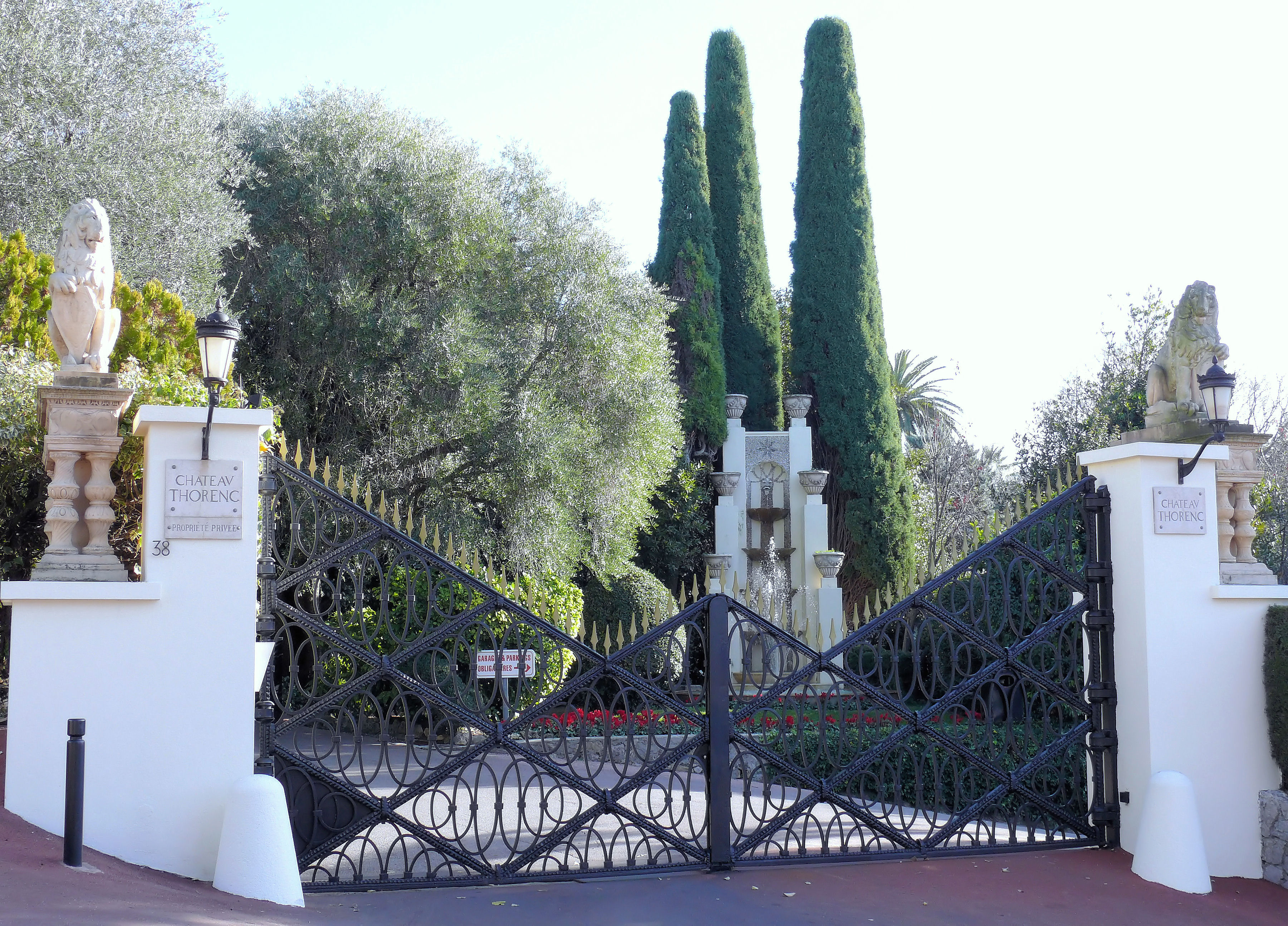
Entrance to Chateau Thorenc

The Château Thorenc is a historic garden in Cannes, France. It was established in 1870 for the Duchess of Bedford, when a chateau was erected. It was acquired by Sir Richard Atwood Glass in 1876. It was subsequently purchased by the Duchess of Montrose, followed by Stuart Rendel, 1st Baron Rendel. It was purchased by Albert Neubauer in 1930. He hired architects Louis Süe and Léon Le Bel to re-design the chateau, while painter Jean-Gabriel Domergue designed the Venetian living-room. It was owned by Bảo Đại, the emperor of Annam, from 1937 to 1960. In 1968, the chateau was demolished and replaced with a residential building. Over the years, the garden designers were Mr Maria, followed by Lucien Lhotte, Denis Troncy and Jean-Baptiste Dental.
