= Autoportrait (Tamara in a Green Bugatti) =

1929 painting by Tamara de Lempicka

Autoportrait (Self-Portrait in a Green Bugatti)
- Artist: Tamara de Lempicka
- Year: 1929
- Medium: Oil on panel
- Movement: Art Deco
- Dimensions: 35 cm × 27 cm (13 (3/4) in × 10 (5/8) in)
- Location: Private Collection, Switzerland

Autoportrait (Tamara in a Green Bugatti) is a self-portrait by the Polish artist Tamara de Lempicka, which she painted in Paris in 1929. It was commissioned by the German fashion magazine Die Dame for the cover of the magazine, to celebrate the independence of women. It is one of the best-known examples of Art Deco portrait painting.

== Description ==
In 1928, De Lempicka was commissioned to make a self-portrait for the cover of the German fashion magazine Die Dame. The painting she produced showed her at the wheel of a Bugatti racing car, wearing a leather helmet and gloves and wrapped in a gray scarf. She portrayed herself as a personification of cold beauty, independence, wealth and inaccessibility. In fact she did not own a Bugatti automobile; her own car was a small yellow Renault, which was stolen one night when she and her friends were celebrating at Café de la Rotonde in Montparnasse.

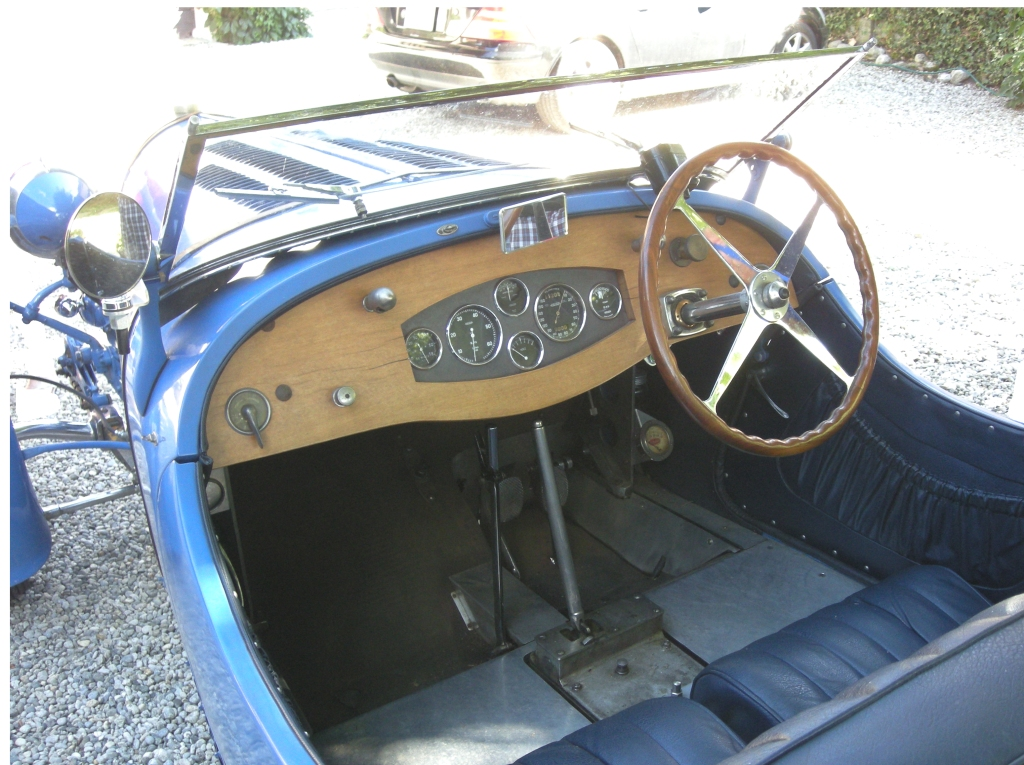
Cockpit of a Bugatti type 43. The steering wheel was actually on the right, not the left as shown in the painting.

Although De Lempicka's portrait shows the steering wheel on the left side of the car, the Bugatti models 23, 43 and 46 of that period actually had the steering wheel on the right side.

== Influences ==
De Lempicka developed her painting skills among the avant-garde art and literature movements of Neo-Cubism, Futurism, and Art Deco of the "Lost Generation". She studied at the Académie Ranson under Maurice Denis, although she only credited him for her draftsmanship skills. One of her main influences was the Neo-cubist André Lhote (professor to De Lempicka at the Académie de la Grande Chaumière)

A possible influence for this particular picture might have been by André Kertész, who was living in Paris in the 1920s and whose 1927 photo has a very similar composition.

== Patron ==
The female editor of Die Dame, a popular German fashion magazine, encountered De Lempicka in Monte Carlo while the almost-divorced baroness was on vacation and commissioned her to paint a self-portrait for an upcoming cover. De Lempicka replaced her yellow Renault with a green Bugatti because she believed that a green Bugatti appeared more elite and more beautiful.
