= Nam Phương =

Empress of Vietnam

Nam Phương Hoàng hậu 南芳皇后
- Empress of Vietnam
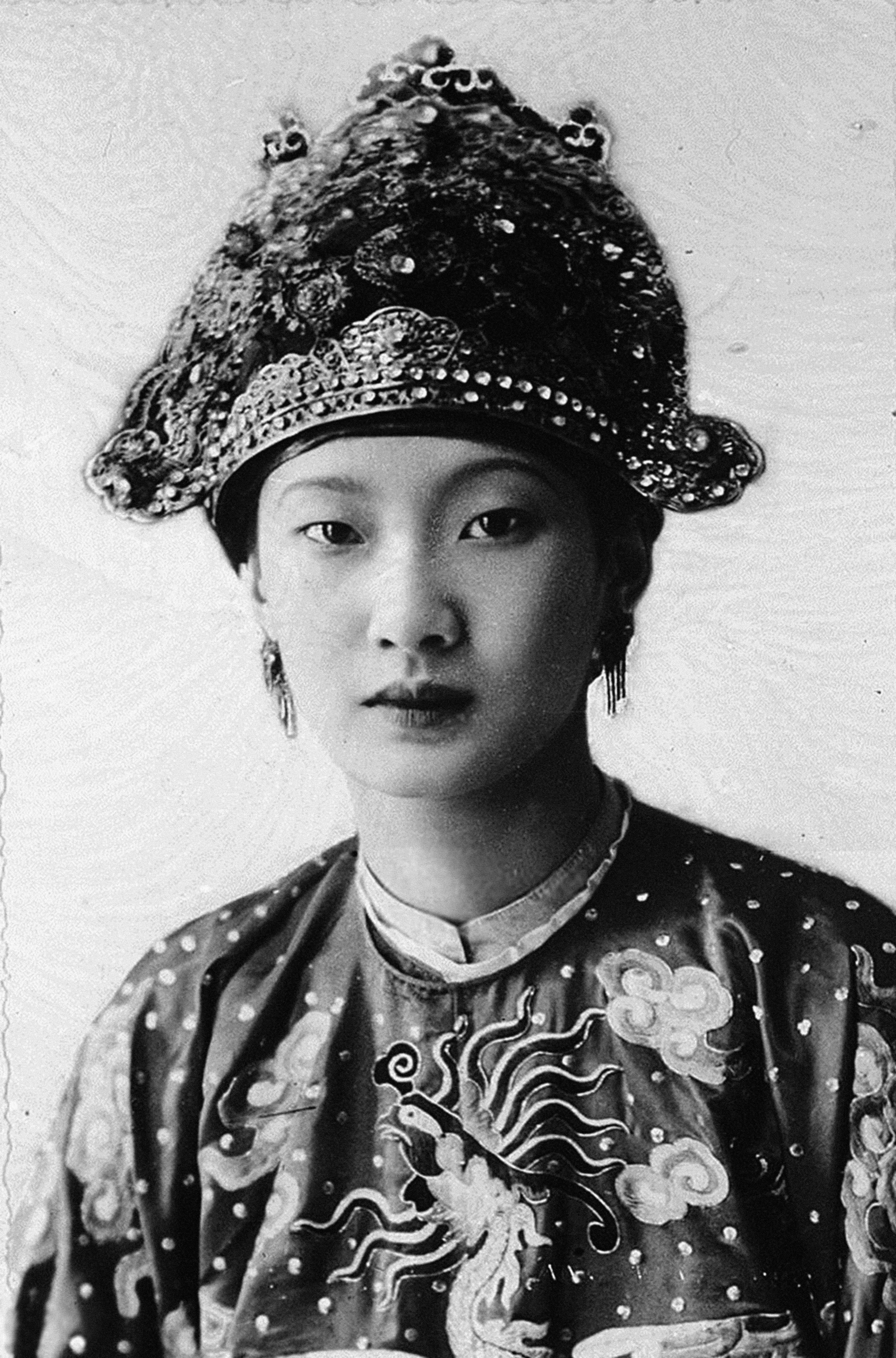
- Nam Phương on her wedding day, 1934

Empress Consort of Vietnam
- Tenure: 20 March 1934 – 25 August 1945
- Predecessor: Hoàng Thị Cúc
- Successor: Monarchy abolished
- Born: Jeanne Mariette Nguyễn Hữu Hào; 14 November 1913; Saigon, Cochinchina
- Died: 16 September 1963 (aged 49); Chabrignac, Corrèze, France
- Burial: Chabrignac, Corrèze
- Spouse: Bảo Đại
- Issue: Crown Prince Bảo Long; Princess Phương Mai; Princess Phương Liên; Princess Phương Dung; Prince Bảo Thăng
Names
- Jeanne Mariette Nguyễn Thị Lan (baptismal)
- House: Nguyễn Phúc (by marriage)
- Father: Nguyễn Hữu Hào
- Mother: Lê Thị Binh
- Religion: Catholicism
- Seal

Empress Nam Phương (14 November 1913 – 16 September 1963), born Jeanne Mariette Nguyễn Hữu Hào, was the last empress consort of Vietnam. She was the wife of Bảo Đại (r. 1926–1945), the last emperor of Vietnam (officially named as Đại Nam before March 1945), from 1934 until her death. She was also the second and last empress consort (hoàng hậu) of the Nguyễn dynasty.

== Background ==
Jeanne Mariette Nguyễn Thị Lan was born at No. 1 Rousseau Street in Saigon in 1913. Her father was Pierre Nguyễn Hữu Hào, and her mother was Marie Lê Thị Bình. Pierre Hào was born in Tân Hòa village, Chợ Lớn province, into a poor Catholic family originating from the Gò Công–Trao Trảo area of Biên Hòa province (now part of Long Bình Ward, Ho Chi Minh City). However, many sources mistakenly identify this as the Gò Công region in present-day Tiền Giang (now Đồng Tháp). Her name recorded in the baptismal register was Jeanne Mariette Nguyễn Thị Lan.

Her birth date, according to both the book Souverains et notabilites d'Indochine compiled by the Government-General of French Indochina and the book Nguyễn Phúc tộc thế phả compiled by the Board of Trustees of the House of Nguyễn Phúc (Hội đồng Trị sự Nguyễn Phúc tộc), is 4 November 1914. On her tomb in France and in the records of Saigon City Governor's Office, her date of birth is written as 14 November 1913. According to researcher François Joyaux, her actual date of birth was 14 November 1913 (corresponding to the 17th day of the 10th lunar month of the Year of Quý Sửu), but it was altered in official documents because it was considered "unfavorable by the court astrologers", making the empress one year younger.

Her father, Pierre Nguyễn Hữu Hào, described as a wealthy merchant, had been born into a poor ethnic Vietnamese Catholic family in Kiến Hòa district, Định Tường province. Through an introduction from the Bishop of Saigon, he became secretary to the billionaire Lê Phát Đạt, Duke of Long-My, and eventually married his employer's daughter, Marie Lê Thị Bình, and inherited his title.

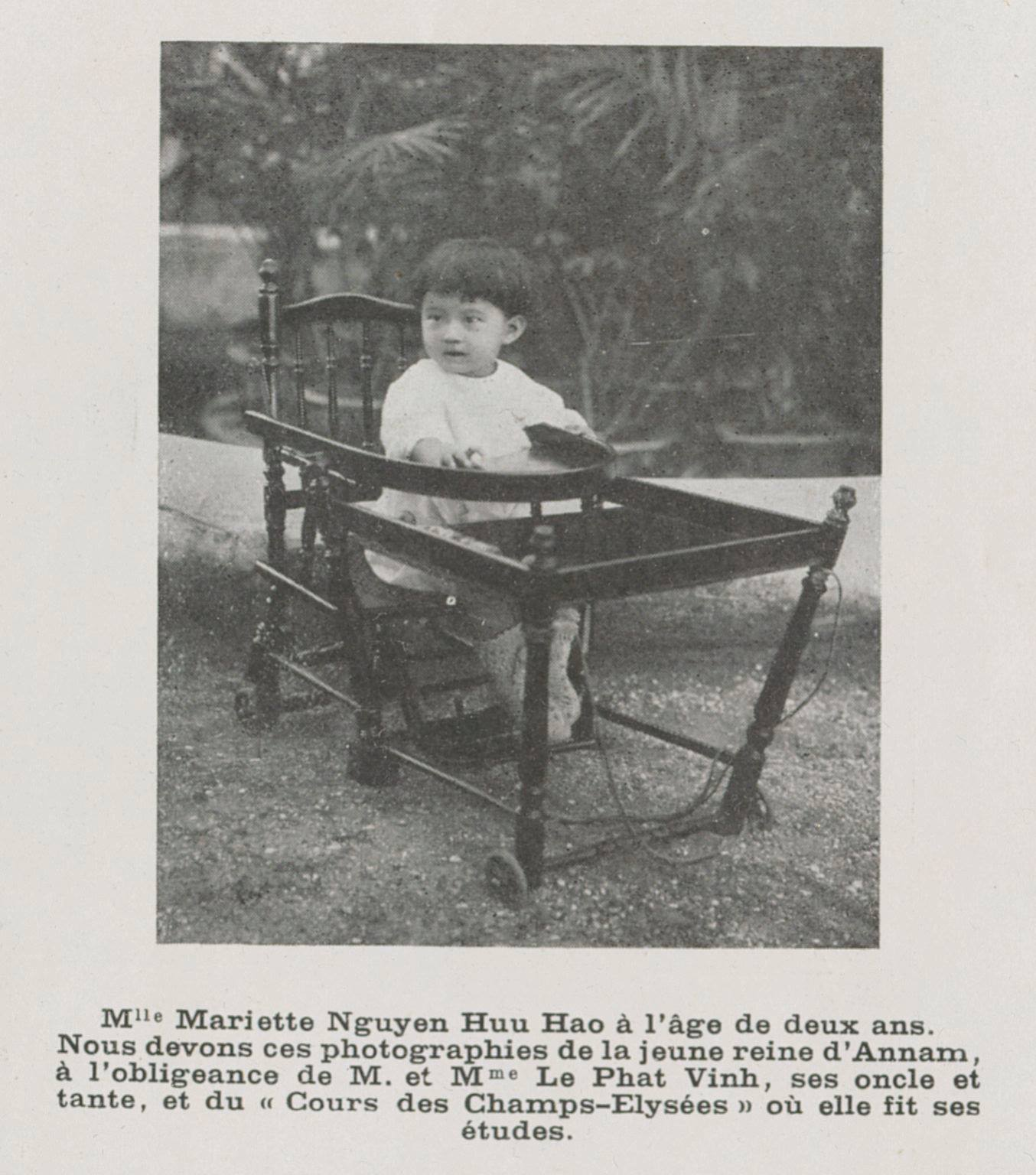
Jeanne Marie-Thérèse Nguyễn-hữu-thị-Lan at age 2.

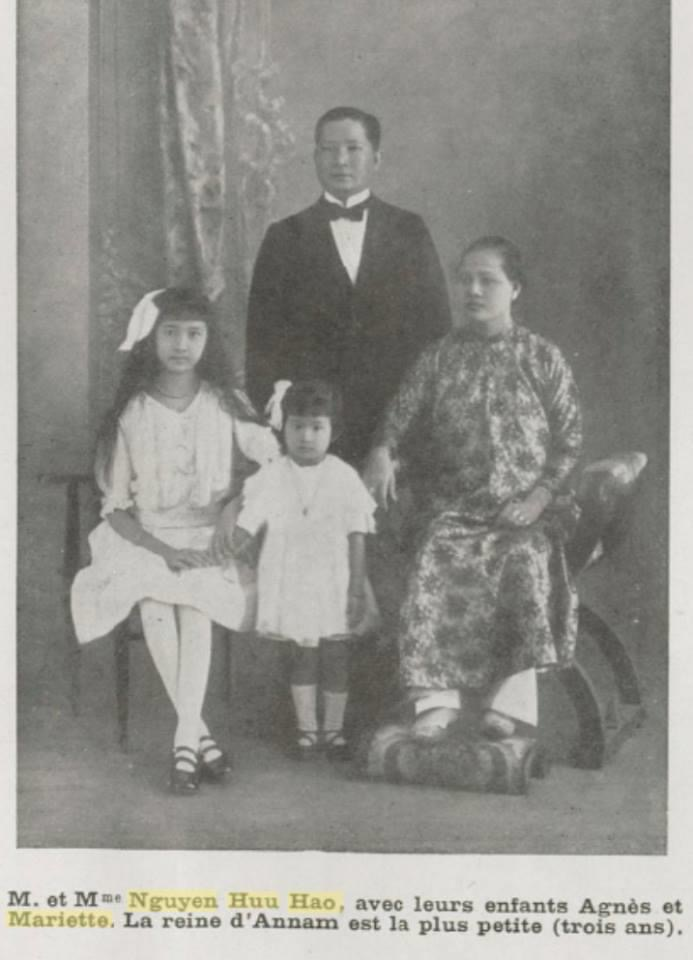
Family of Nguyễn Hữu Hào, Nam Phuong (middle) at 3 years old.

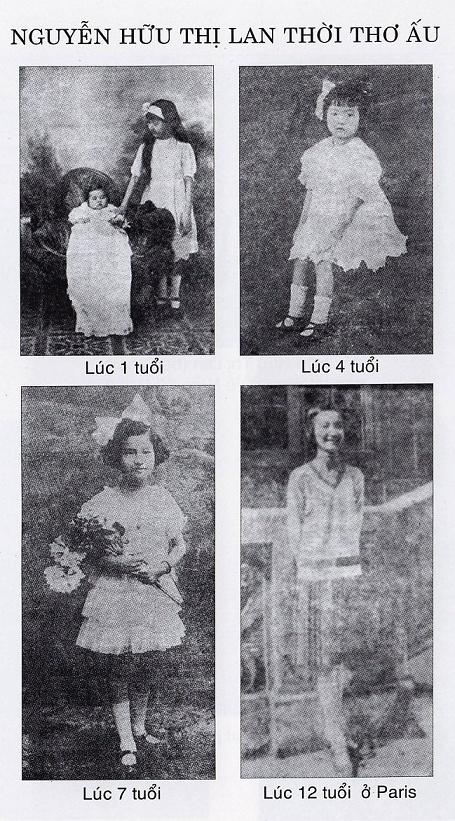
Maturity of young Nam Phương from 1 to 12 years old.

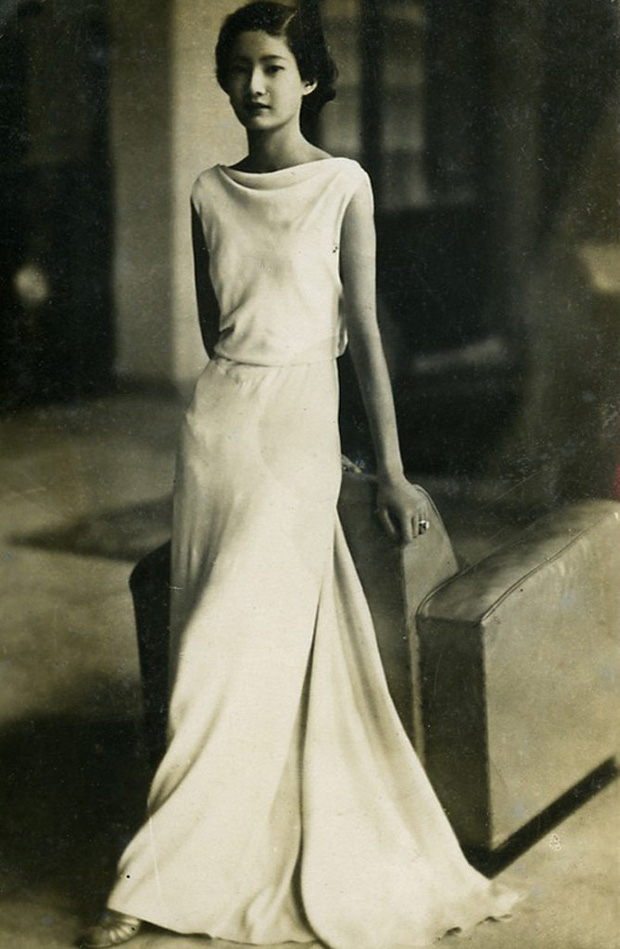
Young Nam Phương

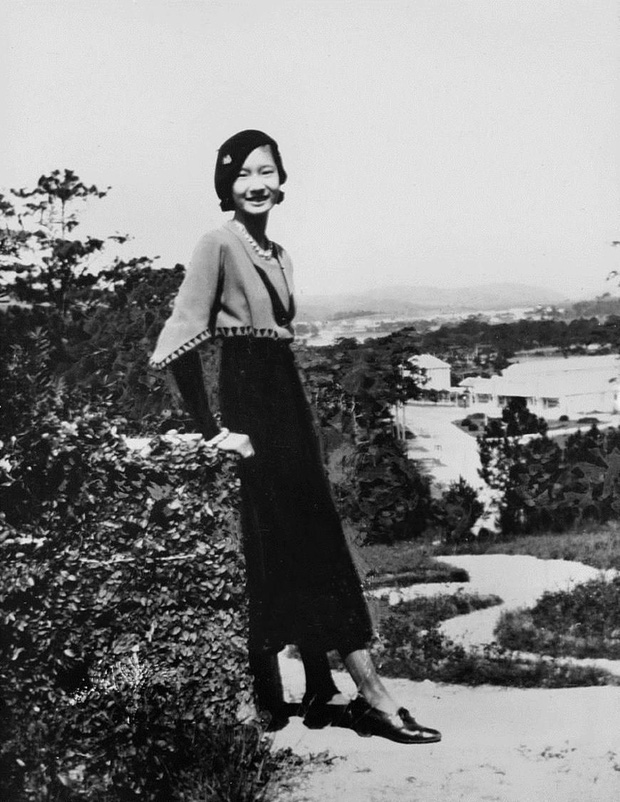
Young empress Nam Phương in Da Lat

A naturalized French citizen, Nguyễn Hữu Thị Lan, who was known as Mariette, studied at the Couvent des Oiseaux, an aristocratic Catholic school located in Neuilly-sur-Seine, France, where she was sent at the age of 12.

She was a distant cousin of her future husband, the emperor.

== Marriage ==
On 9 March 1934, the public announcement of the engagement of Nguyễn Hữu Thị Lan and Bảo Đại, Emperor of Đại Nam, was released. In it, Bảo Đại stated, "The future Queen, reared like us in France, combines in her person the graces of the West and the charms of the East. We who have had the occasion to meet her believe that she is worthy to be our companion and our equal. We are certain by her conduct and example that she fully merits the title of First Woman of the Empire." After a formal betrothal ceremony in the imperial summer palace in Da Lat, the emperor married Nguyễn Hữu Thị Lan on 20 March 1934, in Huế. The ceremony was Buddhist, though the ruler's Catholic fiancée caused some controversy; the country's population was not entirely in favor of the bride's religious affiliation. Others suspected that the marriage "smelled high of French chicanery." The New York Times reported that "discontent was general" in the country, given that Nguyễn Hữu Thị Lan had declined to renounce Catholicism and was appealing to Pope Pius XI for a dispensation. Another article noted that there was much discussion over a report that the pope might allow the bride to "remain a Catholic if she gave the Church her girl children." Further complicating the wedding plans was the apparent disapproval of the young monarch's mother, Doan Huy, and his late father's secondary wives, all of whom had other bridal candidates that Bảo Đại apparently did not consider.

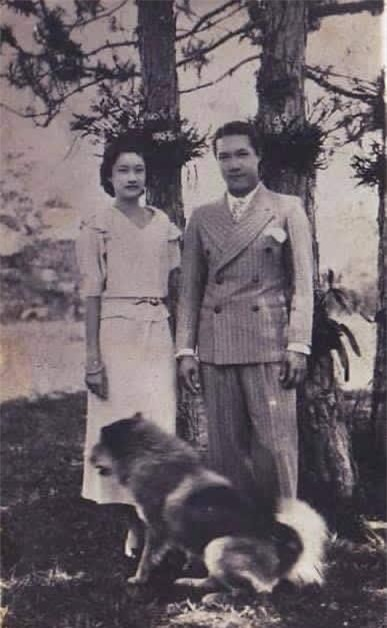
Nam Phương and Bảo Đại in dating period at Đà Lạt, 1933.

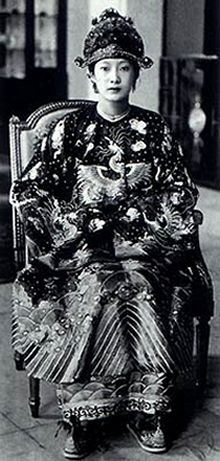
Empress Nam Phương on wedding day

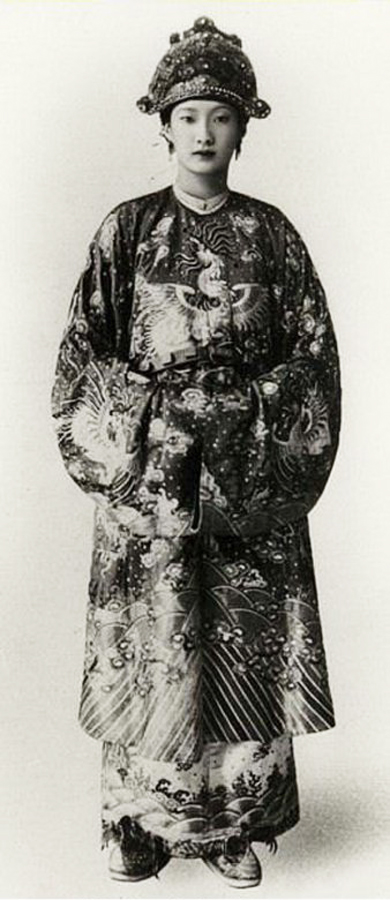
Empress consort in phoenix robe on her wedding day

At the state ceremony that marked the end of the four-day wedding festivities, Nguyễn Hữu Thị Lan was given the title 'Empress Consort' and the name Nam Phương, which can be roughly translated as 'Fragrance of the South', in acknowledgment of her place of birth.

Time on 2 April 1934 closely followed the traditional royal nuptials:

"Little Mariette Nguyen Huu Hao was beautifully married. It took four days. On her way up Annam's great mandarin road along the coast she stopped off to climb a mountain and drink of the "frozen spring." Outside Huê, a cavalcade of palace mandarins on short native Phu-Yen horses met her in the Valley of Clouds and escorted her through the three walls of the Red City into the Palace of Passengers. Next day, dressed in a great brocaded Annamite gown, she stepped into an automobile and was driven to the Emperor's Palace, followed by the Imperial princesses and the blue-turbaned wives of the mandarins. Two scrolls, on which were written a prayer to Bảo Đại's ancestors and the name and age (18) of Nguyen Huu Hao, were burnt on the altars. Finally the two young people were brought face to face and married. It took three more days of Buddhist rites behind the locked gates of the Red City to complete the ceremony. On the fourth day a battalion of mandarins led in musicians and the bearers of the royal insignia. The new Queen, her hair elaborately wound about a tiara encrusted with precious stones, received the Imperial seal and the golden book. Finally she arose and bowed her forehead to the floor three times, in the traditional Chinese kowtow (pronounced ker-toe) of thanks."

At the time of her marriage, a song was written in her honor: "In the firmament of the Son of Heaven a brilliant new star has risen!/Supple as the neck of the swan is the charm of her graceful form./Her black and sparkling eyes, in hours of ease, envelop and thrill that happy mortal allowed to see./O, Nguyễn Hữu-Hào! Beautiful are all thy ways."

=== Empress ===
She was titled as the Empress Consort soon after her marriage to Emperor Bảo Đại in 1934. Bảo Đại bestowed upon her the title of Nam Phương Hoàng hậu which went against the convention established by Gia Long. From Gia Long until Khải Định all empresses consort were known as Hoàng phi and would only be known as a Hoàng hậu after their deaths.

On 18 June 1945, Nam Phương was raised in rank from Her Majesty to Her Imperial Majesty. Bảo Đại continued to assume the title of emperor after proclaiming the country's independence from France on March 11, 1945, as he was urged to rule his empire as a member of Japan's Greater East Asia Co-Prosperity Sphere. At this time, Tonkin, Annam, and Cochinchina, which came under the control of Imperial Japan after the coup d'état in French Indochina, were reunited to become the Empire of Vietnam. However, the emperor was later convinced to abdicate the throne by the revolutionary movement Viet Minh, at that time not widely known as being led by communists. He accepted Ho Chi Minh's invitation to become a supreme advisor to the Provisional Government of the Democratic Republic of Viet Nam later in 1945.

== Children ==
The emperor and empress had five children, most of whom were educated at the French boarding school their mother had attended, Convent des Oiseaux.

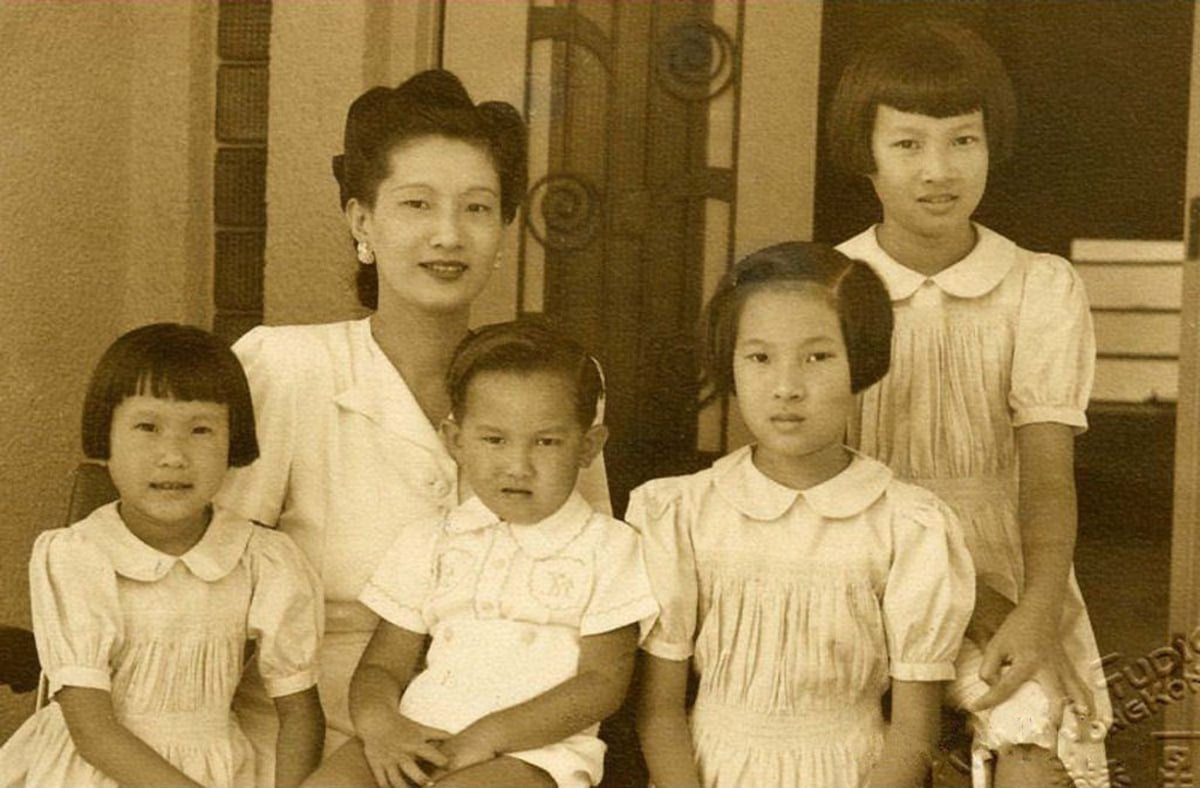
From left to right, princess Phương Mai, Empress consort Nam Phương, Bảo Thăng, Phương Liên, Phương Dung in Hong Kong, 1947

- Crown Prince Bảo Long (4 January 1936 – 28 July 2007).
- Princess Phương Mai (1 August 1937 – 16 January 2021; married Don Pietro Badoglio, 2nd Duke of Addis Abeba and Marquis of Sabotino).
- Princess Phương Liên born on 2 November 1938 (married Bernard Maurice Soulain).
- Princess Phương Dung born on 5 February 1942.
- Prince Bảo Thăng (30 September 1944 – 15 March 2017).

== Influence on fashion ==
Nam Phương's first official visit to Europe, in the summer of 1939, launched a craze for what one reporter described as "trousers and embroidered tunics for evenings; pagoda silhouettes, [and] revers or sleeve forms." To the surprise of fashion observers, when she met with Pope Pius XII during that trip, "the visitor from Indochina did not wear the traditional black (In Vietnam black is associated with mourning and funerals), long-sleeved gown and veil. Instead, she appeared in a gold, dragon-embroidered tunic, red scarf, and gold hat. She wore silver trousers."

== Later life ==
Nam Phương served as a member of the Reconstruction Committee for Vietnam after the end of World War II and was the patron of the Vietnamese Red Cross. She raised funds and called for the recognition of the independence of Vietnam. In Hue, Nam Phuong presided over the "Golden Week" launched by the Viet Minh to encourage people to donate to the state budget. That day, September 17, 1945, she was the first to approach a table covered with a red cloth and slowly remove all the gold jewelry she was wearing. After Bảo Đại left Huế for Hanoi in September 1945, he had other mistresses. The next year, the former emperor was asked by the communists to stay in China. He returned to Vietnam in 1949 at the invitation of the nationalist government and was named Chief of the State of Vietnam, but he was overthrown again in 1955, by his Prime Minister.

In 1947, after the outbreak of full-scale war between the Viet Minh and France, the empress and her children moved to Đà Lạt to live and later went to Hong Kong to reunite with Bảo Đại on September 3. She de facto separated from her husband in 1955. Two years later, when the South Vietnamese government announced its confiscation of the imperial family's personal property, the bill specifically excluded any real estate owned by the empress prior to 1949. These properties included her father's villa at Da Lat, which is now Lam Dong Museum.

== Death ==
Empress Nam Phương died on 16 September 1963 from a heart attack, at Domaine de La Perche, her home near the small rural village of Chabrignac, Corrèze, France. She was buried in the local cemetery.

== Pictures ==
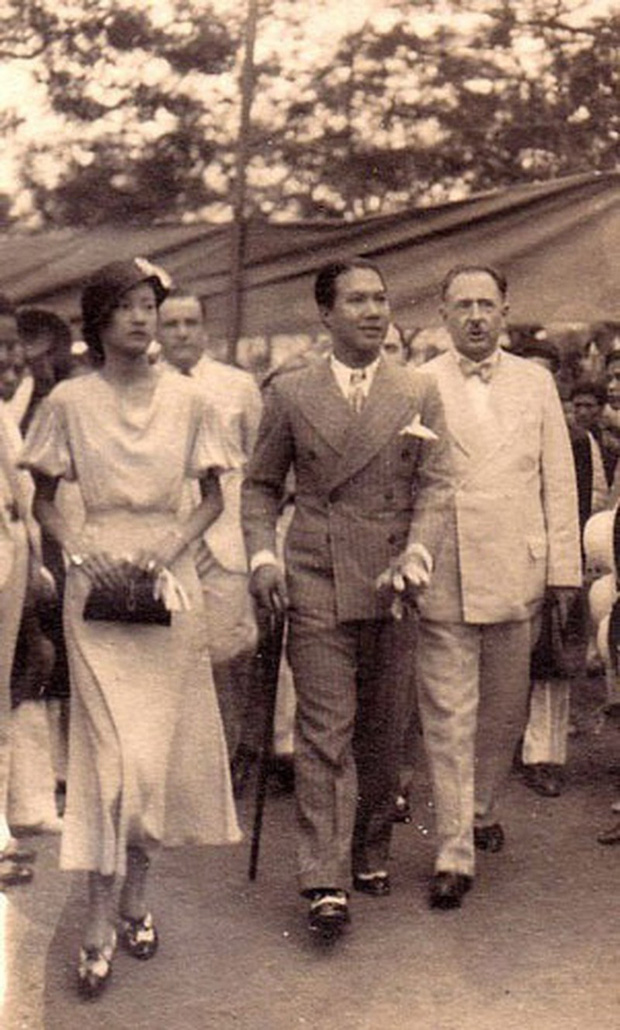
Bảo Đại & Nam Phương

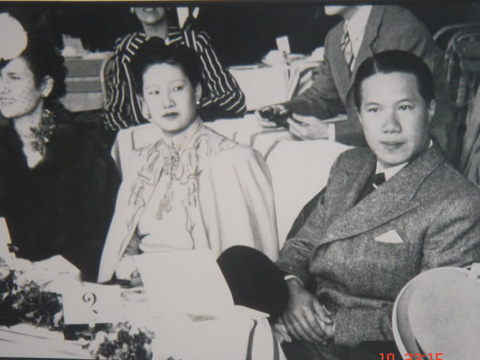
Bảo Đại & Nam Phương at the party

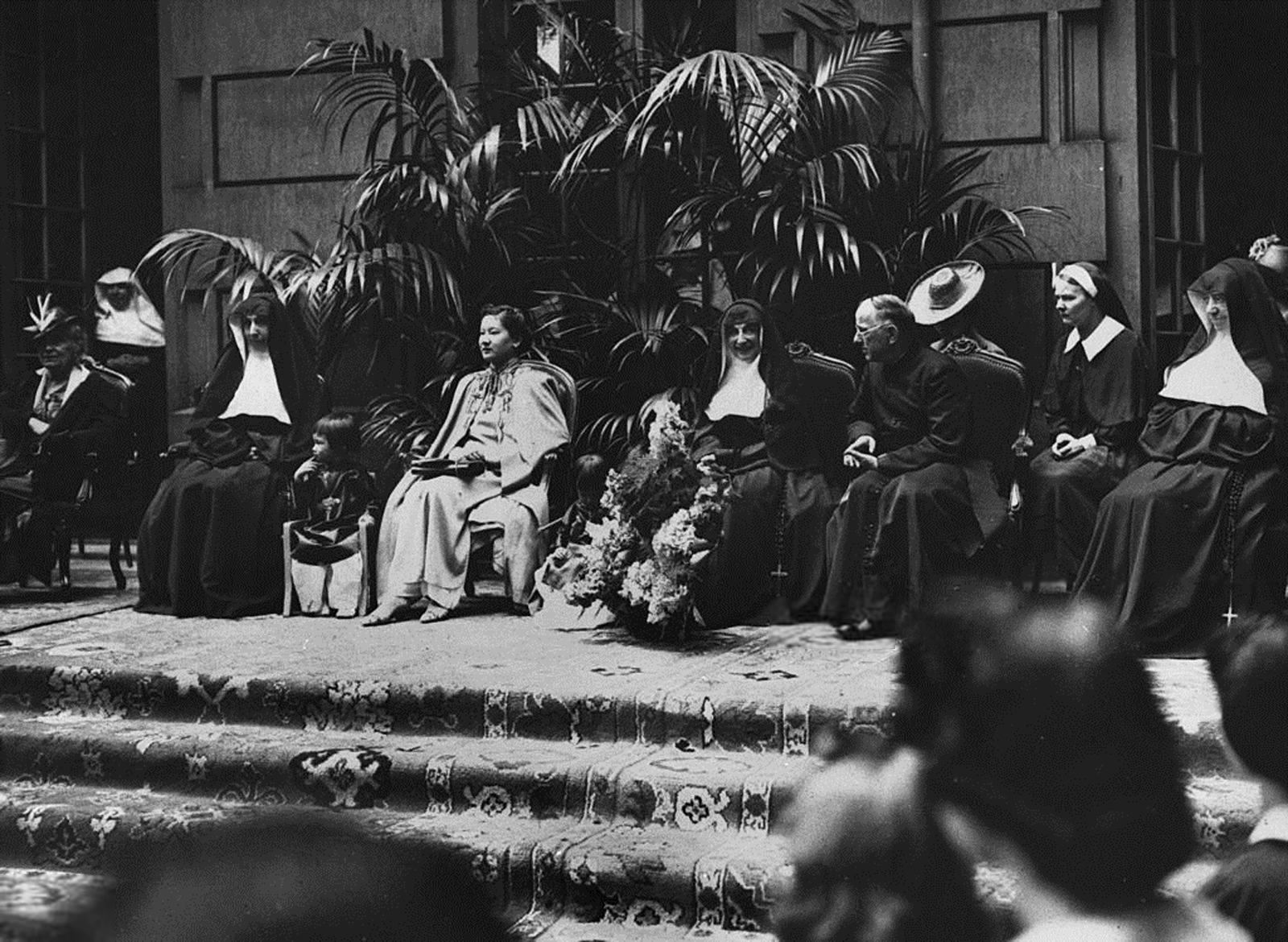
Empress consort Nam Phương and crown prince Bảo Long visit her high school Couvent des Oiseaux in Paris.

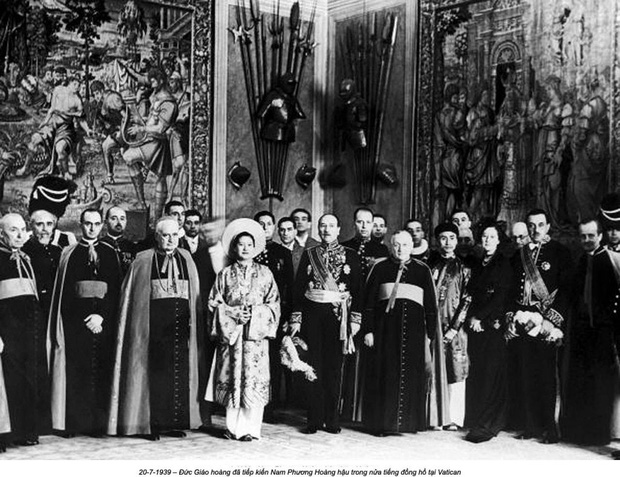
Nam Phương in the Vatican.

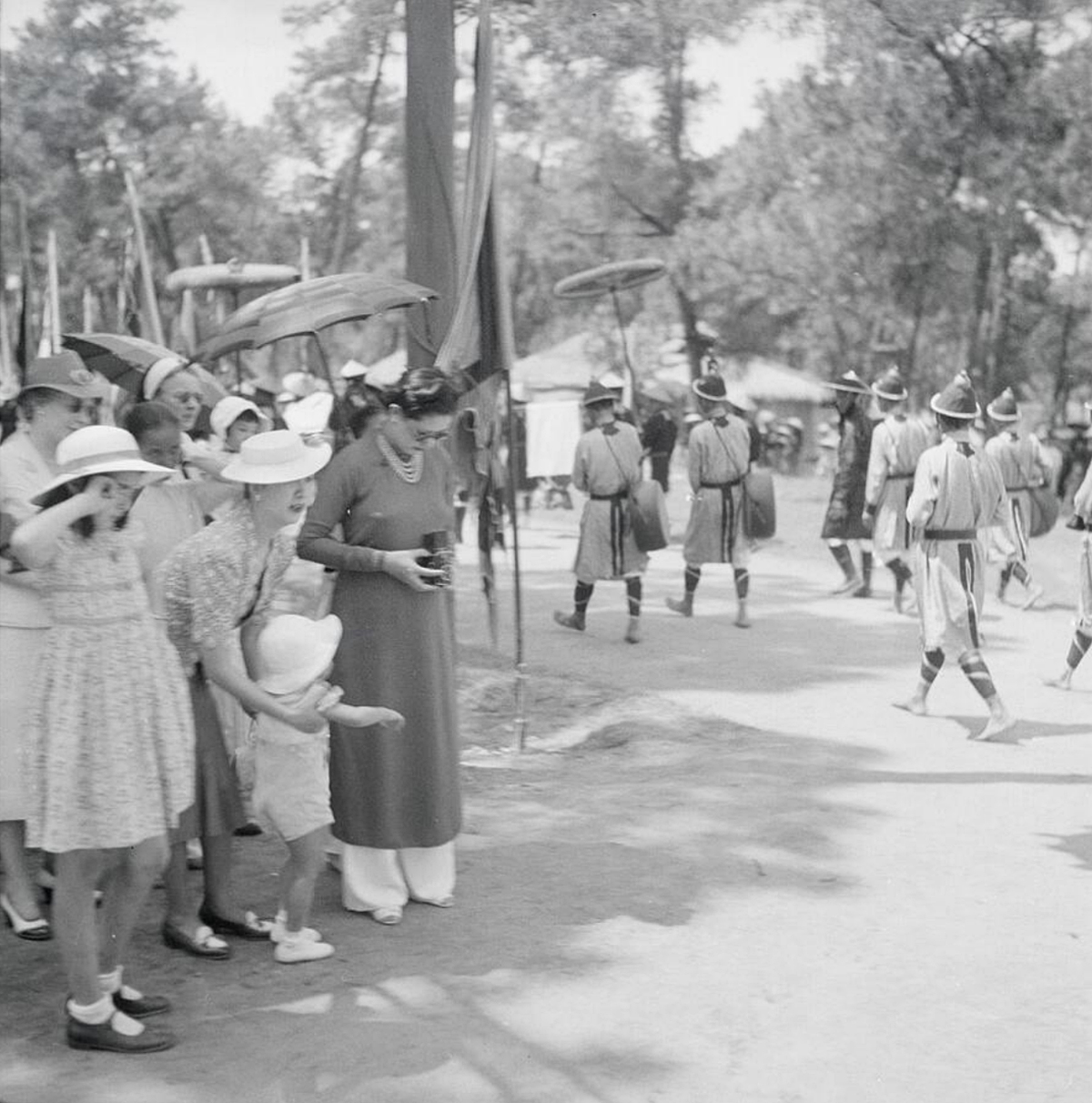
The Empress (holding camera) at the Nam Giao Ceremony 1942

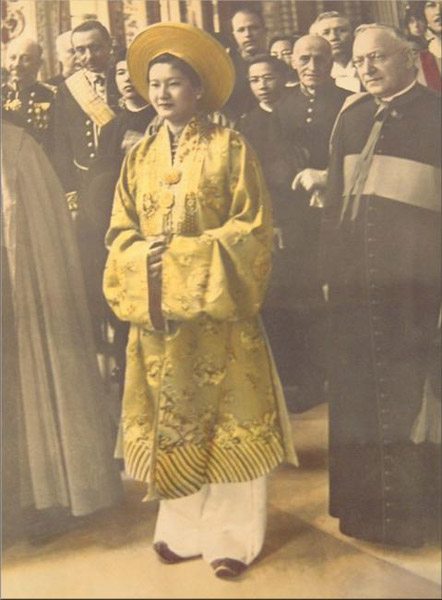
Nam Phuong visits Vatican City.

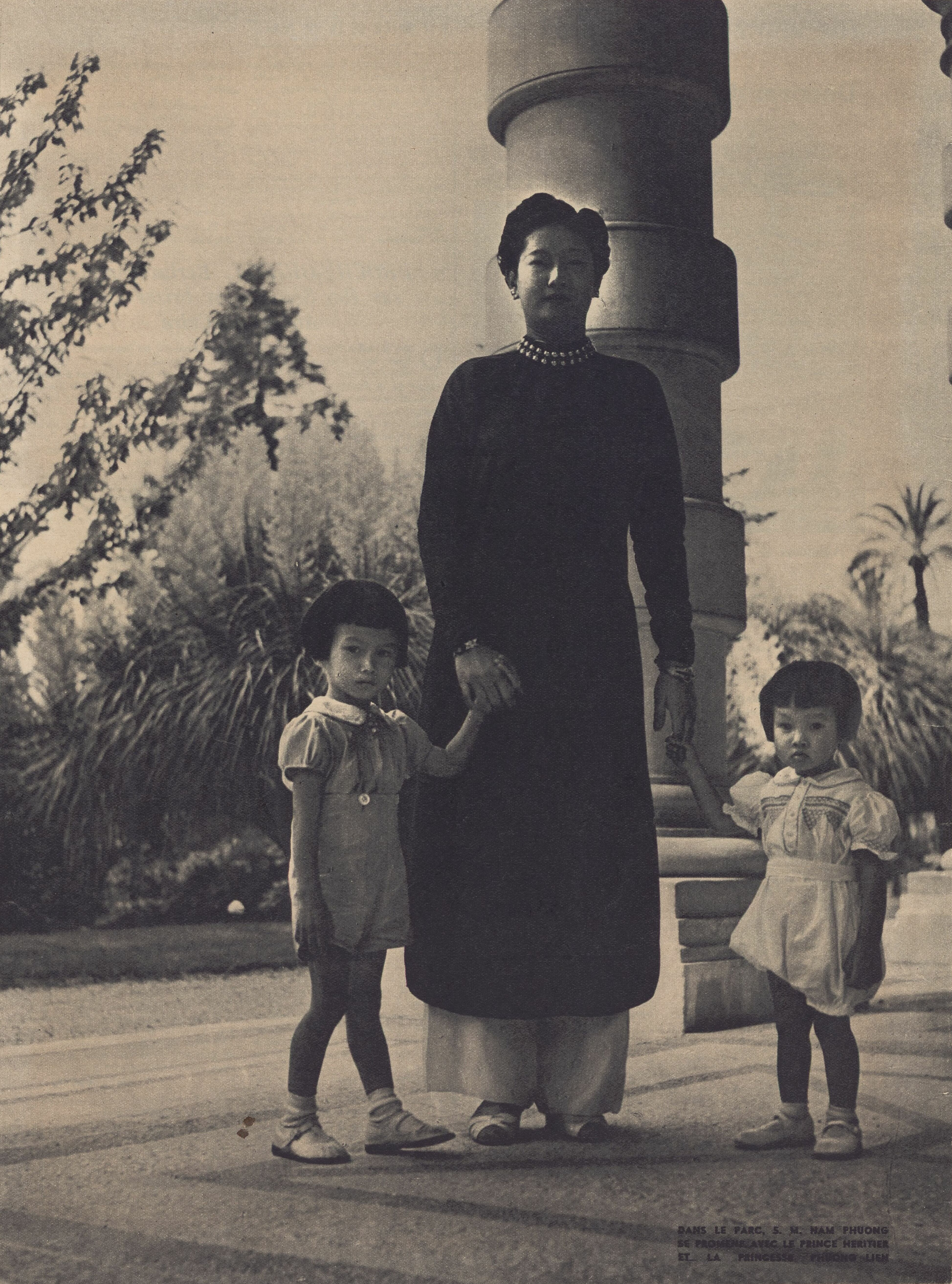
Nam Phuong with Crown Prince Bảo Long (left) and princess Phương Liên (right) in 1938

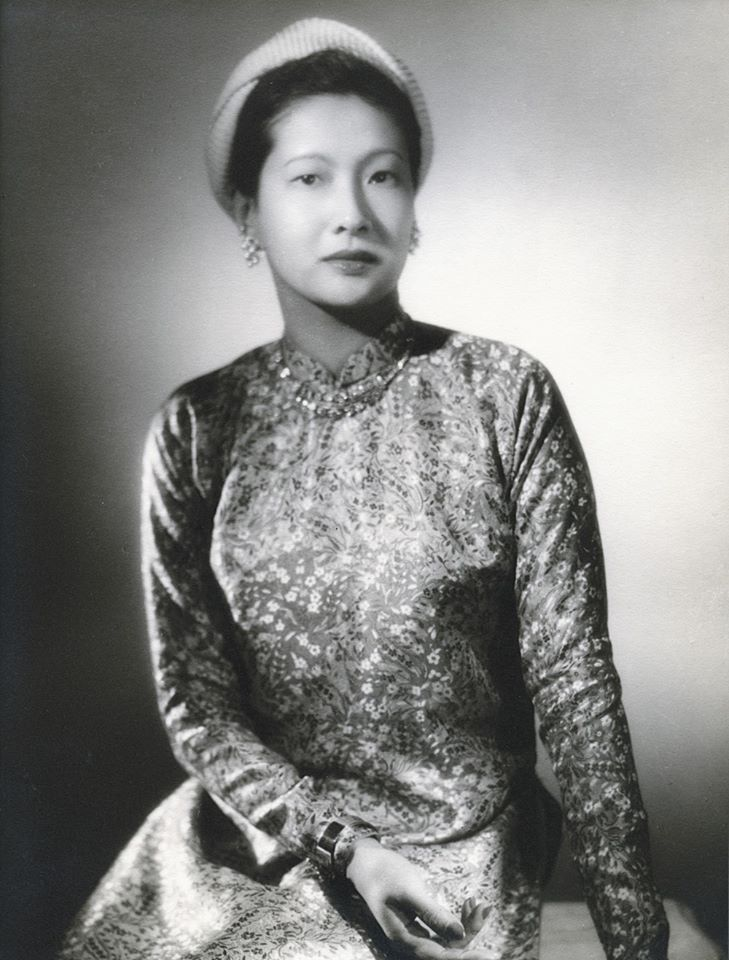
Nam Phuong in traditional Ao Dai

== Media ==
Nam Phương was portrayed by the actress Yến Chi in the 2004 Vietnamese miniseries Ngọn nến Hoàng cung ("The Imperial Palace's Candlelight"). The empress was also portrayed by the singer Hòa Minzy in her 2020 music video for Không thể cùng nhau suốt kiếp.

Preceded by Empress Thừa Thiên	Empress of Nguyễn Dynasty	Succeeded by none
