= Alexander Clavel =

Swiss silk dyer and chemical-industry pioneer, founder of Ciba

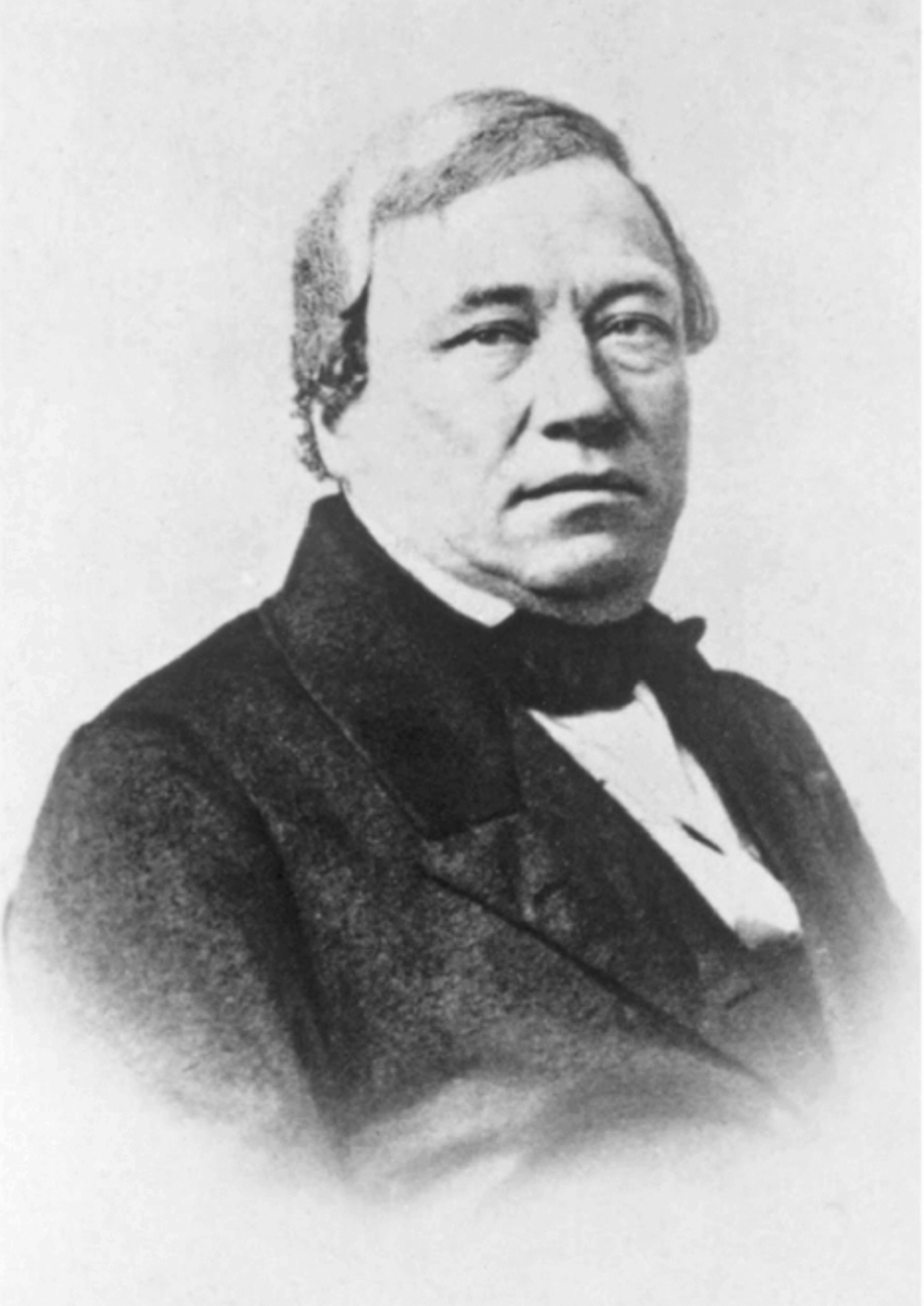
- Alexander Clavel, c. 1860 (Novartis Company Archive)
- Born: 17 December 1805; Lyon, France
- Died: 22 February 1873 (aged 67); Basel, Switzerland
- Occupations: Industrialist, silk dyer, chemical entrepreneur
- Known for: Founder of the dye works that became Ciba (later Ciba-Geigy and Novartis)
- Spouse: Henriette Linder
- Children: Alexander Clavel-Merian (1847–1910)

Alexander Clavel (17 December 1805 – 22 February 1873), also recorded as Alexander Clavel-Oswald and Alexander Clavel-Linder in 19th-century Basel sources, was a French-born Swiss textile industrialist and silk dyer who, in 1859, began producing the synthetic dye fuchsine in Basel. In 1873 he sold his works to Bindschedler & Busch, the predecessor of the Gesellschaft für Chemische Industrie in Basel [Society for the Chemical Industry in Basel] (Ciba). His early adoption of synthetic dyes and his move to the Basel-Klybeck district were pivotal in Basel's emergence as a European center of the dye and chemical industries.

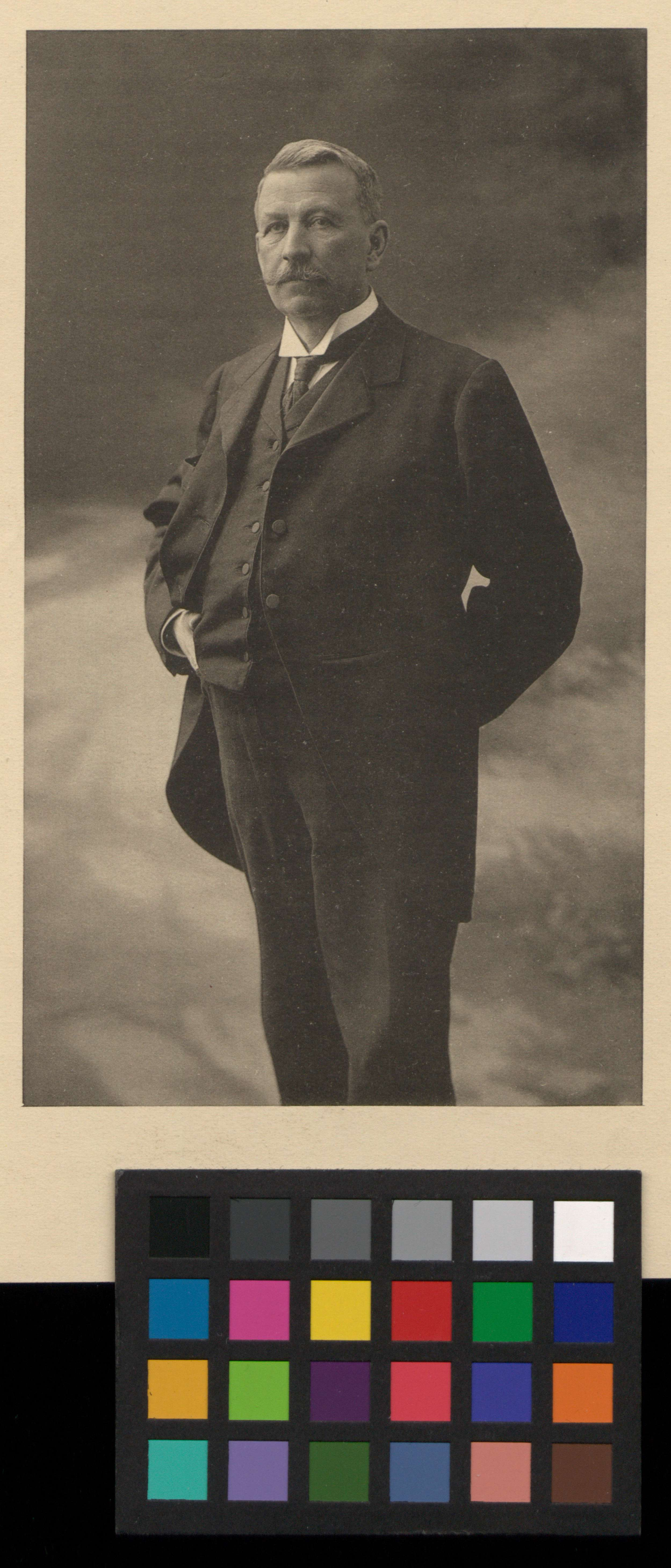
Portrait of Alexander Clavel-Merian (1847–1910), son of the founder (Basel University Library).

== Early life and family ==
Clavel (Note: Contemporary Basel sources and later authority files record variants of his name such as Alexander Clavel-Oswald and Alexander Clavel-Linder. The hyphenated forms reflect the Swiss Allianzname [Alliance name] custom, common in the 19th century and still practiced today, by which a married person, sometimes even the husband, may append the surname of the spouse or, in Clavel's case, of his wife's late husband whose business he inherited. The practice has long been socially accepted in Switzerland but has never been part of the official civil name.) was born in Lyon in 1805 and trained as a silk dyer.

== Career ==
He settled in Basel in 1838 and married Henriette Linder, widow of silk dyer Karl Theodor Oswald, taking over the Oswald dye works at the Bläsihof in Kleinbasel. Through business and family links with Lyon dyers, he followed developments in coal-tar dye chemistry emerging from France and Britain.

In 1859, Clavel began manufacturing fuchsine (also marketed as magenta or aniline red) for the silk ribbon trade in Basel, one of the earliest such ventures in Switzerland. Fuchsine belongs to the triarylmethane class; in 19th-century trade literature it was often called aniline red, but that term was used loosely for related red aniline dyes and is not chemically precise. Modern historical reviews distinguish fuchsine/magenta from looser uses of aniline red.

Complaints about fumes from arsenic-based processes led Basel authorities to restrict aniline-red production; in 1864 Clavel moved the works to the Klybeckstrasse on the Rhine, creating a "Laboratorium für Fabrikation von Anilin- und anderen Farben" [Laboratory for the production of aniline and other dyes]. The move marked a shift of colour chemistry to Basel's outskirts and foreshadowed the city's industrial expansion.

In 1873, weeks before his death, his dye plant was sold to the chemist Robert Bindschedler and the businessman Albert Busch (Bindschedler & Busch), whose partnership was reorganized in 1884 as the Gesellschaft für Chemische Industrie in Basel (Ciba).

== Personal life ==
Clavel became a naturalized citizen of Basel in 1849. He and his wife Henriette Linder had one son, Alexander Clavel-Merian (1847–1910), who continued the family business; the later industrialists Alexander Clavel-Respinger (1881–1973) and René Clavel (1886–1969) were his grandsons.

== Death and legacy ==
Clavel died in Basel on 22 February 1873.

Clavel's enterprise established the lineage that grew into Ciba-Geigy and later Novartis. Basel's chemical-industrial surge was driven by such early dye makers and the relocation to Klybeck.

== See also ==
- Aniline dye
- Synthetic dye
