= Villa Domergue =

- Interactive map of the Villa Domergue area

General information
- Type: House
- Location: Avenue Fiesole, Cannes, France
- Completed: 1926
- Client: Jean-Gabriel Domergue
- Owner: City of Cannes

The Villa Domergue is a historic mansion in Cannes. It was built in 1926 for painter Jean-Gabriel Domergue. The garden was designed from 1926 to 1936. The house was turned into a museum in honor of Domergue from 1962 to 1973, and it was subsequently used as an official venue by the city of Cannes. It has been listed as an official historical monument since 1990. During the annual Cannes Film Festival, the jury meets in the house to pick the winners.
