= Women in art =

Women in art may refer to:

- Art featuring women as subjects
- Women artists
  - Lists of women artists
- Women in Arts Award, a Ukrainian award
- Women in the art history field
- Women in Philippine art
- Women in dance
- Women in music
- Women in film
