= Tamara de Lempicka =

Polish painter (1894–1980)

- Tamara Łempicka
- Autoportrait (Tamara in a Green Bugatti), 1929
- Born: Tamara Rozalia Gurwik-Górska; 16 June 1894; Warsaw, Congress Poland (Note: Warsaw was then part of Congress Poland, under the control of the Russian Empire.)
- Died: 18 March 1980 (aged 85); Cuernavaca, Mexico
- Education: Académie de la Grande Chaumière in Paris
- Notable work: The Dream (1927); Self-portrait, Tamara in a Green Bugatti (1929); The Musician (1929); Adam and Eve (1932)
- Style: Art Deco
- Spouses: Tadeusz Łempicki (m. 1916; div. 1931) Raoul Kuffner de Diószegh (m. 1934; died 1961)
- Children: Maria Krystyna 'Kizette' Łempicka Foxhall (daughter) (ca. 1919–2001)
- Relatives: Adrienne Górska, architect (sister)
- Website: www.delempicka.org

Tamara Łempicka (pronounced [taˈmara wɛmˈpit͡ska]; 16 June 1894 – 18 March 1980), known outside Poland as Tamara de Lempicka, was a Polish painter who spent her working life in France and the United States. She is best known for her polished Art Deco portraits of aristocrats and the wealthy, and for her highly stylized paintings of nudes.

Born in Warsaw, she briefly moved to Saint Petersburg where she married Tadeusz Łempicki, a prominent Polish lawyer, then travelled to Paris. She studied painting with Maurice Denis and André Lhote. Her style was a blend of late, refined cubism and the neoclassical style, particularly inspired by the work of Jean-Dominique Ingres. She was an active participant in the artistic and social life of Paris between the wars. In 1928, she became the mistress of Baron Raoul Kuffner, a wealthy art collector from the former Austro-Hungarian Empire, divorcing Tadeusz Łempicki that same year. After the death of Kuffner's wife in 1933, Łempicka married Kuffner in 1934, and thereafter she became known in the press as "The Baroness with a Brush".

Following the outbreak of World War II in 1939, she and her husband moved to the United States and she painted celebrity portraits, as well as still lifes and, in the 1960s, some abstract paintings. Her work was out of fashion after World War II, but made a comeback in the late 1960s, with the rediscovery of Art Deco. She moved to Mexico in 1974, where she died in 1980. At her request, her ashes were scattered over the Popocatépetl volcano.

== Early life ==
=== Warsaw and St. Petersburg (1894–1917) ===
She was born on 16 June 1894 in either Warsaw, which was then part of Congress Poland, or in St. Petersburg, though the widely accepted place of birth is Warsaw. Her father was Boris (born Benno) Gurwik-Górski, a Russian-Jewish attorney for a French trading company, and her mother was Malwina Dekler, a Polish-Jewish socialite who had lived most of her life abroad and who met her husband at one of the European spas. Both of her parents were baptized in 1891 in the Warsaw congregation of the Polish Reformed Church; Tamara and her two siblings, Stanisław and Adrianna, were baptized as Protestant converts at Moscow's Reformed Church in 1897. Tamara's birth name was reported to be Tamara Rozalia Gurwik-Górska, (Note: Her full name according to Laura Claridge and Gioia Mori. Biographies by Lempicka-Foxhall; Néret; Blondel, Brugger and Gronberg 2004; and Bade also give her birth name as Tamara. Some other sources such as Helena Reckitt say her birth name was Maria.) although a 2024 documentary asserts that she was born Tamara Rosa Hurwitz.

Tamara was raised in Warsaw by her mother and grandparents, Bernard and Klementyna Dekler, who were members of the social and Polish cultural elite – they were friends with Ignacy Jan Paderewski and Artur Rubinstein. Their family grave is located in the Jewish cemetery on Okopowa Street in Warsaw. When Tamara was ten, her mother commissioned a pastel portrait of her by a prominent local artist. She detested posing and was dissatisfied with the finished work. She took the pastels, had her younger sister pose, and made her first portrait.

In 1911, her parents sent her to a boarding school in Lausanne, Switzerland, but she was bored and she feigned illness to be permitted to leave the school. Instead, her grandmother took her on a tour of Italy, where she developed her interest in art. After her parents divorced in 1912, she chose to spend the summer with her wealthy Aunt Stefa in Saint Petersburg. There, in 1915, she met and fell in love with a prominent Polish lawyer, Tadeusz Łempicki (1888–1951). Her family offered him a large dowry, and they were married 30 December 1915 in a Roman Catholic church in Tsarskoye Selo (earlier studies claimed a 1916 marriage in the chapel of the Knights of Malta in St. Petersburg).

The Russian Revolution in November 1917 overturned their comfortable life. In December 1917, Tadeusz Łempicki, who was believed to be a member of the Tsar's secret police, was arrested in the middle of the night by the Cheka, the Soviet secret police. Tamara searched the prisons for him, and with the help of the Swedish consul, to whom she offered her favors, she secured his release. They traveled to Copenhagen then to London and finally to Paris, where Tamara's family had also found refuge.

== Career ==
=== Paris (1918–1939) ===
In Paris, the Łempickis lived for a while from the sale of family jewels. Tadeusz proved unwilling or unable to find suitable work. Their daughter, Maria Krystyna "Kizette", was born around 1919, adding to their financial needs. Lempicka decided to become a painter at her sister's suggestion, and studied both at the Saint Petersburg Academy of Arts and Académie de la Grande Chaumière with Maurice Denis and then with André Lhote, who was to have a greater influence on her style. Her first paintings were still lifes and portraits of her daughter Kizette and her neighbor. She sold her first paintings through the Galerie Colette-Weil, which allowed her to exhibit at the Salon des Indépendants, the Salon d'Automne, and the Salon des moins de trente ans, for promising young painters. She exhibited at the Salon d'automne for the first time in 1922. During this period, she signed her paintings "Lempitzki"—the masculine form of her name.

Her breakthrough came in 1925, with the International Exhibition of Modern Decorative and Industrial Arts, which later gave its name to the style Art Deco. She exhibited her paintings in two of the major venues, the Salon des Tuileries and the Salon des femmes peintres. Her paintings were spotted by American journalists from Harper's Bazaar and other fashion magazines, and her name became known. In the same year, she had her first major exposition in Milan, Italy, organized for her by Count Emmanuele Castelbarco. For this show, Lempicka painted 28 new works in six months. During her Italian tour, she took a new lover, the Marquis Sommi Picenardi. She was also invited to meet the famous Italian poet and playwright Gabriele d'Annunzio. She visited him twice at his villa on Lake Garda, seeking to paint his portrait; he, in turn, was set on seduction. After her unsuccessful attempts to secure the commission, she went away angry, while d'Annunzio also remained unsatisfied.

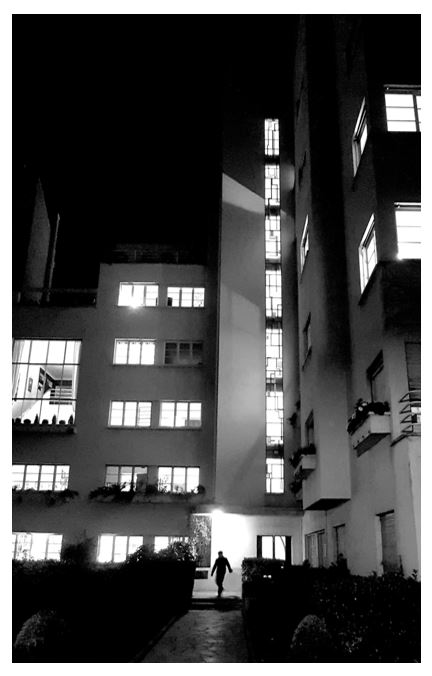
Façade of 7, rue Méchain, her Paris studio

In 1927, Lempicka won her first major award, the first prize at the Exposition Internationale des Beaux Arts in Bordeaux, France, for her portrait of Kizette on the Balcony. In 1929, another portrait of Kizette, at her First Communion, won a bronze medal at the international exposition in Poznań, Poland.

In 1928 she was divorced from Tadeusz Łempicki. That same year, she met Raoul Kuffner, a baron of the former Austro-Hungarian Empire and an art collector. His title was not an ancient one; his family had been granted the title by the second-to-last Austro-Hungarian Emperor, Franz-Joseph I, because Kuffner's family had been the supplier of beef and beer to the imperial court. He owned properties of considerable size in eastern Europe. He commissioned her to paint his mistress, the Spanish dancer Nana de Herrera; after its completion, Lempicka and the baron began their relationship. She bought an apartment on Rue Méchain in Paris and had it decorated by the modernist architect Robert Mallet-Stevens and her own sister Adrienne de Montaut. The furniture was by René Herbst. The austere, functional interiors appeared in decoration magazines.

In 1929, Lempicka painted one of her best-known works, Autoportrait (Tamara in a Green Bugatti), for the cover of the German fashion magazine Die Dame. This showed her at the wheel of a Bugatti racing car wearing a leather helmet and gloves and wrapped in a gray scarf, a portrait of cold beauty, independence, wealth, and inaccessibility. In fact, she did not own a Bugatti automobile; her own car was a small yellow Renault, which was stolen one night when she and her friends were celebrating at La Rotonde in Montparnasse.

She traveled to the United States for the first time in 1929 to paint a portrait of Joan Jeffery, the fiancée of the American oilman Rufus T. Bush, and to arrange a show of her work at the Carnegie Institute in Pittsburgh. The exposition was a success, but the money she earned was lost when the bank she used collapsed following the stock market crash of 1929. The portrait of Jeffery was completed but put into storage following the couple's divorce in 1932. It was sold by Christie's in 2004 following the death of Joan (now Vanderpool).

Lempicka's career reached a peak during the 1930s. She painted portraits of King Alfonso XIII of Spain and Queen Elizabeth of Greece and museums began to collect her works. In 1933, she traveled to Chicago, where her paintings were shown alongside those of Georgia O'Keeffe, Santiago Martínez Delgado, and Willem de Kooning. Despite the Great Depression, she continued to receive commissions and showed her work at several Paris galleries.

The wife of Baron Kuffner died in 1933. De Lempicka married him on 3 February 1934 in Zurich. She became alarmed by the rise of the Nazis and persuaded her husband to sell most of his properties in Hungary and to move his fortune and his belongings to Switzerland.

=== The United States and Mexico (1939–1980) ===
In the winter of 1939, following the outbreak of World War II, Lempicka and her husband moved to the United States. They settled first in Los Angeles. The Paul Reinhard Gallery organized a show of her work, and they moved to Beverly Hills, settling into the former residence of the film director King Vidor. Shows of her work were organized at the Julian Levy Gallery in New York, the Courvoisier Galleries in San Francisco, and the Milwaukee Institute of Art, but her shows did not have the success she had hoped for. Her daughter Kizette was able to escape from occupied France via Lisbon and joined them in Los Angeles in 1941. Kizette married a Texas geologist, Harold Foxhall. In 1943, Baron Kuffner and de Lempicka relocated to New York City.

In the postwar years, she continued a frenetic social life, but she had fewer commissions for society portraits. Her art deco style looked anachronistic in the period of postwar modernism and abstract expressionism. She expanded her subject matter to include still lifes, and in 1960 she began to paint abstract works and to use a palette knife instead of her smooth earlier brushwork. She sometimes reworked earlier pieces in her new style. The crisp and direct Amethyste (1946) became the pink and fuzzy Girl with Guitar (1963). She had a show at the Ror Volmar Gallery in Paris in May and June 1961, but it did not revive her earlier success.

Baron Kuffner died of a heart attack in November 1961 on the ocean liner Liberté en route to New York. Following his death, Lempicka sold many of her possessions and made three around-the-world trips by ship. In 1963, Lempicka moved to Houston, Texas, to be with Kizette and her family and retired from her life as a professional artist. She continued to repaint her earlier works. She repainted her well-known Autoportrait (1929) twice between 1974 and 1979; Autoportrait II was sold, though she hung Autoportrait III in her retirement apartments, where it would remain until her death. The last work she painted was the fourth copy of her painting of St. Anthony.

In 1974, she decided to move to Cuernavaca, Mexico. After the death of her husband in 1979, Kizette moved to Cuernavaca to take care of de Lempicka, whose health was declining. De Lempicka died in her sleep on 18 March 1980. Following her wishes, her ashes were scattered over the volcano Popocatépetl.

== Rediscovery ==
A resurgence of interest in Art Deco began in the late 1960s. A retrospective of her work was held at the Luxembourg Gallery in Paris in summer 1972, and received positive reviews. An extensive catalogue was published in Italy by editor Franco Maria Ricci in 1977. After her death, her early Art Deco paintings were being shown and purchased once again. A stage play, Tamara, was inspired by her meeting with Gabriele D'Annunzio and was first staged in Toronto; it then ran in Los Angeles for eleven years (1984–1995) at the Hollywood American Legion Post 43, making it the longest running play in Los Angeles, and some 240 actors were employed over the years. The play was also subsequently produced at the Seventh Regiment Armory in New York City. In 2005, the actress and artist Kara Wilson performed Deco Diva, a one-woman stage play based on Lempicka's life. Her life and her relationship with one of her models are fictionalized in Ellis Avery's novel The Last Nude, which won the American Library Association Stonewall Book Awards Barbara Gittings Literature Award for 2013.

The Fine Arts Museums of San Francisco organized Tamara de Lempicka, a retrospective of de Lempicka's career. The exhibit was shown at the de Young Museum from October 12, 2024 – February 9, 2025; it later traveled to the Museum of Fine Arts, Houston from March 9–July 6, 2025. The exhibition catalog was edited by Gioia Mori and Furio Rinaldi. ISBN 978-0-300-27850-7

== Style and subjects ==
Lempicka's own description of her work:

I was the first woman to make clear paintings, and that was the origin of my success ... Among a hundred canvases, mine were always recognizable. The galleries tended to show my pictures in the best rooms, because they attracted people. My work was clear and finished. I looked around me and could only see the total destruction of painting. The banality in which art had sunk gave me a feeling of disgust. I was searching for a craft that no longer existed; I worked quickly with a delicate brush. I was in search of technique, craft, simplicity and good taste. My goal: never copy. Create a new style, with luminous and brilliant colors, rediscover the elegance of my models.

She was one of the best-known painters of the Art Deco style, a group which included Jean Dupas, Diego Rivera, Josep Maria Sert, Louis Lozowick, and Rockwell Kent, but unlike these artists, who often painted large murals with crowds of subjects, she focused almost exclusively on portraits.

Her first teacher at the Académie Ranson in Paris was Maurice Denis, who taught her according to his celebrated maxim: "Remember that a painting, before it is a war horse, a nude woman or some anecdote, is essentially a flat surface covered with colors assembled in a certain order". He was primarily a decorative artist, who taught her the traditional craftsmanship of painting. Her other influential teacher was André Lhote, who taught her to follow a softer, more refined form of cubism that did not shock the viewer or look out of place in a luxurious living room. Her cubism was far from that of Pablo Picasso or Georges Braque; for her, Picasso "embodied the novelty of destruction". Lempicka combined this soft cubism with a neoclassical style, inspired largely by Ingres, particularly his famous Turkish Bath, with its exaggerated nudes crowding the canvas. Her painting La Belle Rafaëlla was especially influenced by Ingres. Lempicka's technique, following Ingres, was clean, precise, and elegant, but at the same time charged with sensuality and a suggestion of vice. The cubist elements of her paintings were usually in the background, behind the Ingresque figures. The smooth skin textures and equally smooth, luminous fabrics of the clothes were the dominant elements of her paintings.

Known especially for her portraits of wealthy aristocrats, she also painted highly stylized nudes. The nudes are usually female, whether depicted alone or in groups; Adam and Eve (1931) features one of her few male nudes. After the mid-1930s, when her Art Deco portraits had gone out of fashion and "a serious mystical crisis, combined with a deep depression during an economic recession, provoked a radical change in her work", she turned to painting more traditional subject matter in the same style. She painted a number of Madonnas and turbaned women inspired by Renaissance paintings, as well as mournful subjects such as The Mother Superior (1935), an image of a nun with a tear rolling down her cheek, and Escape (1940), which depicts refugees. Of these, art historian Gilles Néret wrote, "The baroness's more 'virtuous' subjects are, it must be said, lacking in conviction when compared with the sophisticated and gallant works on which her former glory had been founded". Lempicka introduced elements of Surrealism in paintings such as Surrealist Hand (c. 1947) and in some of her still lifes, such as The Key (1946). Between 1953 and the early 1960s, Lempicka painted hard-edged abstractions that bear a stylistic similarity to the Purism of the 1920s. Her last works, painted in warm tones with a palette knife, have usually been considered her least successful.

== Personal life ==
Lempicka placed a high value on working to produce her own fortune, famously saying, "There are no miracles, there is only what you make". She took this personal success and created a hedonistic lifestyle for herself, accompanied by intense love affairs within high society.

Her daughter Kizette rarely saw Lempicka but was immortalized in her paintings. Lempicka painted her repeatedly, creating a striking portrait series: Kizette in Pink (1926), Kizette on the Balcony (1927), Kizette Sleeping (1934), Portrait of Baroness Kizette (1954–1955), among others. Some of Lempicka's other paintings depict women who resemble Kizette.

=== Bisexuality ===
Lempicka was bisexual. Her affairs with both men and women were conducted in ways that were considered scandalous at the time. She often used formal and narrative elements in her portraits, and her nude studies included themes of desire and seduction. In the 1920s, she became closely associated with lesbian and bisexual women in writing and artistic circles, among them Violet Trefusis, Vita Sackville-West, and Colette. Her close friend and lover the French poet Ira Perrot was the subject of at least eight of Lempicka's paintings as well as several drawings during the 1920s and 1930s. Most notable among these was Lempicka's acclaimed Portrait of Ira P. (1931), featuring Ira in a sinuous white satin gown and red shawl, holding an armful of white calla lilies. After Lempicka's daughter Kizette, no other subject was featured as frequently in Lempicka's art as Perrot. Lempicka also became involved with Suzy Solidor, a nightclub singer at the Boîte de Nuit, whose portrait she later painted.

== Legacy ==
American singer Madonna is an admirer and collector of Lempicka's work. Madonna has featured Lempicka's work in her music videos for "Open Your Heart" (1987), "Express Yourself" (1989), "Vogue" (1990) and "Drowned World/Substitute for Love" (1998). She also used paintings by Lempicka on the sets of her 1987 Who's That Girl, 1990 Blond Ambition, and 2023 Celebration Tour world tours.

Other notable Lempicka collectors include actor Jack Nicholson, singer-actress Barbra Streisand, and fashion designer Wolfgang Joop.

Robert Dassanowsky's book Telegrams from the Metropole: Selected Poems 1980–1998 includes the poems "Tamara de Lempicka" and "La Donna d'Oro" dedicated to Kizette de Lempicka.

Lempicka's paintings are featured on the UK book covers of Atlas Shrugged and The Fountainhead by Ayn Rand.

On 16 May 2018, in celebration of the 120th anniversary of her birth, Google made her the subject of the daily Google Doodle.

In July 2018, a biographical musical, Lempicka, premiered at the Williamstown Theatre Festival. The show later played at the La Jolla Playhouse in 2022 and on Broadway from April to May 2024. The musical starred Eden Espinosa as Łempicka and was directed by Tony winner Rachel Chavkin. In April 2024, Espinosa was nominated for a Tony Award for her portrayal.

From September 2022 until March 2023, the National Museum in Kraków held a major exhibition of her works from museums and private collections in Europe and the USA entitled Łempicka.

In January 2023, Jeff Ruby Culinary Entertainment, a Cincinnati, Ohio-based, multistate restaurant company, named its first specialized event space The Lempicka to acknowledge the influence of her aesthetic on the interior design of its restaurants. The center opened in June 2023.

The True Story of Tamara de Lempicka & The Art of Survival is a 2024 feature documentary about the painter through her artwork. The film covers her rise in 1920s Paris, her move to the United States, and her revival in the current art market. The documentary includes newly found archival evidence regarding Lempicka's birthdate and the Hurwitz family's conversion from Judaism to Calvinism.

== Art market ==
In November 2019, the Lempicka painting La Tunique rose (1927) was sold at Sotheby's for $13.4 million. In February 2020, her painting Portrait of Marjorie Ferry (1932) set a record for a work by Lempicka by fetching £16.3 million ($21.2 million) at the Impressionist and Modern Art Evening Sale at Christie's, London. In June 2025, the Lempicka painting La Belle Rafaëla (1927) was sold at Sotheby's for £7.47 million ($10.05 million).
