= Charles Nicod =

French architect

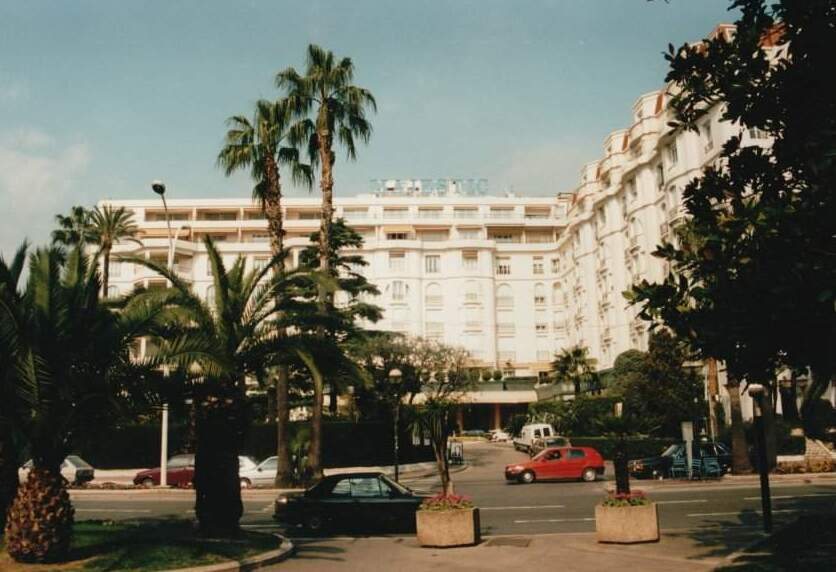
Hotel Majestic, Cannes, (2006)

Charles Henri Nicod (28 January 1878, Levier, Doubs – December 1967) was a French architect active in the period between the two World Wars. He was the winner of the Prix de Rome in 1907. His works include the Hotel Majestic in Cannes. His wife was Marie Leclère (1893–1978).
