= 1932 in art =

Events from the year 1932 in art.

== Events ==
- April 6–19 – German art dealer Otto Wacker is tried and convicted in Berlin for selling forged paintings he attributed to Vincent van Gogh and sentenced to 19 months in prison.
- June 16 – Pablo Picasso's retrospective exhibition opens at the Galeries Georges Petit in Paris, displaying 225 paintings.
- June 25 – An article in The Saturday Evening Post (US) claims that the 1911 theft of Leonardo da Vinci's Mona Lisa was partly masterminded by a forger named Yves Chaudron.
- August 2 – The Saint Petersburg Union of Artists is established (as the "Leningrad Union of Soviet Artists").
- October – Courtauld Institute of Art opens in London.
- October–November – Exhibition Carvings by Barbara Hepworth, Paintings by Ben Nicholson at the Arthur Tooth & Sons gallery in London.
- November 15 – First exhibition of Group f/64 photographers opens at the de Young Museum in San Francisco.
- November 30 – Exhibition American Folk Art: The Art of the Common Man in America 1750–1900 opens at the Museum of Modern Art in New York City.
- Alvar Aalto designs a new form of laminated bent-plywood furniture.
- The Wedgwood pottery firm in England first commissions designs from Keith Murray.
- First Abstraction-Création Cahier, Abstraction-création: Art non-figuratif, is produced.
- Sale of the late 12th century Japanese emakimono Kibi Daijin Nittō Emaki to the Museum of Fine Arts, Boston in the United States causes the Japanese government to impose restrictions on sale of significant artistic works from the country.

== Works ==
=== Graphic art ===
- George Ault – Hoboken Factory
- Frank Brangwyn – British Empire Panels
- Salvador Dali – The Invisible Man
- Stuart Davis – Men Without Women
- Otto Dix – The War (triptych)
- Edward Hopper
  - Room in Brooklyn
  - Room in New York
- Lois Mailou Jones – The Ascent of Ethiopia
- Frieda Kahlo
  - Henry Ford Hospital
  - My Birth
  - Self Portrait on the Border Line Between Mexico and the United States
- Paul Klee – Ad Parnassum
- Fernand Leger – Composition with Three Figures
- Tamara de Lempicka
  - Adam and Eve
  - Portrait of Marjorie Ferry
- René Magritte – The Universe Unmasked
- Kazimir Malevich – Red Cavalry
- Henri Matisse – The Dance II (mural)
- Rolf Nesch – Elbe Bridge I
- Algernon Newton – Outskirts of Cheltenham
- Ben Nicholson – Au Chat Botté
- Winifred Nicholson
  - The Artist's Children, Kate and Jake, at the Isle of Wight
  - Kate and Jake on the Isle of Wight
- Pablo Picasso
  - Femme à la montre
  - Girl Before a Mirror
  - La Lecture
  - Nude in a Black Armchair
  - Nude, Green Leaves and Bust
  - Reclining Nude
  - Reclining Nude (another version)
  - Reclining Nude (another version)
  - Le Repos
  - Le Rêve
- Charles Sheeler
  - River Rouge Plant
  - Interior with Stove (conté crayon)
- Amrita Sher-Gil
  - Young Girls
  - Young Man with Apples
- Walter Sickert – Miss Earhart's Arrival (Tate Gallery, London)
- David Alfaro Siqueiros – América Tropical (fresco)
- Xul Solar – Palacio Almi
- Stanley Spencer completes his series of paintings at Sandham Memorial Chapel, Burghclere
- Grant Wood – Daughters of Revolution

=== Photographs ===
- Henri Cartier-Bresson – Derrière la gare de Saint-Lazare
- Charles Clyde Ebbets – Lunch atop a Skyscraper
- John Heartfield – photomontages
  - Adolf, the Superman
  - The Meaning of Geneva, Where Capital Lives, There Can Be No Peace

=== Sculptures ===
- Alberto Giacometti – Woman with her Throat Cut
- Alfred Gilbert – Queen Alexandra Memorial
- Barbara Hepworth – Pierced Form
- Joseph Klein – Statue of Thomas E. Watson
- Käthe Kollwitz – The Grieving Parents
- Gaston Lachaise – Standing Woman
- Leo Lentelli – The James Cardinal Gibbons Memorial Statue
- Alonzo Victor Lewis – American Doughboy Bringing Home Victory (Seattle)
- Frederick William MacMonnies – American Monument
- Hermon Atkins MacNeil – Confederate Defenders of Charleston
- Paul Manship
  - Abraham Lincoln: The Hoosier Youth
  - Group of Bears
- Henry Moore – Half-figure
- Felix Nylund – Three Smiths Statue (Helsinki)
- Rodgers and Poor – Kill Devil Hill Monument

== Awards ==
- Archibald Prize: Ernest Buckmaster – Sir William Irvine

== Births ==
- February 9 – Gerhard Richter, German painter
- March 2 – Benedetto Robazza, Italian sculptor (d. 2000)
- March 10 – Euan Uglow, English painter (d. 2000)
- March 14 – Norval Morrisseau, Aboriginal Canadian artist (d. 2007)
- April 10 – James Lee Byars, American artist (d. 1997)
- April 19 – Fernando Botero, Colombian painter and sculptor (d. 2023)
- May 3 – Walter Hopps, American museum director and curator (d. 2005)
- May 4 – Ivor Wood, English stop-motion animator (d. 2004)
- May 14 – Yuri Khukhrov, Russian painter (d. 2003)
- June 5 – Christy Brown, Irish author, painter and poet (d. 1981)
- June 6 – Ivan Chermayeff, English-born American graphic designer (d. 2017)
- June 25 – Peter Blake, English pop artist
- July 20 – Nam June Paik, South Korean-born American video artist (d. 2006)
- August 6 – Howard Hodgkin, English painter (d. 2017)
- August 17 – Jean-Jacques Sempé, French cartoonist and illustrator (d. 2022)
- August 19 – Jacques Lob, French comic book creator (d. 1990)
- August 23 – Valentina Monakhova, Russian painter and graphic artist (d. 2017)
- October 4 – Terence Conran, English designer (d. 2020)
- October 14 – Wolf Vostell, German artist (d. 1998)
- October 22 – Afewerk Tekle, Ethiopian painter and stained glass artist (d. 2012)
- October 29 – R. B. Kitaj, American-born English artist (d. 2007)
- December 7 – Paul Caponigro, American photographer
- December 16 – Quentin Blake, English illustrator
- December 26 – Ken Howard, English painter (d. 2022)
- date unknown – Basil Blackshaw, Northern Irish painter (d. 2016)

== Deaths ==
- January 15 – John Henry Dearle, English textile designer (b. 1859)
- February 6 – Hermann Ottomar Herzog, German American landscape painter (b. 1832)
- February 11 – Robert Gibb, Scottish painter (b. 1845)
- February/March – Armand Point, French painter and graphic artist (b. 1860/1)
- March – Elizabeth Taylor, American traveller and artist (b. 1856)
- March 5 – Johan Thorn Prikker, Dutch art nouveau painter and stained-glass artist (b. 1868)
- March 11 – Dora Carrington, English Bloomsbury Group painter and designer (b. 1893)
- March 21 – Georg Dehio, Baltic German art historian (b. 1850)
- March 23 – Boris Schatz, Lithuanian Jewish sculptor (b. 1866)
- March 25 – Harriet Backer, Norwegian painter (b. 1845)
- April 2 – Ella Gaunt Smith, American doll-maker (b. 1868)
- June 6 – Alois Dryák, Czech architect and designer (b. 1872)
- July 14 – Dimitrie Paciurea, Romanian sculptor (b. 1873 or 1875)
- July 19 – Louis Maurer, German American lithographer (b. 1832)
- July 21 – Samuel P. Dinsmoor, American sculptor (b. 1843)
- August 4 – Alfred Henry Maurer, American modernist painter, son of Louis (suicide; b. 1868)
- September 20 – Max Slevogt, German artist (b. 1868)
- September 23 – Jules Chéret, French painter and lithographer (b. 1836)
- September 28 – Emil Orlík, Austro-Hungarian etcher and lithographer (b. 1870)
- October 1 – W. G. Collingwood, English painter and author (b. 1854)
- October 2 – Carl Seffner, German portrait sculptor (b. 1861)
- October 17 – Lucy Bacon, American Impressionist painter (b. 1857)
- October 23 – Daniel Hernández Morillo, Peruvian painter (b. 1856)
- November 30 – Gari Melchers, American naturalist painter (b. 1860)
- December 8 – Gertrude Jekyll, English garden designer (b. 1843)
- December 9 – Karl Blossfeldt, German photographer and sculptor (b. 1865)

== See also ==
- 1932 in fine arts of the Soviet Union
