= Men Without Women =

Men Without Women may refer to:

- Men Without Women (Hemingway short story collection), a 1927 collection of short stories by Ernest Hemingway
- Men Without Women (Murakami short story collection), a 2017 collection of short stories by Haruki Murakami
- Women Without Men (novella), a 1989 novella by Shahrnush Parsipur
- Men Without Women (film), a 1930 war drama
- Men Without Women (album), a 1982 album by Steven Van Zandt as "Little Steven & The Disciples of Soul"
- Men Without Women (mural), a 1932 mural by Stuart Davis
- "Men Without Women" (The IT Crowd), a 2007 television episode
- "Men Without Women" (Porridge), a 1974 television episode
