= Brother Brown =

Brother Brown may refer to:

- Brother Brown (duo), a Danish house music duo
- Brother Brown (painting), a painting by Lois Mailou Jones
- Brother Brown (American football), college football player
