= Portrait of Hudson =

1932 painting by Lois Mailou Jones

- Artist: Lois Mailou Jones
- Year: 1932
- Medium: Oil on canvas
- Dimensions: 61 cm × 45.7 cm (24 in × 18.0 in)
- Location: Museum of Fine Arts; Boston

Portrait of Hudson is a painting by Lois Mailou Jones. It is in the collection of the Museum of Fine Arts, Boston (MFA) in Boston, Massachusetts in the United States.

== Description ==
The painting is of a young man, from the chest up, looking to the side, away from the viewer. He wears a white dress shirt. He has short dark hair, a mustache, and brown eyes. It is signed on the right side by Jones reading: "Lois M Jones '32".

== History ==
Portrait of Hudson was completed by Jones in 1932. In 1994, it was owned by the Michael Rosenfeld Gallery. In October, the Rosenfeld sold it to John Axelrod in Boston. In 2011, he sold it to the MFA. The museum added it to their collection on June 22, 2011.

In 2001, Portrait of Hudson was exhibited in the group show A Studio of Her Own: Women Artists in Boston 1870-1940. The piece appeared in a retrospective of Jones' work at the MFA in 2013.

== Reception ==
In 2013, Boston Globe art critic Cate McQuaid described the expressions of the model in Portrait of Hudson, and another model in a portrait by Jones titled Negro Student, as being too "opaque" and that they "feel like models, not people." Tufts Daily described the Portrait of Hudson as displaying Jones' "technical mastery."
