= Hôtel de Ville, Meaux =

Town hall in Meaux, France

Hôtel de Ville
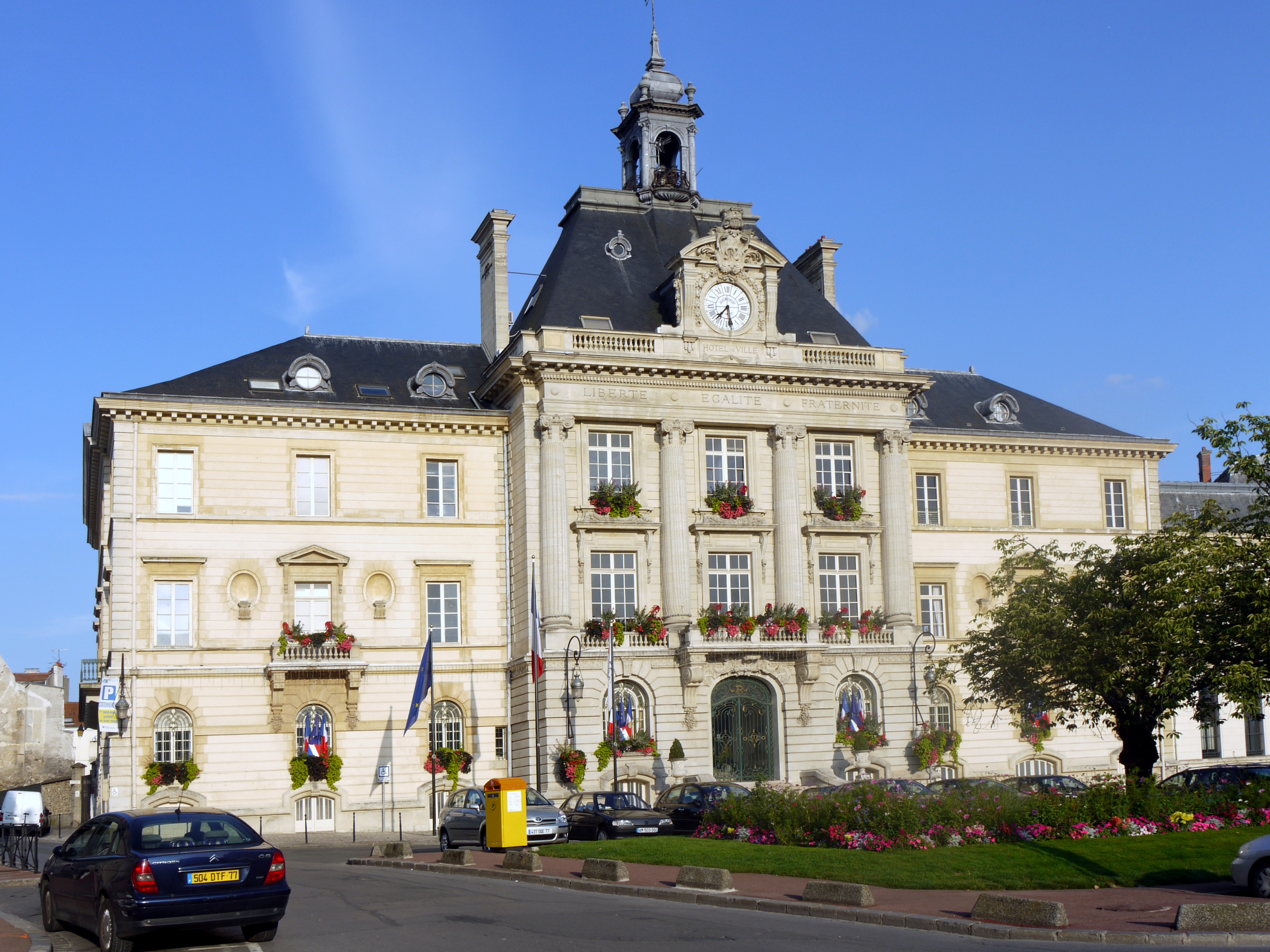
- The main frontage of the Hôtel de Ville in August 2010
- Interactive map of the Hôtel de Ville area

General information
- Type: City hall
- Architectural style: Neoclassical style
- Location: Meaux, France
- Coordinates: 48.9584°N 2.8779°E
- Completed: 1900

Design and construction
- Architect: Auguste Boudinaud

The Hôtel de Ville (French pronunciation: [otɛl də vil], City Hall) is a municipal building in Meaux, Seine-et-Marne, to the east of Paris, standing on Place de l'Hôtel-de-Ville.

== History ==
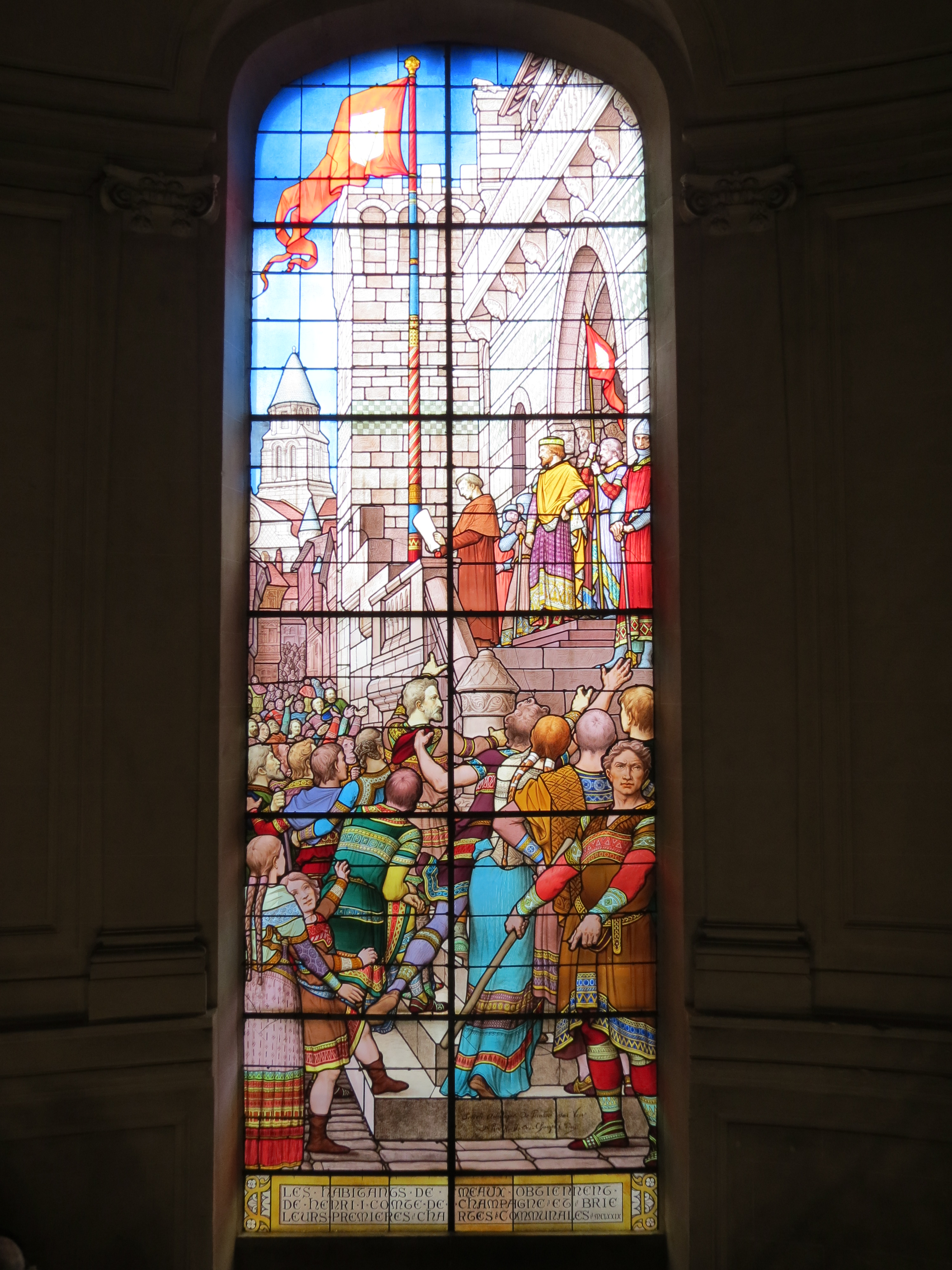
The stained glass window on the grand staircase

In the 18th century, a town hall was established in Meaux immediately to the north of the Château des Comtes de Champagne (Château of the Counts de Champagne), which was itself located on the north bank of the River Marne. By the early 19th century, the town hall was dilapidated and, in 1821, the town council led by the mayor, Augustin Veillet de Vaux, decided to demolish it and to erect a new town hall on the same site.

The foundation stone was laid by on 1 September 1828. Tradition has it that the stone was laid by King Charles X but local historians now consider this unlikely. The building was designed by Pierre Didier Prosper Savard in the neoclassical style, built in ashlar stone and was completed in 1833. The design involved a symmetrical main frontage of five bays facing north onto Place Henri Moissan. The central section of three bays, which was slightly projected forward, featured three round headed openings on the ground floor, three casement windows with cornices and a balcony on the first floor, and three plain casement windows on the second floor, all surmounted by a modillioned pediment with a clock in the tympanum. The outer bays were fenestrated in a similar style and there were quoins at the corners of the central section and at the corners of the building. The roof was surmounted by a small lantern. Internally, the principal rooms were the courtroom for the Justice de Paix (Justice of the Peace) on the ground floor, the Salle du Conseil (council chamber) and the Grande Salle d'Honneur (ballroom) on the first floor, and the library on the second floor. The building also accommodated a fire station until 1856, when a separate structure was erected to accommodate the fire service.

Following significant population growth in the second half of the 19th century, the old town hall was considered inadequate and the town council decided to extend it. The demolition of Château des Comtes de Champagne in the late 19th century increased the space available. The design involved a new façade of nine bays facing west onto what is now Place de l'Hôtel-de-Ville: this was achieved by adopting the west façade of the old town hall as the left section, erecting a completely new central section, and adapting a building to the south as the new right section. The enlarged town hall was officially opened by the Minister for Public Education and Fine Arts, Georges Leygues, on 4 March 1900.

The new central section featured a short flight of steps leading up to a segmental headed opening, which was flanked by two round headed windows. There were three squared-headed windows with cornices and a wide balcony on the first floor, and three plain square-headed windows on the second floor. The windows on the upper floors were flanked by four Ionic order columns supporting an entablature, a modillioned cornice and a balustraded parapet. The parapet was surmounted by a central clock which was flanked by pilasters supporting an open pediment containing a coat of arms. The outer sections were fenestrated by rounded headed windows on the ground floor and by square headed windows on the upper floors. Behind the clock, there was a steep roof which was surmounted by a square lantern with finials. Internally, the principal new rooms included a Salle des Mariages (wedding room) on the first floor of the new central section. A stained-glass window, depicting a crowd of local people gathered to hear the reading of the municipal charter granted by Henry I, Count of Champagne in 1179, was installed at the head of the grand staircase. Fine marble floors depicting serpents intertwined to create the letter "M" were created by the Italian artist, Henri Bichi, and installed in many of the rooms.

In September 1922, the former president of France, Raymond Poincaré, visited to town hall to commemorate the anniversary of the First Battle of the Marne, part of the First World War. This was followed with visits, in September 2023, by the former commander-in-chief of French forces on the Western Front, Generalissimo Joseph Joffre, in September 2024, by the Military governor of Paris, General Henri Gouraud, and, in September 1927, by the former Prime Minister of France, Paul Painlevé.

Following the liberation of the town by troops of the American Third Army, under General George S. Patton, on 27 August 1944, during the Second World War, a civic procession set off from the town hall to the war memorial in Place Paul Doumer, where a thanksgiving ceremony was held.

== Sources ==
- "Histoire, architecture et aménagement de l'Hôtel de Ville" (PDF). Town of Meaux. 2021.
