= Céline Marie Tabary =

French painter

- Born: 29 July 1908; Vermelles, France
- Died: 23 May 1993 (aged 84); France
- Known for: Painting, drawing
- Awards: Landscape Prize, National Museum, Washington, D.C., USA (1944)

Céline Marie Tabary (29 July 1908 – 23 May 1993) was an artist and arts professor at Howard University who championed African-American art in 1940s Washington, D.C. She emigrated from France in 1938, teaching and working in Washington, D.C. through the 1950s, before returning to France. Tabary won the Landscape Prize in 1944 from the National Museum, Washington, D.C.

== Personal life ==
Tabary was a lifelong friend and colleague of Lois Mailou Jones. The pair met at the Académie Julian in Paris in 1937. Tabary followed Jones back to the United States, emigrating to Washington, D.C. in 1938 and staying once unable to return to France with the outbreak of World War II.

Lois Mailou Jones credited Tabary as instrumental in her accolades, noting Tabary would take her paintings to juries when Jones could not due to policies barring participation by African Americans. These entries were significant in breaking the color barrier at the Corcoran Gallery in 1941.

Teaching art together in Washington, D.C., Tabary and Jones established “The Little Paris Studio” in 1945. Artists that benefited from the dynamic collective and atmosphere include fellow D.C. artist Alma Thomas.

== Paintings ==
Tabary's work includes Terrasse de café, Paris, (1950), (oil on canvas).

Her work was shown widely, including venues such as the Salon des Artistes Français, Paris; Institute of Modern Art, Boston; National Academy Museum and School; Barnett-Aden Gallery, Washington, DC; and Howard University, Washington, DC. She also showed work at the Corcoran Gallery and Whyte Gallery. Tabary also was a member of art organizations on both sides of the Atlantic, belonging to the Washington Watercolor Club and Artists Guild of Washington (US) and Societe des Artistes Lillois (France).

Tabary's work was also shown at the National Museum of Women in the Arts (NMWA) in the exhibit Preserving the Past, Securing the Future: Donations of Art, 1987-1997.
