= American Monument =

Statue in France by William MacMonnies

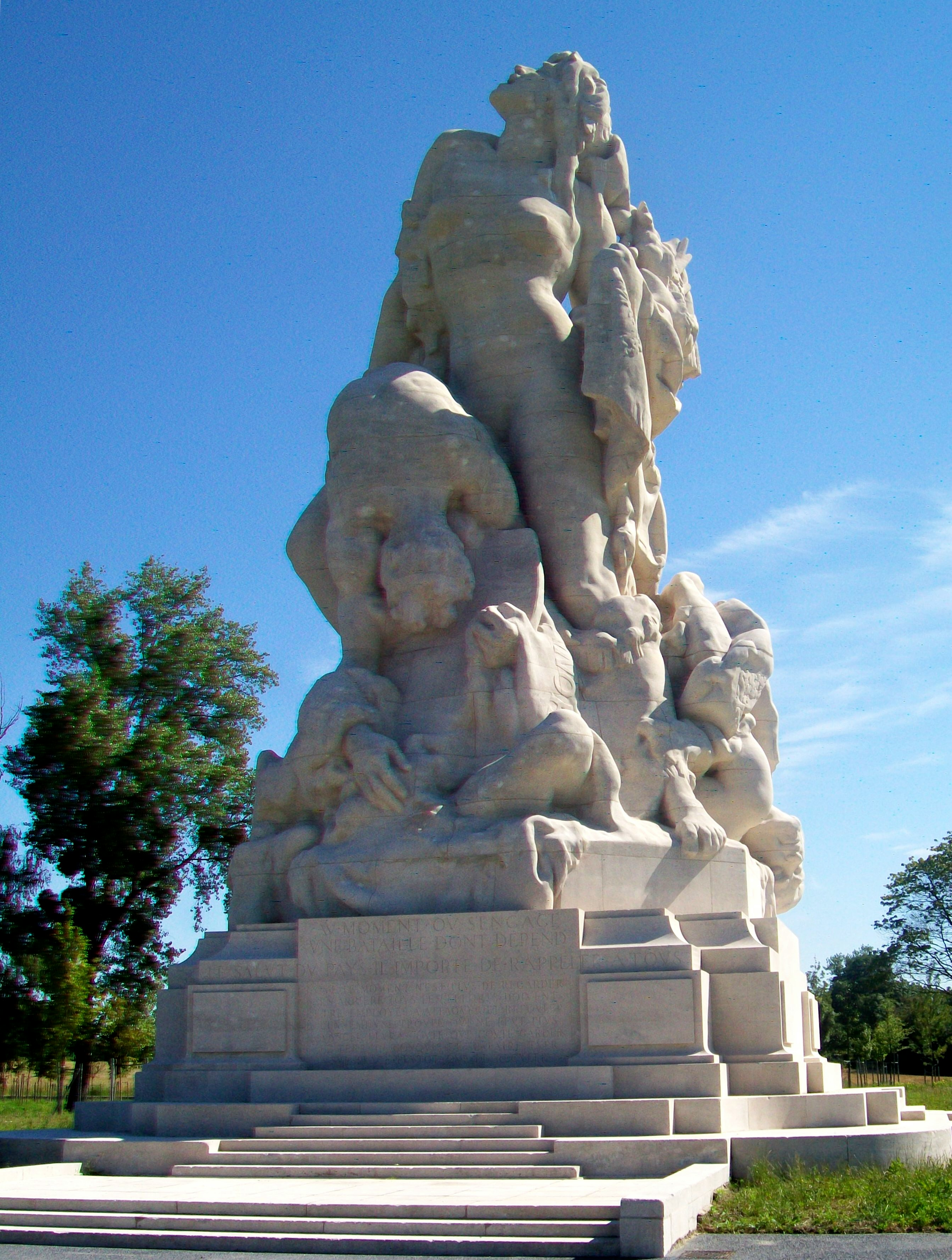
- The monument in 2012
- Location: Route de Varreddes; 77100 Meaux, France
- Coordinates: 48°58′22.8″N 2°54′18″E
- Designer: Frederick William MacMonnies; Edmondo Quattrocchi
- Type: Statue
- Material: Stone
- Length: 15 metres (49 ft)
- Width: 15 metres (49 ft)
- Height: 26 metres (85 ft)
- Dedicated date: September 1932
- Dedicated to: Allied troops who fought in the First Battle of the Marne

The American Monument, also known as Tearful Liberty or the Marne Battle Monument, is a large monumental statue in Meaux, France. It was designed by American sculptor Frederick William MacMonnies and dedicated in 1932 in honor of the Allied troops who died in the First Battle of the Marne during World War I.

== History ==
In 1914, during the First World War, German troops were advancing through northern France towards Paris. In September of that year, in the area near Meaux, the French Sixth Army launched an offensive against the German First Army. In the ensuing battle (known as the First Battle of the Marne), the French and British combined forces caused the Germans to retreat, saving Paris from attack. In the United States, French sympathizers celebrated the victory. Following the end of the war in 1918, there was an effort to erect a statue to commemorate the battle. A contest was held to determine the designer of this monument, with Frederick William MacMonnies's model being chosen. Funds for the monument were raised in the United States, and it was erected as a gift from Americans to the French people. MacMonnies collaborated with fellow American sculptor Edmondo Quattrocchi on part of the monument. Described as his most ambitious project, the monument would also be one of MacMonnies's last major commissions. The monument took 14 years to erect and was dedicated in September 1932. In attendance at the dedication ceremony were French President Albert Lebrun, President of the Council Édouard Herriot, and members of the American Friends of France and the Ambulance Corps of the American Field Service.

In 2011, the Musée de la Grande Guerre du pays de Meaux (Museum of the Great War of the country of Meaux) was opened next to the monument.

== Design ==
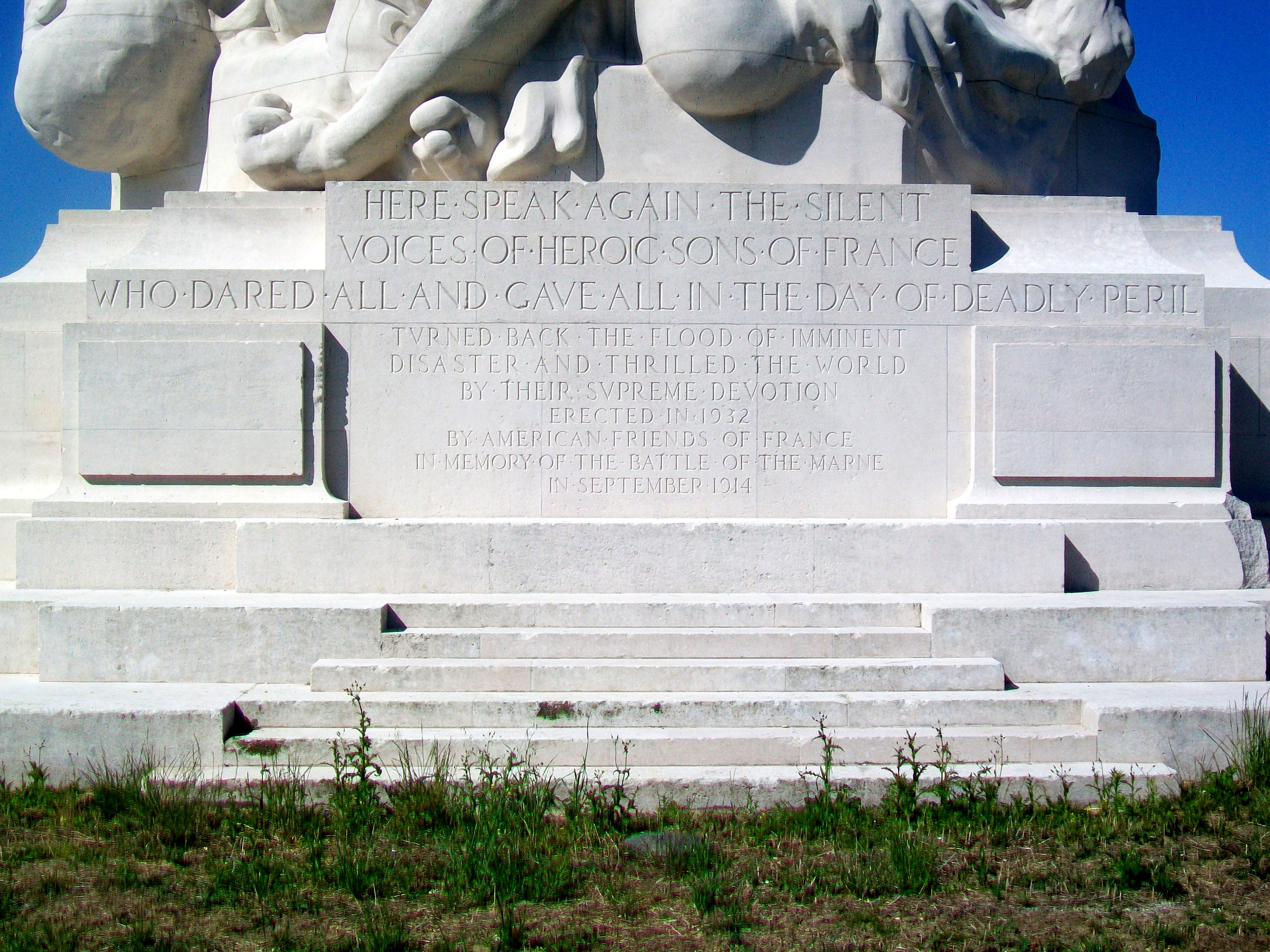
Inscription on the monument

The monument is a colossal structure that stands 26 metres (85 ft) tall. Each side of the base measures 15 metres (49 ft). The stone statue depicts a personification of Liberty surrounded by dead and dying people. This central figure is also referred to as Marianne or France Defiant. On top of the figure's right leg is a dead son, while she holds a baby in one hand and a broken sword in the other. The monument bears an inscription near the base which reads in part:

Here speak again the silent voices of the heroic sons of France who dared all and gave all in the day of deadly peril and turned back the flood of imminent disaster and thrilled the world by their supreme devotion.

== See also ==
- 1932 in art
