= Canton of Meaux =

Canton in Île-de-France, France

Coordinates: 48.96°N 2.88°E

The canton of Meaux is an administrative division of the Seine-et-Marne department, in northern France. It was created at the French canton reorganisation which came into effect in March 2015. Its seat is in Meaux. It consists of the commune of Meaux.
