= Meaux =

- Subprefecture and commune
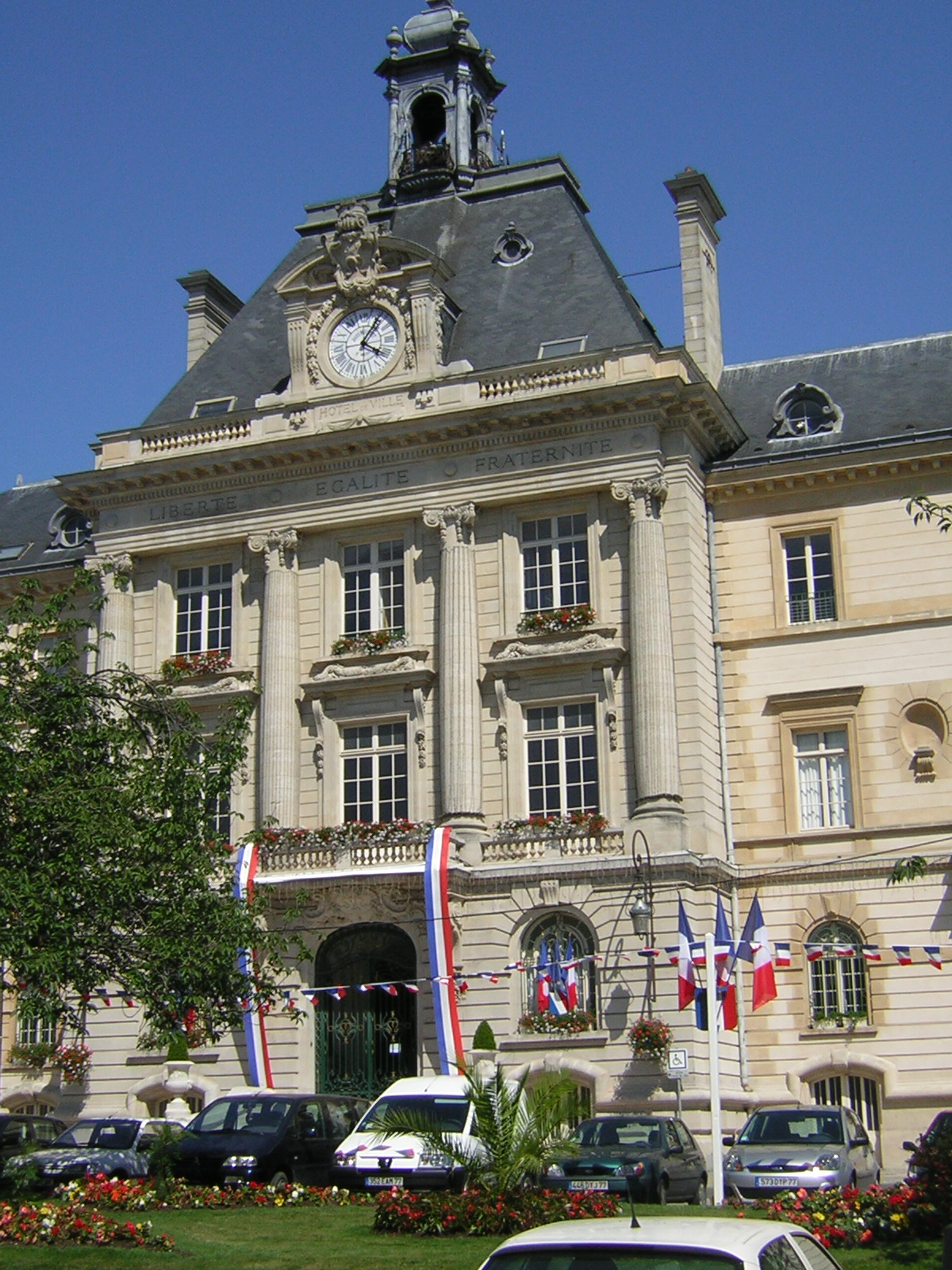
- Main façade of the Hôtel de Ville, completed in 1900

- Coat of arms
- Location of Meaux
- Location within France Location within Île-de-France (region)
- Coordinates: 48°57′37″N 2°53′18″E
- Country: France
- Region: Île-de-France
- Department: Seine-et-Marne
- Arrondissement: Meaux
- Canton: Meaux
- Intercommunality: Pays de Meaux

Government
  - Mayor (2020–2026): Jean-François Copé
- Area^{1}: 14.95 km^{2} (5.77 sq mi)
- Highest elevation: 107 m (351 ft)
- Lowest elevation: 39 m (128 ft)
- Population (2023): 56,905
  - Density: 3,806/km^{2} (9,858/sq mi)
- Time zone: UTC+01:00 (CET)
  - Summer (DST): UTC+02:00 (CEST)
- INSEE/Postal code: 77284 /77100
- ^{1} French Land Register data, which excludes lakes, ponds, glaciers > 1 km^{2} (0.386 sq mi or 247 acres) and river estuaries.

Meaux (French pronunciation: [mo]) is a commune on the river Marne in the Seine-et-Marne department in the Île-de-France region in the metropolitan area of Paris, France. It is 41.1 km (25.5 mi) east-northeast of the centre of Paris.

Meaux is, with Provins, Torcy and Fontainebleau, one of the four subprefectures (sous-préfectures) of the department of Seine-et-Marne, Melun being the prefecture. In France a subprefecture is the chef-lieu (the seat or administrative capital) of an arrondissement: Meaux is the subprefecture of the arrondissement of Meaux. It is also the chef-lieu of a smaller administrative division: the canton of Meaux. Finally, since its creation in 2003, Meaux has been the centre and the main town of an agglomeration community, the Communauté d'agglomération du Pays de Meaux.

== Demographics ==
With a population of 56,905 inhabitants in 2023, Meaux is the most populous city in the Seine-et-Marne department, just before Chelles.

Historical population

Year	Pop.	±% p.a.
1793	6,860	—
1800	6,648	−0.45%
1806	6,573	−0.19%
1821	7,375	+0.77%
1831	8,537	+1.47%
1836	7,809	−1.77%
1841	9,000	+2.88%
1846	9,382	+0.83%
1851	9,900	+1.08%
1856	10,491	+1.17%
1861	10,762	+0.51%
1866	11,343	+1.06%
1872	11,202	−0.21%
1876	11,739	+1.18%
1881	12,525	+1.30%
1886	12,291	−0.38%
1891	12,833	+0.87%
1896	13,520	+1.05%
1901	13,690	+0.25%

Year	Pop.	±% p.a.
1906	13,921	+0.34%
1911	13,600	−0.47%
1921	13,541	−0.04%
1926	14,190	+0.94%
1931	14,169	−0.03%
1936	14,429	+0.36%
1946	14,223	−0.14%
1954	16,767	+2.08%
1962	22,251	+3.60%
1968	30,167	+5.20%
1975	42,243	+4.93%
1982	45,005	+0.91%
1990	48,305	+0.89%
1999	49,421	+0.25%
2007	48,466	−0.24%
2012	53,623	+2.04%
2017	54,991	+0.51%
2023	56,905	+0.57%

Source: EHESS and INSEE (1968-2023)

== History and culture ==
Inhabitants of Meaux are called Meldois. Both names Meaux and Meldois originated with the Meldi, the Latin name of the original Gaulish tribe who occupied this area of the valley of the Marne river. Although during the Roman period the city was called Iantinum by the Romans, the name of the Meldi persisted and was finally kept for naming both the city and its inhabitants.

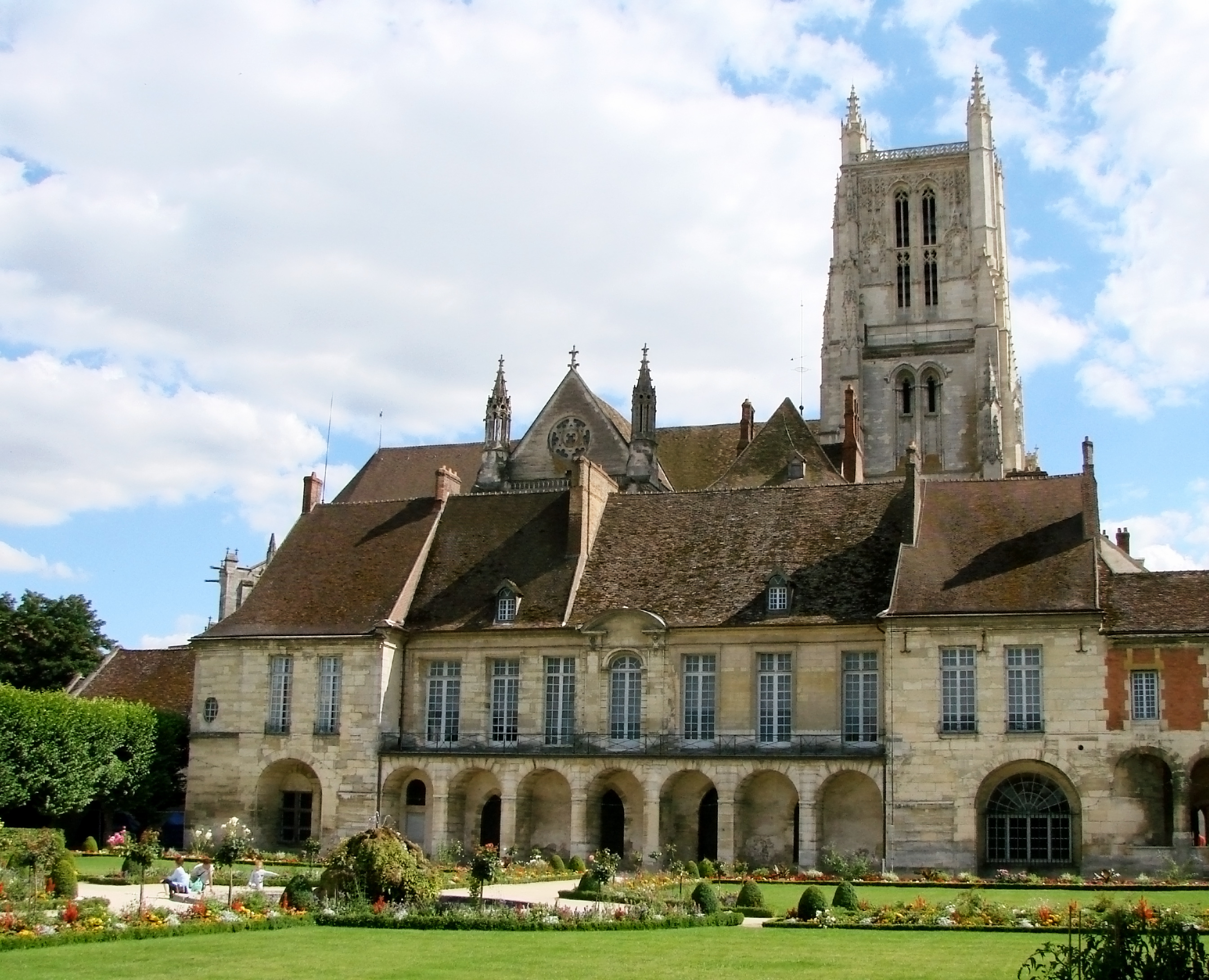
The episcopal palace (bishop's palace). Meaux Cathedral can be seen behind the palace.

Historical buildings and monuments in Meaux are mainly located in the old city, inside the old defensive walls, still nowadays partially kept thanks to an important segment of the original surrounding wall from the Gallo-Roman period. A meander of the Marne river divides the old city into the North Quarter (called among the Meldois as the Cathedral Quarter) and the South Quarter (known among the locals as the Market Quarter). In the North Quarter there is the Meaux Cathedral, the episcopal palace and its gardens (outlining the shape of a bishop's mitre), the old seat of the chapter (le vieux chapitre), part of the defensive walls (as mentioned), some keeps and towers, and the archaeological remains of the sanctuary of La Bauve, all-embracing the Gaulish period (4th, 3rd and 1st centuries BC), the era of the early Roman Empire (Gallo-Roman: 1st, 2nd and 3rd centuries AD) and the early Christian Era and subsequent centuries (from the 3rd to the 18th centuries, with the remains, among others, of the Saint-Faron Abbey, demolished during the French Revolution). The South Quarter of the old city mainly includes the historic covered market and the Canal Cornillon, built during the Middle Ages, in the year 1235. Centuries later, in 1806, during the Napoleonic era, was built the Canal de l'Ourcq, destined to the inland navigation when the Marne river is not navigable because of temporary sandbanks.

At 73, Rue du Marché stood the house of Etienne Mangin in which he started the first Calvin-inspired Protestant church in France. The house was ordered by the Parliament in Paris to be razed and a chapel built in its place following the execution at the stake of fourteen members of the congregation for heresy in 1546. Rather than a chapel, there remains a fairly nondescript building on the site to this day with a plaque which bears the following inscription (translated): "Here stood the house of ETIENNE MANGIN in which was constructed the first Reformed Church of France. In front of this location 14 Reformists, arrested during a cult, were burned on 8 October 1546 at the decree of the Parliament in Paris on 4 October 1546. Offered by the City of Meaux 1985."

Meaux is nowadays mainly known for Brie de Meaux (a variety of Brie cheese) and the local variety of mustard. Following the official administrative French AOC there are two designations of Brie de Meaux: Brie de Meaux fermier ("farm Brie de Meaux", made out of the milk from the cows of a single unique producer) and Brie de Meaux laitier (laitier, that is from the French lait, "milk", which designates here an agreement, a mixture of the milk of different producers). The Moutarde de Meaux ("Meaux Mustard") recipe is since the 18th century a label commercially owned by the Pommery company and is nowadays derived not only in its traditional well known form but also in a variety of new different ingredient combinations: Honey Mustard, Green Pepper Mustard, Moutarde Royale (that latter including Cognac in its composition) etc.

Several festivals and concerts are celebrated in Meaux, venues for live music like the Music Festival "Musik'elles" (usually at the end of every summer). There is a local public concert band in Meaux: L'Harmonie du Pays de Meaux. It is constituted by three different ensembles, following different ages: Les Minimes (children), Les Juniors (teenagers) and L'Harmonie de Meaux (adults). The band is also one of the two official music academies of the town. The other one is the conservatory of the city.

Also, every summer for more than 30 years, during several weekends per summer, a show is played by stage actors in the esplanade situated between the cathedral and the episcopal palace: the Spectacle historique ("History show"). The show represents the history of Meaux all along the Middle Ages and the Renaissance, and also, more recently, during World War I (the German advance had been halted at Meaux in 1914 during the First Battle of the Marne).

There is only one cinema in Meaux: The Majestic, a former stage theatre. In modern days there are three stage theatres in the city. One is the Théâtre Gérard Philippe, a private theatre, situated close to the covered market. Not far from the market, in the same area but in a bigger and more recent building, there is the official subsidised theatre of the city, the Théâtre Luxembourg, divided in two separated auditoriums in the same building: the Salle Luxembourg (601 seats) and the Salle du Manège (107 seats). In an eastern area of Meaux, the Beauval quarter, there is the third stage theatre of the town, the Salle Champagne (200 seats), located in the Espace Caravelle, a building dedicated to cultural activities. Private theatre companies and community arts associations play in all three theatres.

Two museums can be found in Meaux: the Musée Bossuet (located in the episcopal palace, this is the art and history museum of Meaux) and the Musée de la Grande Guerre du pays de Meaux [fr] (the largest World War I Museum in the world). The Hôtel de Ville was completed in 1900.

== Relevant historical episodes ==
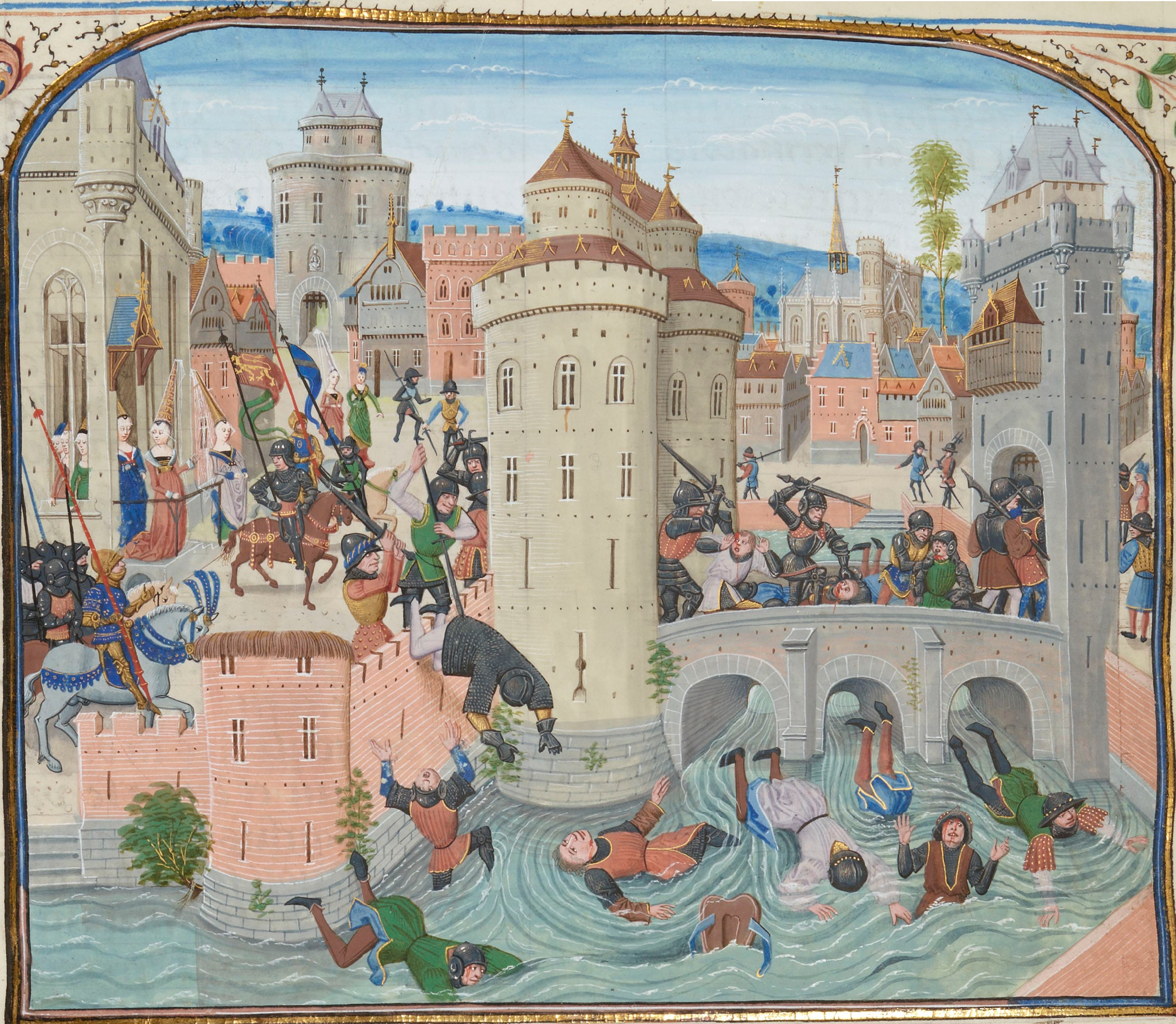
Defeat of the Jacquerie in Meaux on 9 June 1358

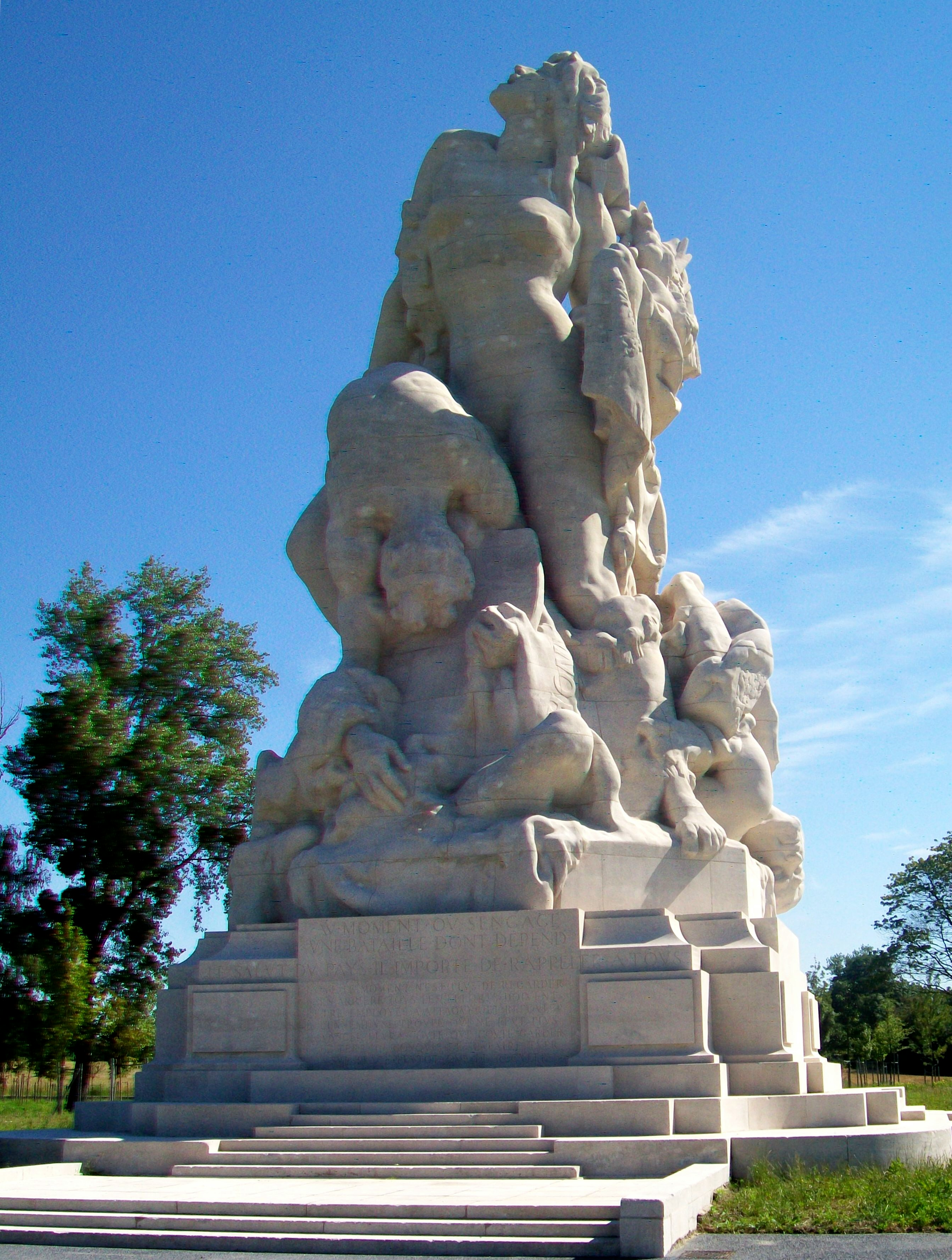
La Liberté éplorée or "The American Monument", erected to the memory of the French casualties during the Battle of the Marne

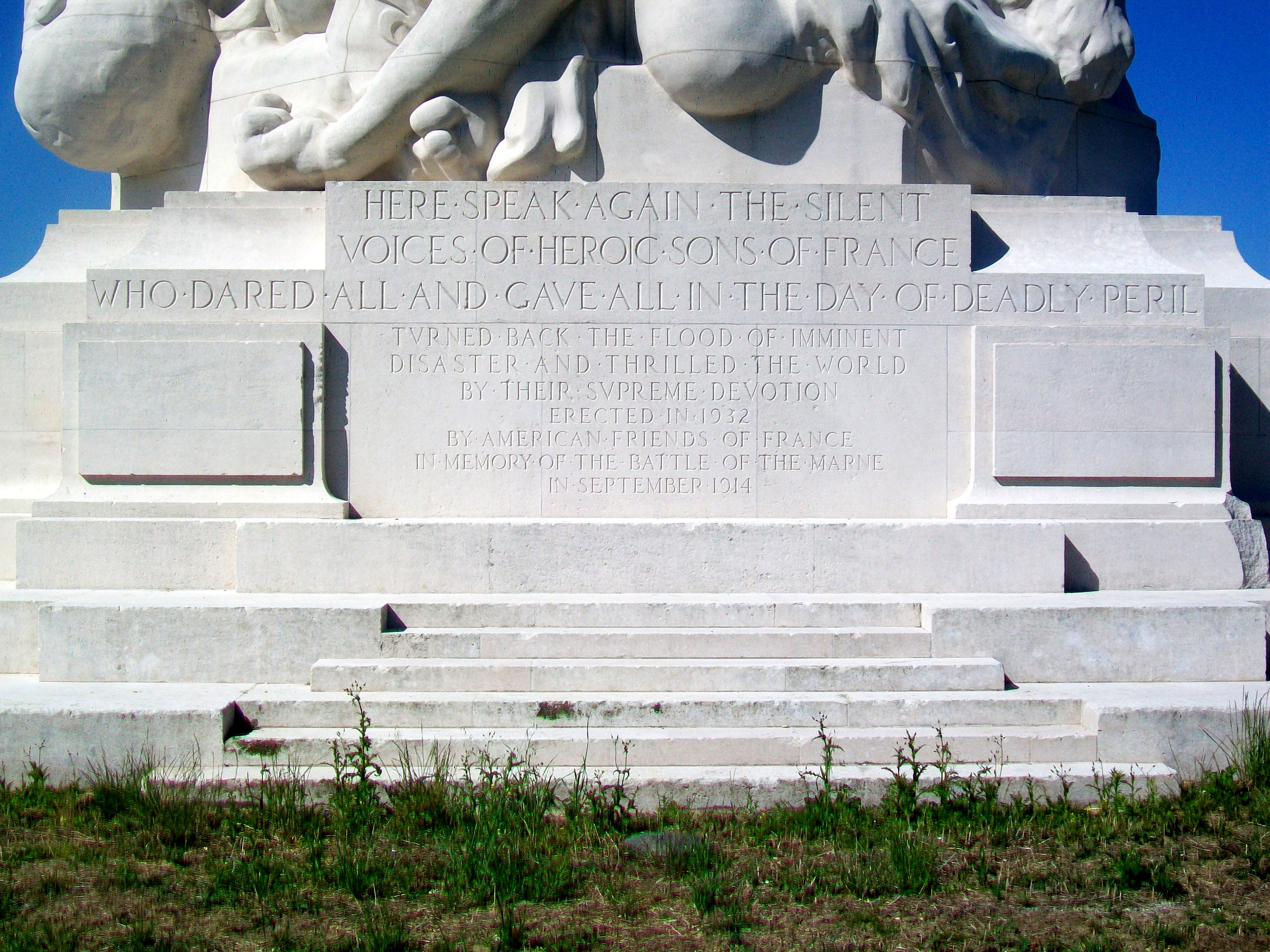
The inscription in the slab, at the pedestal of the monument, in the rear side. The front side inscription is in French

=== Middle Ages: Siege of Meaux ===
The Siege of Meaux took place between October 1421 and May 1422, during the Hundred Years' War between England and France. The besiegers were the English, under Henry V. The town's defence was led by the Bastard of Vaurus, notorious for his savagery. The siege commenced on October 6, 1421, and mining and bombardment soon brought down the walls. Casualties began to mount in the English army, including John Clifford, 7th Baron de Clifford who had been at the siege of Harfleur, the Battle of Agincourt, and received the surrender of Cherbourg. The English also began to fall sick rather early into the siege, and it is estimated that one sixteenth of the besiegers died from dysentery and smallpox. On 9 March 1422, the town surrendered, although the garrison held out. Under continued bombardment, the garrison gave in as well on 10 March, following a siege of six months. The Bastard of Vaurus was decapitated, as was a trumpeter named Orace, who had once mocked King Henry. Sir John Fortescue was then installed as English Captain of Meaux Castle.

=== World War I: First Battle of the Marne ===
During the First Battle of the Marne (September 1914), the German troops were stopped at the gates of Meaux. This heroic action not only prevented the city from being taken by the Germans but also changed the course of the war. In 1932, at the place of the battlefield, the people of the United States of America had a monument erected in the memory of the French soldiers fallen in action. Called, in French, La Liberté éplorée ("The Tearful Liberty"), the sculpture by Frederick MacMonnies is popularly known among the French as Le Monument américain ("the American Monument"). Coordinates: 48.973°N 2.905°E
In 2011, beside the monument was built the Museum of the Great War (Musée de la Grande Guerre du pays de Meaux [fr]).

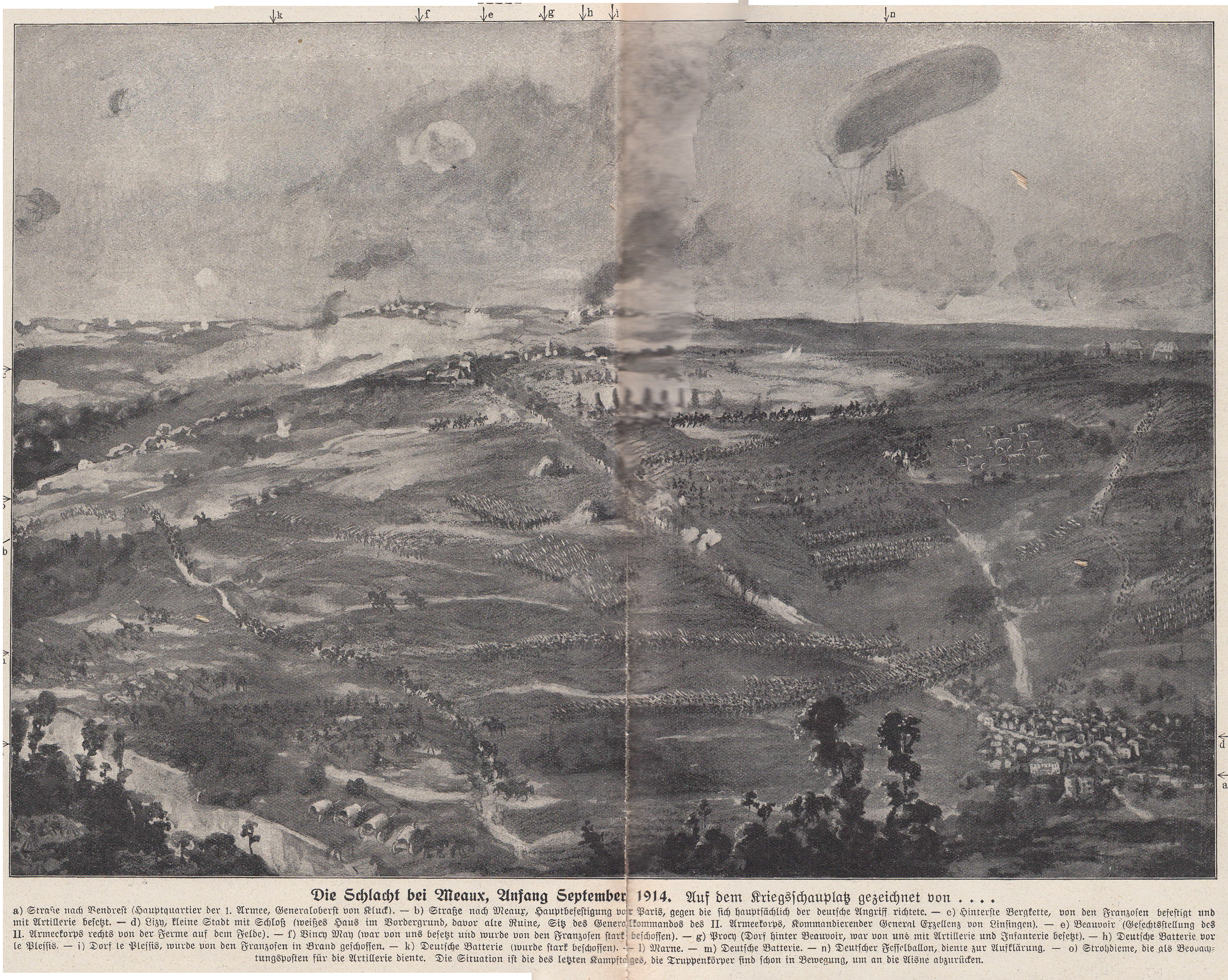
The battle of Meaux September 1914

== Sports ==
The town is represented by the CS Meaux association football club. Many other sports are also practiced in Meaux like rugby or field hockey, especially water sports. There are in Meaux, for example different sporting clubs dealing with canoeing (mainly practiced in the Canal de l'Ourcq), scuba diving (the club "Asterina", named after a starfish genus, trains in the swimming pools of the city), swimming (Club sportif Meaux Natation).

== Transport ==
Meaux is served by Meaux station on the Transilien Paris – Est suburban rail line and on several national rail lines. The rail line connecting Paris to Meaux was established in 1849. The nowadays SNCF train station, still in use, was built in 1890.

Alongside the Meaux rail station, there is also the main bus station in the city, with more than 30 bus lines serving the whole eastern Paris metropolitan area.

Charles de Gaulle Airport is nearby, located 29 km (18 mi) north west of the Meaux. The airport can easily be reached by bus and car.

== Education ==
The commune has 36 public preschools and elementary schools.

Public junior high schools in Meaux:

- C.E.S. Beaumarchais
- C.E.S. Camus
- C.E.S. Henri Dunant
- C.E.S. Frot
- C.E.S. Henri IV

Public senior high schools in Meaux:

- Lycée Jean-Vilar
- Lycée Moissan
- Lycée Pierre de Coubertin
- L.E.P. Charles Beaudelaire

Lycée du Gué A Tresme is in nearby Congis-sur-Thérouanne.

Private Catholic secondary schools:

- Collège International Sainte-Marie
- Lycée Technologique, Professionnel et Post-Bac Jean Rose et son UFA
- Lycée Général International Bossuet et sa Filière Supérieure

== People ==
- Yechiel of Paris, rabbi and Tosafist, originally from Meaux
- John de Cheam died and is buried in Meaux.
- Philippe de Vitry, bishop of Meaux as of 1351, musical composer and author of the Ars Nova Notandi treatise.
- Jean Mocquet, traveller and royal apothecary.
- Jacques-Bénigne Bossuet, bishop of Meaux from 1681 to 1704, referred to as the "eagle of Meaux" ("l'aigle de Meaux").
- Jean-Baptiste de La Noue (1701–1760), 18th-century French playwright
- Virginie Courtier-Orgogozo, CNRS research director, biologist
- Gilbert du Motier, marquis de Lafayette (1757–1834), French député (delegate) and mayor of Meaux. One of the most trusted aides of George Washington during the American Revolutionary War, he was a general based in Virginia and led French and American troops against the British.
- Albert Guillon (1801–1854), composer
- Alexis Soyer (1810–1858), celebrated chef in Victorian London, was born here.
- Léon Charles Thévenin (1857–1926), engineer, developed a famous theorem (under his name) for electrical circuits.
- L'Aigle de Meaux – fictional character. L'Aigle de Meaux (also Bossuet's nickname) was a character in Victor Hugo's Les Misérables, who petitioned for a post office to be created in Meaux.
- Joop Zoetemelk – Tour de France, Vuelta a España and UCI World Champion cyclist. Zoetemelk and his French wife owned and operated a hotel in Meaux, still open nowadays: Le Richemont.
- Jean-François Copé, current mayor of Meaux, député (delegate) for the 6th constituency of Seine-et-Marne, president (2012–2014) of the UMP (Union for a Popular Movement) group in the French National Assembly.
- Éric Judor, actor and comedian.
- Olivier N'Siabamfumu, footballer.
- Chris Mavinga, footballer.
- Lucas Digne, footballer.
- Djadja & Dinaz, rap duo.

== International relations ==
Meaux is twinned with:

- Basildon, England, United Kingdom
- Heiligenhaus, Germany

== Climate ==
Climate data for Meaux (Changis-sur-Marne) (1998–2020 normals, extremes 1998–present)
Month	Jan	Feb	Mar	Apr	May	Jun	Jul	Aug	Sep	Oct	Nov	Dec	Year
Record high °C (°F)	16.7 (62.1)	20.8 (69.4)	25.5 (77.9)	29.1 (84.4)	32.0 (89.6)	36.4 (97.5)	42.2 (108.0)	40.1 (104.2)	35.8 (96.4)	29.0 (84.2)	22.8 (73.0)	18.0 (64.4)	42.2 (108.0)
Mean daily maximum °C (°F)	7.1 (44.8)	8.5 (47.3)	12.5 (54.5)	16.6 (61.9)	20.0 (68.0)	23.5 (74.3)	25.8 (78.4)	25.7 (78.3)	22.0 (71.6)	16.8 (62.2)	10.9 (51.6)	7.7 (45.9)	16.4 (61.5)
Daily mean °C (°F)	4.6 (40.3)	5.2 (41.4)	8.0 (46.4)	11.2 (52.2)	14.6 (58.3)	17.9 (64.2)	19.9 (67.8)	19.7 (67.5)	16.5 (61.7)	12.7 (54.9)	7.9 (46.2)	5.2 (41.4)	11.9 (53.4)
Mean daily minimum °C (°F)	2.0 (35.6)	1.9 (35.4)	3.5 (38.3)	5.8 (42.4)	9.2 (48.6)	12.3 (54.1)	14.0 (57.2)	13.7 (56.7)	10.9 (51.6)	8.7 (47.7)	4.9 (40.8)	2.6 (36.7)	7.5 (45.5)
Record low °C (°F)	−14.2 (6.4)	−11.5 (11.3)	−9.6 (14.7)	−4.8 (23.4)	−0.5 (31.1)	2.4 (36.3)	6.8 (44.2)	5.9 (42.6)	1.8 (35.2)	−2.7 (27.1)	−10.4 (13.3)	−8.9 (16.0)	−14.2 (6.4)
Average precipitation mm (inches)	56.1 (2.21)	53.2 (2.09)	54.1 (2.13)	44.2 (1.74)	65.6 (2.58)	59.2 (2.33)	64.9 (2.56)	67.5 (2.66)	50.4 (1.98)	61.6 (2.43)	58.8 (2.31)	74.5 (2.93)	710.1 (27.96)
Average precipitation days (≥ 1.0 mm)	12.0	10.4	10.4	9.2	9.8	8.9	8.5	8.8	8.2	10.5	10.8	13.0	120.4
Source: Meteociel

== See also ==
- Counts of Meaux
- Roman Catholic Diocese of Meaux
- Meaux Abbey (UK)
- Battle of Mello
- Brie, a cheese
- Communes of the Seine-et-Marne department

== Bibliography ==
- Patrice Croisy: Bibliographie de Meaux (Meaux, 2006–2009). This database includes over 8 000 articles and books on Meaux and neighbourhood. Some of them are in English.
