= Les Fétiches =

Painting by Loïs Mailou Jones

- Artist: Lois Mailou Jones
- Year: 1938
- Medium: Oil on linen
- Dimensions: 64.7 cm × 54 cm (25.5 in × 21 in)
- Location: Smithsonian American Art Museum; Washington, D.C.

Les Fétiches is a painting by Lois Mailou Jones. It is in the collection of the Smithsonian American Art Museum in Washington, D.C. in the United States. It is one of many in her body of work featuring African masks and is one of her best-known paintings.

== Description ==
The painting comprises five different African masks painted in the style of modernism. A red religious fetish is also in the foreground. The masks and fetish appear to float in the mass of a black painted canvas.

== History ==
Les Fétiches was completed by Jones in 1938 in Paris. When Jones was attending high school, she met Grace Ripley, an academic and costume designer. Jones worked with Ripley after school and on Saturdays, where Jones would become familiar with exotic costumes and masks. Jones credits her work with Ripley's masks as the inspiration for Les Fétiches and an ongoing interest in masks.

When Jones died in 1998, it was one of a small selection of works displayed in a memorial exhibit at the Corcoran Gallery of Art. It was acquired by the Smithsonian with funding from Mrs. Norvin H. Green, Dr. R. Harlan, and Francis Musgrave. It was accessioned in the museum collection in 1990.

== Insight about Les Fétiches ==
The painting is considered a seminal work of Jones. Holland Cotter recognizes it as "an emblem of black American self-identity."
