= The Ascent of Ethiopia =

1932 painting by Lois Mailou Jones

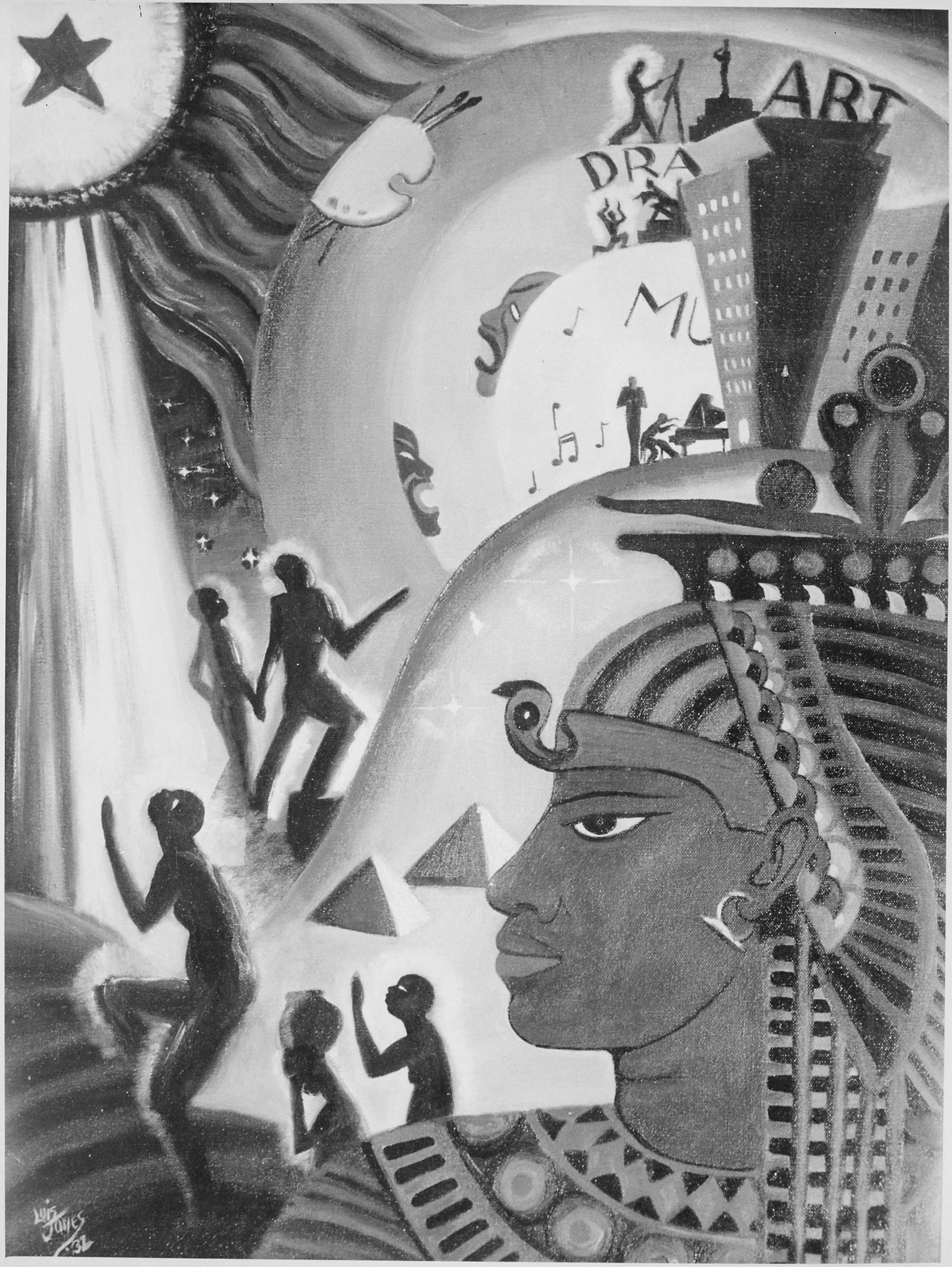
- A black-and-white reproduction of the painting
- Artist: Lois Mailou Jones
- Year: 1932
- Medium: Oil on canvas
- Movement: Harlem Renaissance
- Dimensions: 61.1 cm × 46.2 cm (24 1/16 in × 18 3/16 in)
- Location: Milwaukee Art Museum; Milwaukee

The Ascent of Ethiopia is a 1932 oil on canvas painting by American artist Lois Mailou Jones (1905–1998). It is in the collection of the Milwaukee Art Museum, in Milwaukee, Wisconsin.

The painting depicts the displacement of Black cultures and identities from their African birthplaces, symbolized here by Ancient Egypt and the Ethiopian Empire, all the way to the Americas, where they endure and find a new peak in the paintings, drama, and music of the contemporary Harlem Renaissance movement. Art historians and scholars of African-American history have variously described The Ascent of Ethiopia as a visual response to discourses of Pan-Africanism, Garveyism, Anticolonialism, and Black liberation, as well as to the events of the Great Migration of rural African American families to northern U.S. cities in the early 20th century.

== History ==
The Ascent of Ethiopia launched Lois Mailou Jones's career on a national stage. Jones stated in an interview that the painting was inspired by The Awakening of Ethiopia, a sculpted piece by Meta Warrick Fuller, although its imagery is also reminiscent of the works of painter Aaron Douglas. It was painted during the Harlem Renaissance, when Harlem was the epicenter of Black artistic culture.

== Description ==
In the bottom right corner of the painting is a figure, covering about one quarter of the canvas, wearing a blue and black headdress facing left with a profile view, watching others carry pots on their heads. These silhouettes are gesturing toward a glowing star in the top left corner, likely an allusion to W. E. B. Du Bois's 1911 pageant show The Star of Ethiopia. Some figures are holding hands while looking towards a city in the top right corner. All are moving to an elevated position in the painting, the city in the top right corner is composed of two big buildings where there are two entertainers in front; one is playing the piano while the other seems to be preparing to sing because there are music notes around him. Behind these two big buildings is a big round yellow circular object protruding from the side, surrounded by two blue/turquoise concentric circles. The yellow object has a face, and someone on a bended knee acting on top of it. The bigger turquoise circle has a face coming out towards the inside. Further up is someone painting on top of the blue circle with the words art above enclosed within the blue circle. A palette and brush are painted within that blue circle, the star in the top left corner has rays of squiggly blue, green, and black streaks that radiate diagonally. The star is inside of a yellow circle shining down on the people gesturing towards it.
