= Red Cavalry Riding =

1932 painting by Kazimir Malevich

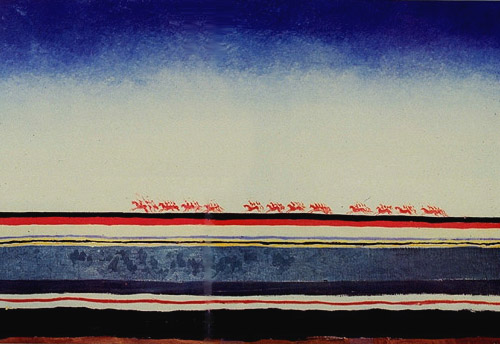
- Artist: Kazimir Malevich
- Year: 1932
- Medium: Oil on canvas
- Dimensions: 91 cm × 140 cm (36 in × 55 in)
- Location: Russian Museum, Saint Petersburg

Red Cavalry Riding (Russian: Скачет красная конница) is an oil on canvas painting around 1932 by the Russian avant-garde artist Kazimir Malevich. It is held in the Russian Museum, in Saint Petersburg.

It depicts Red Cavalry horsemen racing across a plain, the ground beneath them illustrated with Suprematist stripings of color. It is considered Malevich's only contribution into the official pantheon of Soviet art. Its recognition by the Soviets was ensured by the "politically correct" title of the painting. In addition, Malevich intentionally put "18 год" ("Year 18") in the lower right corner and wrote a short verse on the back: "Скачет красная конница из октябрьской столицы, на защиту советской границы" ("From the capital of the October Revolution, the Red Cavalry rides to defend the Soviet frontier").
