= The Invisible Man (painting) =

Painting by Salvador Dalí

- Artist: Salvador Dalí
- Year: 1929–1932
- Medium: oil on canvas
- Dimensions: 140 cm × 81 cm (55 in × 32 in)
- Location: Museo Nacional Centro de Arte Reina Sofía, Madrid

The Invisible Man is an oil on canvas by Spanish artist Salvador Dalí, created in 1929-1932. It is held in the Museo Nacional Centro de Arte Reina Sofía, in Madrid.

== History ==
Although left unfinished and considered a failed attempt at creating a good painting, it is Dalí's first canvas to feature a double image. While the painting did not satisfy the artist, he continued exploring visual illusions, later creating truly remarkable works. The idea for this piece was reportedly suggested by a book on Ancient Egypt, whose illustrations he had admired since childhood. It was also inspired by the works of Giuseppe Arcimboldo, an Italian Renaissance painter famous for creating human faces out of flowers, fruits, plants, animals, and objects.

Dalí considered The Invisible Man a paranoid fetish, a protector of himself and his wife, Gala Dalí. In The Secret Life of Salvador Dalí, he describes the character as an individual with a benevolent smile, capable of exorcising his fears. However, rather than a man, Dalí was actually thinking of Lidia Noguer, an eccentric peasant woman from Portlligat, from whom he and Gala had bought their first house.

This painting, for which a preparatory study is also known, would serve as a basis for some future works, such as Metamorphosis of Narcissus and The Great Paranoid.

== Description ==
In Dalí's painting, one can see a seated figure of gigantic, elongated proportions. The individual's head is formed by the shadows and contours of buildings and sculptures set far in the background. Clouds simulate hair, while two blue spheres represent the eyes. The unfinished right arm is partly formed by the back of a statue of a woman with a disproportionate neck.

The left arm is formed by a column and is defined by the dark building in the foreground on the right side of the painting. This structure also features two sculptures of dissected women in different colors.

In the lower-center area, there is a mannequin-like figure with long hair that rises and forks at the top, thereby defining the giant's hands. The legs are formed by a waterfall and a section of the ground of the same blue color.

In front of the mannequin is a golden lion, a recurring motif in many of the artist's works. Other surreal elements in the painting serve a purely ornamental purpose. In the foreground on the right, there is a group of satirical sculptures depicting three men and three children.

On the left stands a pilaster topped by a sculpture of a woman's profile — another image that reappears across many of Dalí's paintings. Further back, a white horse stands upon a platform. Finally, above the giant's right hand, there is a strange, symmetrical shape that appears to be dissected.

== See also ==
- List of works by Salvador Dalí
