= Men Without Women (mural) =

1932 mural by Stuart Davis in New York City

- Artist: Stuart Davis
- Year: 1932
- Medium: Oil on canvas
- Location: MoMA on loan to Radio City Music Hall; New York City

Men Without Women is a 1932 mural by the American painter Stuart Davis executed in what the critic Hilton Kramer termed a "modified Cubist style". The work was commissioned for the Art Deco-style Radio City Music Hall at Rockefeller Center in New York City, where it hangs in the downstairs men's lounge. It was named by the Rockefeller Center art committee after Ernest Hemingway's second short story collection of the same name, which had been first published in the same year.

== History ==
Originally conceived for a show curated by Lincoln Kirstein at the Museum of Modern Art named "Murals by American Painters and Photographers", the Radio City Music Hall mural was an outgrowth of the exhibition wherein Davis was one of four artists commissioned from the survey to create a new work for Rockefeller Center, the new "skyscraper city within a city" (the other three having been Henry Billings, Louis Bouche, and Henry Varnum Poor).

In 1975 it was given to the Museum of Modern Art as a gift. This was an arrangement which included the restoration of the work after decades of casual damage to it, including countless wafts of cigarette and cigar smoke that had stained the canvas. The work was then loaned back to Radio City Music Hall during a renovation in 1999.
