= Brother Brown (painting) =

1931 painting by Lois Mailou Jones

- Artist: Lois Mailou Jones
- Year: 1931
- Medium: Watercolor on paper
- Dimensions: 47 cm × 34.3 cm (19 in × 13.5 in)
- Location: Smithsonian American Art Museum, Washington, D.C.

Brother Brown is a painting by Lois Mailou Jones. It is in the collection of the Smithsonian American Art Museum in Washington, D.C. in the United States. The painting is an early example of the Jones' regionalism work.

== Description ==
This painting depicts an African American man, Brother Brown, sitting on a park bench, smoking a pipe, under a tree. He has a cane on at his side, propped up against the bench. He wears a hat, white button-up shirt, suspenders, brown trousers and dark brown shoes. A large sack sits on the ground by him. "Potatoes" is written on the bag. The man looks at the towards the viewer.

== History ==
This painted was finished by Jones in 1931. It was donated as a bequest of the artist to the Smithsonian.

== Reception ==
Shaun La, contributor to AFROPUNK describes the piece as reflecting a "visual median between Post-Impressionism and Fauvism."
