= Benedetto Robazza =

Italian sculptor

Benedetto Rabazza (March 2, 1932- June 26, 2020) was an Italian sculptor.

Born just before the Second World War, during the conflict he lost his father, who was deported and subsequently died in an attempt to escape. In 1941, his younger brother also died of meningitis. Robazza lived on his wits for a period, in Trastevere, with his mother. Without qualifications, in 1952, he enlisted in the Italian Navy. He became a non- commissioned officer and an amateur boxer. In 1956, he returned home, where he painted his first portraits. He then left for Belgium, where he took courses in gemology.

Then in Rome, he created a bust of the footballer Luciano Re Cecconi, "Love and Solidarity" (consigned in 1979 to Sandro Pertini and the following year to Pope John Paul II ), a bronze bas -relief dedicated to Aldo Moro and his escort and a high relief in memory of agents Antonio Mea and Pierino Ollanu (killed near the Roman headquarters of the Christian Democrats).

His other works are the Christ for the Cathedral of Santa Maria Assunta in Altamura and portraits of Karol Wojtyła, Alcide De Gasperi, Franz Josef Strauß. He also created a bronze monument to Alfredo Rampi, and to the Thai ruling couple Sirikit and Bhumibol. For the victims of terrorism, he created the monument of the Madonna della Pace, in viale Mazzini in Rome, as well as the overseas war memorial for the Bari Shrine. He made the bronze of Judge Girolamo Tartaglione, and one in honor of the President of the United States Ronald Reagan (a work entrusted to the White House, located in the Roosevelt Room).

He created bas-reliefs of numerous Roman squares and works of religious inspiration. His is also the transposition in high relief of Dante Alighieri 's Inferno, 90 square meters of resin marble representing scenes from the 34 cantos of the first cantica of the Divine Comedy. Among his other sculptures are a marble horse donated to the village of Rocca Priora, where there is also a fountain by the artist. As well the Benedetto Robazza Museum in located in Rocco Priora.
