= Composition with Three Figures =

Painting by Fernand Léger

- Artist: Fernand Léger
- Year: 1932
- Medium: Oil on canvas
- Dimensions: 182 cm × 230 cm (72 in × 91 in)
- Location: Musée National d'Art Moderne; Paris

Composition with Three Figures is an oil on canvas painting by French painter Fernand Léger, from 1932. It is held at the Musée National d'Art Moderne, in Paris.

== Description ==
On a bright yellow background, the painting depicts three figures, on its left side, and a ladder and a rope, on its right side, all in tones of gray. A blue wavy shape stained with white separates these two parts. It is a composition made of simple geometric forms. The characters are disproportionate, with oval faces, large eyes and stylized hair.

The artist here chooses a large-format composition in which he divides the elements of the painting into two groups in order to affirm a “dialectical evolution which necessarily involves the always very concentrated oppositions of two antinomic and clearly formulated themes”.

Abandoning industrial and urban forms, but still strongly imbued with the aesthetics of these themes, Fernand Léger returns in this work to the human subject, but not as an object of plastic admiration: “If an object, a subject, is beautiful, it is no longer raw material, it is plastic value, therefore unusable; we just have to look and admire." The painting also seems to indicate a certain influence from surrealism.
