= Lois Mailou Jones =

American artist and educator (1905–1998)

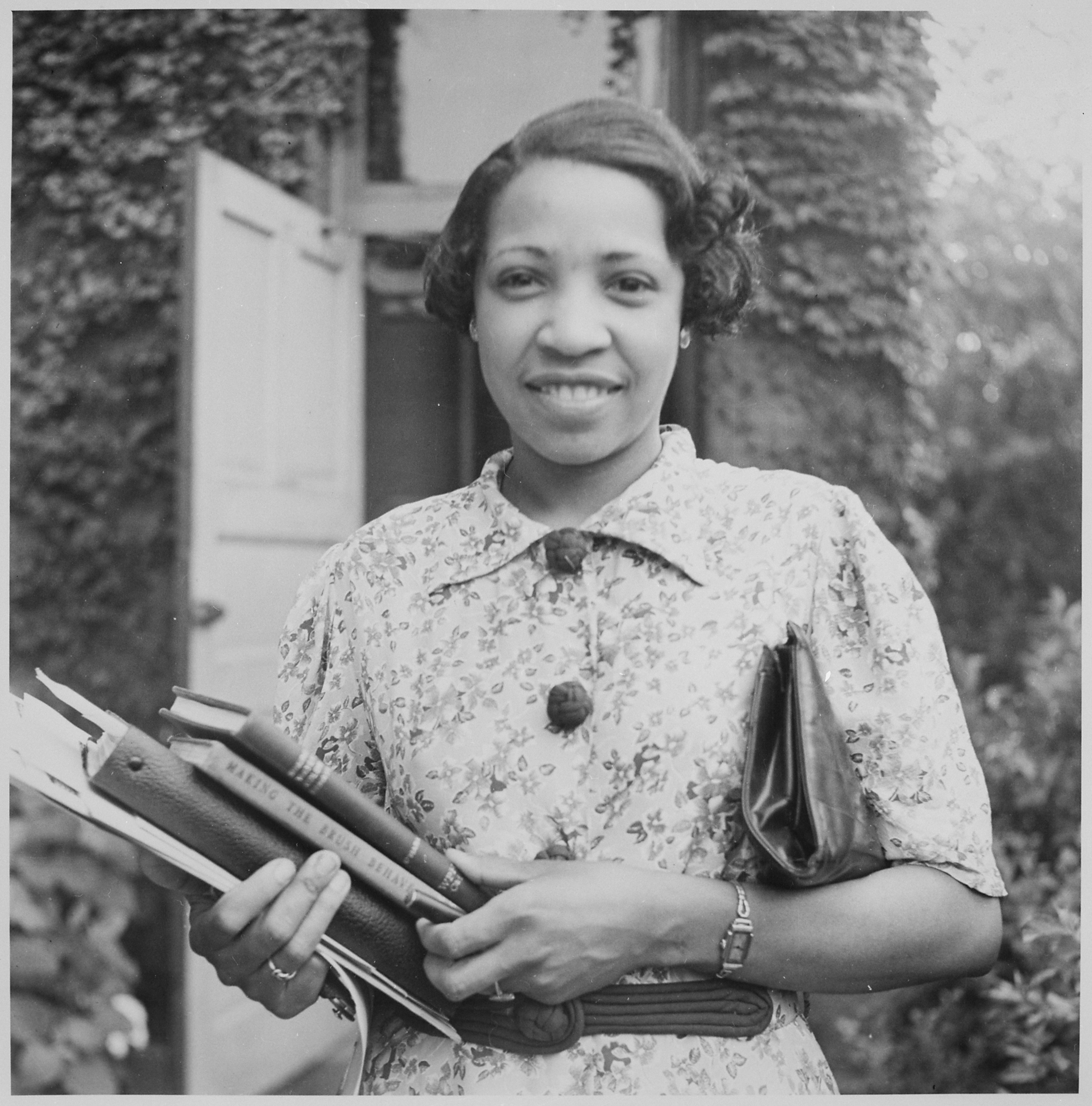
- Loïs Mailou Jones c. 1936
- Born: November 3, 1905; Boston, Massachusetts, U.S.
- Died: June 9, 1998 (aged 92); Washington, D.C., U.S.
- Education: School of the Museum of Fine Arts; Designers Art School; Howard University; Columbia University
- Occupations: Artist and educator
- Spouse: Louis Vergniaud Pierre-Noel (m. 1953)

Lois Mailou Jones (November 3. 1905 – June 9 1998) was an artist and educator. Her work can be found in the collections of the Smithsonian American Art Museum, The Metropolitan Museum of Art, the National Museum of Women in the Arts, the Brooklyn Museum, the Museum of Fine Arts, Boston, Muscarelle Museum of Art, and The Phillips Collection. Jones is often associated with the Harlem Renaissance.

== Early life and education ==
Jones was born in Boston, Massachusetts, to Thomas Vreeland Jones and Carolyn Adams. Her father was a building superintendent who later became a lawyer after becoming the first African-American to earn a law degree from Suffolk Law School. Her mother worked as a cosmetologist. Jones's parents encouraged her to draw and paint using watercolors during childhood. Her parents bought a house on Martha's Vineyard, where Jones met those who influenced her life and art, such as sculptor Meta Warrick Fuller, composer Harry T. Burleigh, and novelist Dorothy West.

From 1919 to 1923, Jones attended the High School of Practical Arts in Boston. During these years, Jones took night classes from the Boston Museum of Fine Arts through an annual scholarship. Additionally, Jones apprenticed in costume design with Grace Ripley. Jones held her first solo exhibition at the age of seventeen in Martha's Vineyard. Jones began experimenting with African mask influences at the Ripley Studio. From her research of African masks, Jones created costume designs for Denishawn.

From 1923 to 1927, Jones studied design at the School of the Museum of Fine Arts in Boston, where she won the Susan Minot Lane Scholarship in Design yearly. Jones took night courses at the Boston Normal Art School while working towards her degree. After graduating from the School of the Museum of Fine Arts, she received her graduate degree in design from the Designers Art School of Boston in 1928. Afterwards, Jones began working at the F. A. Foster Company in Boston and the Schumacher Company in New York City. During the summer of 1928, she attended Howard University, where she decided to focus on painting instead of design.

Jones continued taking classes throughout her lifetime. In 1934, she took classes on different cultural masks at Columbia University. In 1945, she received a BA degree in art education from Howard University, graduating magna cum laude.

== Career and life ==
Jones's career began in the 1930s and she continued producing artwork until she died in 1998 at 92. Her style shifted and evolved multiple times in response to influences in her life, especially her extensive travels. She worked with different mediums, techniques, and influences throughout her career. Her extensive travels throughout Europe, Africa, and the Caribbean influenced and changed how Jones painted. She felt that her most significant contribution to the art world was "proof of the talent of black artists". Jones wished to be known as an American painter with no labels. Her work echoes her pride in her African roots and American ancestry.

=== 1928–1936 ===
Jones' teaching career began shortly after finishing college. The director of the Boston Museum School refused to hire her, telling her to find a job in the Southern United States where "her people" lived. In 1928, Jones was hired by Charlotte Hawkins Brown after some initial reservations, and subsequently founded the art department at Palmer Memorial Institute, a historically black prep school, in Sedalia, North Carolina. As a prep school teacher, Jones coached a basketball team, taught folk dancing, and played the piano for church services. In 1930, Jones was recruited by James Vernon Herring to join the art department at Howard University in Washington, D.C., Jones remained as professor of design and watercolor painting until her retirement in 1977. Jones worked to prepare her students for a competitive career in the arts by inviting working designers and artists into her classroom for workshops. While developing her work as an artist, Jones became an outstanding mentor and strong advocate for African-American art and artists.

In the early 1930s, Jones began to seek recognition for her designs and artwork. She began to exhibit her works with the William E. Harmon Foundation with a charcoal drawing of a student at the Palmer Memorial Institute, Negro Youth (1929). In this period, Jones shifted away from design and began experimenting with portraiture.

Jones developed as an artist through visits and summers spent in Harlem during the onset of the Harlem Renaissance or New Negro Movement. Aaron Douglas, a Harlem Renaissance artist, influenced her seminal art piece The Ascent of Ethiopia. African design elements can be seen in the paintings of both Douglas and Jones. Jones studied actual objects and design elements from Africa.

In her works Negro Youth and Ascent of Ethiopia, the influence of African masks are evident in the profiles of the faces. The chiseled structures and shading renderings mimic three-dimensional masks that Jones studied. Jones would utilize this style throughout her career.

During this period, Jones occasionally collaborated with poet Gertrude P. McBrown; for example, McBrown's poem "Fire-Flies" appears with an illustration by Jones in the April 1929 issue of the Saturday Evening Quill. She became a key illustrator for The Associated Publishers – founded in 1921 by Carter G. Woodson – illustrating McBrown's Picture-Poetry Book (1935) and many pieces in The Negro History Bulletin (starting in 1937).

=== 1937–1953 ===
In 1937, Jones received a fellowship to study in Paris at the Académie Julian. She produced more than 30 watercolors during her year in France. In total, Jones completed approximately 40 paintings during her time at the Académie, utilizing the en plein air method of painting that she used throughout her career. Two paintings were accepted at the annual Salon de Printemps exhibition at the Société des Artistes Français for her Parisian debut. Jones loved her time in Paris as she felt entirely accepted in society as opposed to the United States at this time. The French were appreciative of paintings and talent. After being granted an extension of her fellowship to travel to Italy, Jones returned to Howard University and taught watercolor painting classes.

She was the most prominent black children's illustrator of the mid-century, illustrating many children's books through Woodson's Associated Publishers during this period, including Jane Dabney Shackelford's The Child’s Story of the Negro (1938), Helen Adele Whiting's Negro Art, Music, and Rhyme (1938) and Negro Folk Tales (1938), Carter G. Woodson's African Heroes and Heroines (1939), Effie Lee Newsome's Gladiola Garden (1940), and Derricotte, Turner, and Roy's Word Pictures of the Great (1941), as well as Marel Brown's Lilly May and Dan: Two Children of the South (1946) through the Home Mission Board of the Southern Baptist Convention.

In 1938, Jones produced Les Fétiches (1938), an African-inspired oil painting that is owned by the Smithsonian American Art Museum. Jones painted Les Fétiches in a Post-Cubist and Post-Primitive style. Five African masks swirl around the dark canvas. Jones could view and study many different African objects and masks at the Musée de l'Homme and galleries through her fellowship in Paris. In Les Fétiches, masks from Songye Kifwebe and Guru Dan are visible.

In 1941, Jones entered her painting Indian Shops Gay Head, Massachusetts into the Corcoran Gallery of Art's annual competition. At the time, the Corcoran Gallery prohibited African-American artists from entering their artworks. Jones had Tabary enter her painting to circumvent the rule. Jones won the Robert Woods Bliss Award for this work of art, yet she could not pick up the award herself. Tabary had to mail the award to Jones. Despite these issues, Jones worked harder notwithstanding the racial biases found throughout the country at this time. In 1994, the Corcoran Gallery of Art gave a public apology to Jones at the opening of the exhibition The World of Lois Mailou Jones, 50 years after Jones hid her identity.

Jones' Les Fétiches was instrumental in transitioning "Négritude" — a distinctly francophone artistic phenomenon — from the predominantly literary realm into the visual. Her work provided an important visual link to Négritude authors such as Aimé Césaire, Léon Damas, and Léopold Sédar Senghor. Jones also completed Parisian Beggar Woman with text supplied by Langston Hughes. In 1938, the first solo exhibition by Jones was hung in the Whyte Gallery and would later be exhibited at the Howard University Gallery of Art in 1948.

The Lovers (Somali Friends) (1950) at the National Gallery of Art in 2022

Jones painted "Arreau, Hautes-Pyrenees" in France during one of her many trips there between the years of 1945 and 1953, when she shared a summer studio with Celine Marie Tabary in Cabris, France While in France a part of her inspiration was Tabary, also a painter, whom Jones worked with for many years. Tabary submitted Jones' paintings for consideration for jury prizes since works by African-American artists were not always accepted. Jones traveled extensively with Tabary, including to the south of France. They frequently painted each other. They taught art together in the 1940s. Arreau, Hautes-Pyrenees which is an oil on canvas landscape that stars a hillside in the South of France. The French influence and post-impressionist influences are highlighted as Jones employees use rich oranges, yellows, and tans, complemented with clean blues and delicate greens while remaining in a tonally warm palette. The geometric houses echo an asymmetric composition that echoes the post-impressionist influences on Jones at the time. This influence can be recognized through her landscape and documentary portraits of people and landscapes in France and America between the years of 1948–1953.

Over the next 10 years, Jones exhibited at the Phillips Collection, Seattle Art Museum, National Academy of Design, the Barnett-Aden Gallery, Pennsylvania's Lincoln University, Howard University, galleries in New York, and the Corcoran Gallery of Art. In 1952, the book Loïs Mailou Jones: Peintures 1937–1951 was published, reproducing more than one hundred of her art pieces completed in France. At the Barnett-Aden Gallery, Jones exhibited with a group of prominent black artists, such as Jacob Lawrence and Alma Thomas. These artists and others were known as the "Little Paris Group."

Alain Locke, a philosophy professor at Howard University and founder of the Harlem Renaissance, encouraged Jones to paint her heritage. Jones painted her striking painting Mob Victim (Meditation) after walking along U St Northwest in the District of Columbia. Jones saw a man walking and asked him to pose in her studio. Jones wanted to depict a lynching scene. The man had seen a person being lynched before and mimicked the pose that the man held before being lynched. The painting illustrates a contemplation of imminent death that many male African Americans were facing during the 1940s. Other paintings that came out of Locke's encouragement were Dans un Café à Paris (Leigh Whipper), The Janitor and The Pink Table Cloth.

Previously in 1934, Jones met Louis Vergniaud Pierre-Noel, a prominent Haitian artist, while both were students at Columbia University. They corresponded for almost 20 years before marrying in southern France in 1953. Jones and her husband lived in Washington, D.C., and Haiti. Their frequent trips to Haiti inspired and impacted Jones' art style significantly.

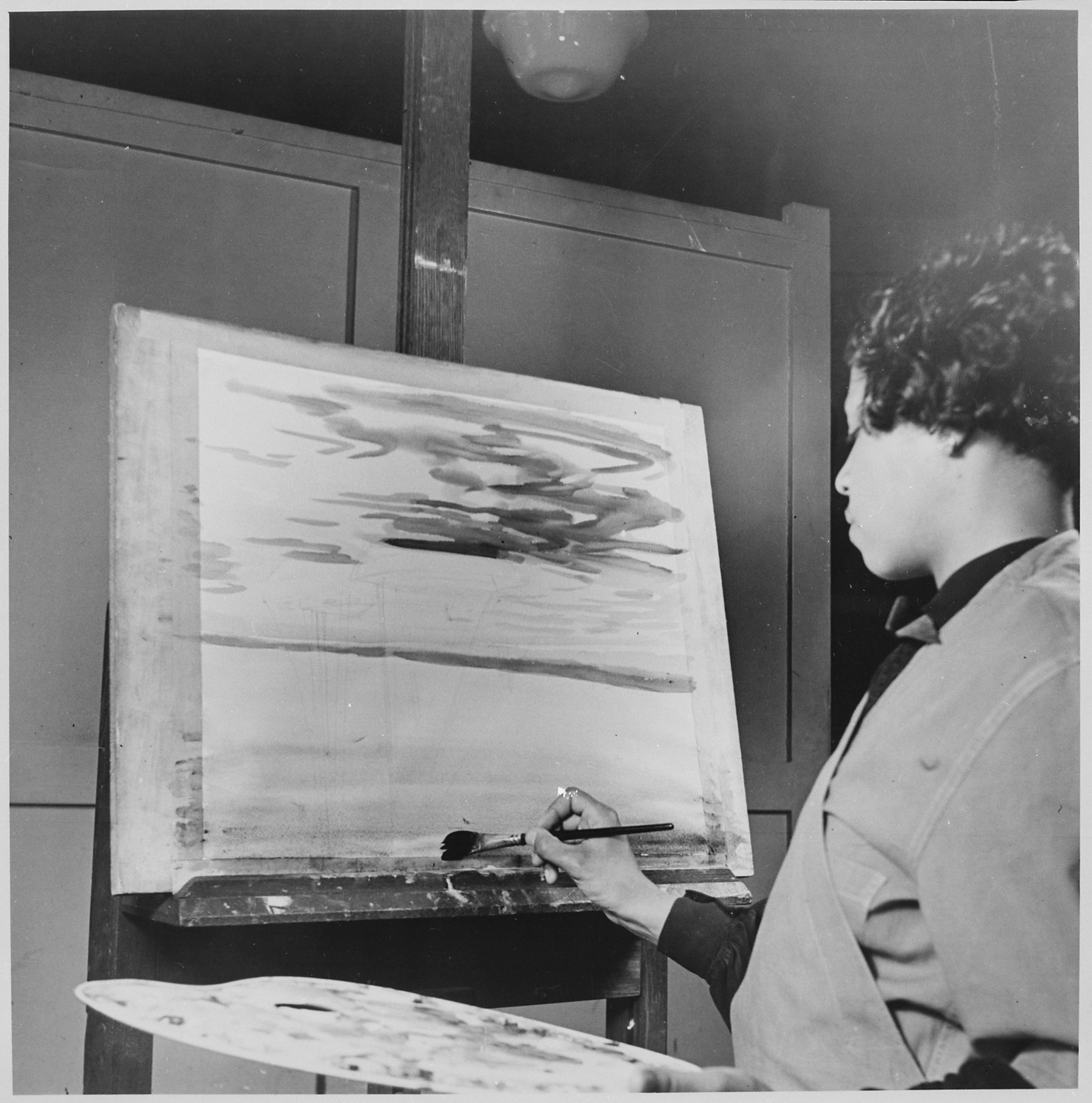
Lois Jones, artist at work

=== 1954–1967 ===
In 1954, Jones was a guest professor at Centre D'Art and Foyer des Arts Plastiques in Port-au-Prince, Haiti, where the government invited her to paint Haitian people and landscapes. Her work became energized by the bright colors. Jones and her husband returned there during summers for the next several years, in addition to frequent trips to France. Jones completed 42 paintings and exhibited them in her show Oeuvres des Loïs Mailou Jones Pierre-Noël, which was sponsored by the First Lady of Haiti. As a result of her paintings, Jones was awarded the Diplôme et Décoration de l'Ordre National "Honneur et Mérite au Grade de Chevalier." In 1955, Jones unveiled portraits of the Haitian president and his wife commissioned by United States President Dwight D. Eisenhower.

Jones's numerous oils and watercolors inspired by Haiti are probably her most widely known works. Her affinity for bright colors, her understanding of Cubism's basic principles, and her search for a distinct style reached an apogee in them. In many of her pieces, one can see the influence of the Haitian culture, with its African influences reinvigorating how Jones viewed the world. These include Ode to Kinshasa and Ubi Girl from Tai Region. Her work became more abstract, vibrant, and thematically after moving to Haiti. Her previously impressionist techniques gave way to a spirited, richly patterned, and brilliantly colored style.

In the 1960s, Jones exhibited at School of the Museum of Fine Arts, Boston, Cornell University, and galleries in France, New York, and the District of Columbia. In 1962, Jones initiated Howard University's first art student tour of France, including study at Académie de la Grande Chaumière and guided several more tours over the years.

=== 1968–1988 ===
In 1968, Jones documented work and interviews of contemporary Haitian artists for Howard University's "The Black Visual Arts" research grant.

Jones received the same grant in 1970 as well. Between 1968 and 1970, Jones traveled to 11 African countries, which influenced her painting style. She documented and interviewed contemporary African artists in Ethiopia, Sudan, Kenya, Zaire (now known as the Democratic Republic of the Congo), Nigeria, Dahomey (today known as Benin), Ghana, Ivory Coast, Liberia, Sierra Leone, and Senegal. Her report Contemporary African Art was published in 1970. In 1971, Jones delivered 1000 slides and other materials to the university to fulfil the project.

On May 22, 1970, Jones took part in a national day of protest in Washington, D.C., that was created by Robert Morris in New York. They protested against racism and the Vietnam War. While many Washington, D.C., artists did not paint to be political or create their commentary on racial issues, Jones was greatly influenced by Africa and the Caribbean, which her art reflected. For example, her Moon Masque is thought to represent then-contemporary problems in Africa.

In 1973, Jones received the "Women artists of the Caribbean and Afro-American Artists" grant from Howard University. In the same year, Jones was awarded an honorary Doctor of Philosophy from Colorado State Christian College.

Her research inspired Jones to synthesize a body of designs and motifs that she combined in large, complex compositions. Jones's return to African themes in her work of the past several decades coincided with the black expressionistic movement in the United States during the 1960s. Skillfully integrating aspects of African masks, figures, and textiles into her vibrant paintings, Jones became a link between the Harlem Renaissance movement and a contemporary expression of similar themes.

On July 29, 1984, Lois Jones Day was declared in Washington, DC.

=== 1989–1998 ===
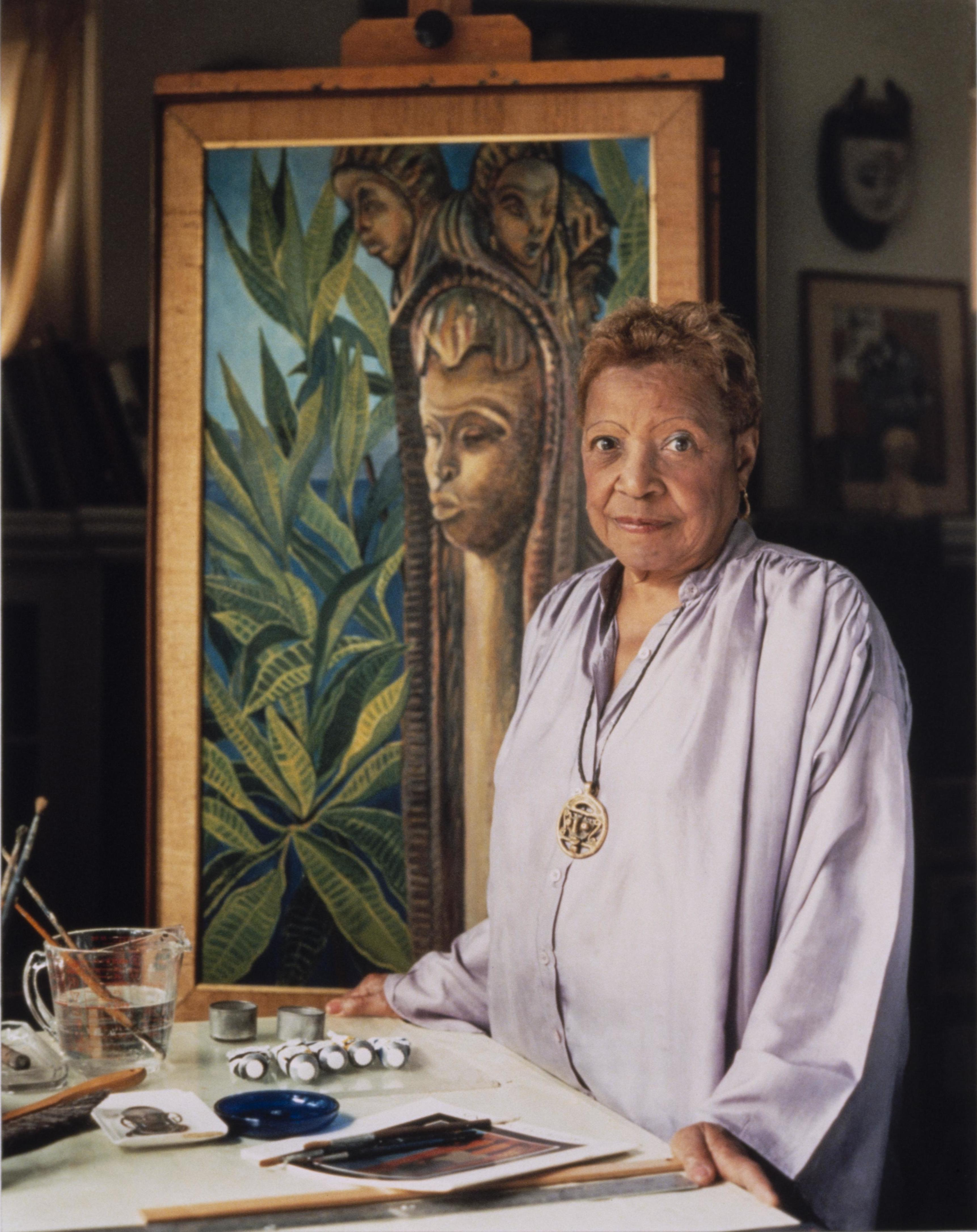
Jones in her studio, c. 1977

Jones continued to produce exciting new works at an astonishing speed. Jones traveled to France and experimented with her previous Impressionist-Post-impressionist style, which started her career in Paris. Her landscapes were painted with a broader color palette from her Haitian and African influences.

On her 84th birthday, Jones had a major heart attack and subsequently a triple bypass.

The Meridian International Center created a retrospective exhibition with the help of Jones herself. 1990 exhibition toured across the country for several years. The exhibition was the first exhibition of Jones that garnered her nationwide attention. Despite her extensive portfolio, teaching career, and cultural work in other countries, Jones had been left out of the history books because she did not stick to typical subjects suitable for African Americans to paint.

Bill Clinton and Hillary Clinton collected one of her island seascapes, Breezy Day at Gay Head, while they were in the White House.

In 1991, The National Museum of Women in the Arts held an exhibition that showcased some of Jones' children's book illustrations.

In 1994, The Corcoran Gallery of Art opened The World of Lois Mailou Jones exhibition publicly apologizing for their past racial discrimination.

In 1997, Jones's paintings were featured in an exhibition entitled Explorations in the City of Light: African-American Artists in Paris 1945–1965 that was mounted at several museums throughout the country, including the New Orleans Museum of Art, the Milwaukee Art Museum, and the Studio Museum of Harlem. The exhibition also featured the works of Barbara Chase-Riboud, Edward Clark, Harold B. Cousins, Beauford Delaney, Herbert Gentry, and Larry Potter. The exhibition examined the importance of Paris as an artistic mecca for African-American artists during the 20 years that followed World War II.

In 1998, Jones died with no immediate survivors at the age of 92 at her home in Washington, DC. Jones is buried on Martha's Vineyard in the Oak Bluffs Cemetery. Howard University hosted the exhibition Remembering Lois.

== Legacy ==
Lois Mailou Jones' work is in museums worldwide and valued by collectors. Her paintings grace the permanent collections of the Metropolitan Museum of Art, Smithsonian American Art Museum, Hirshhorn Museum and Sculpture Garden, National Portrait Gallery, Boston Museum of Fine Arts, the National Palace in Haiti, the National Center of Afro-American Artists, among others.

After her death, her friend and adviser Dr. Chris Chapman completed a book entitled Lois Mailou Jones: A Life in Color about her life and the African-American pioneers with whom she had worked with and been friends, including Dr. Carter G. Woodson, Alain Locke, Dorothy West, Josephine Baker, and Matthew Henson.

The Lois Mailou Jones Pierre-Noel Trust founded a scholarship in her name at the Museum of Fine Arts, Boston, and a scholarship fund for the Department of Fine Arts at Howard University.

In 2003, the Metropolitan Museum of Art exhibited African-American Artists, 1929–1945: Prints, Drawings, and Paintings in The Metropolitan Museum of Art, which included works by Jones.

In 2006, Lois Mailou Jones: The Early Works: Paintings and Patterns 1927–1937 opened at the School of the Museum of Fine Arts, Boston. The exhibition showed 30 designs and paintings from the beginning of her career.

From November 14, 2009, to February 29, 2010, a retrospective exhibit of her work entitled Lois Mailou Jones: A Life in Vibrant Color was held at the Mint Museum of Art in Charlotte, North Carolina. The traveling exhibit (including the National Museum of Women in the Arts) included 70 paintings showcasing her various styles and experiences: America, France, Haiti, and Africa.

Jones is featured in the 2017 publication, Identity Unknown: Rediscovering Seven American Women Artists. Jones was included in the 2018 Columbus Museum of Art exhibition and catalogue of I too sing America: the Harlem Renaissance at 100.

Pupils of Jones included Georgia Mills Jessup, Martha Jackson Jarvis, and David Driskell.

== Awards and honors ==
- Robert Woods Bliss Award for Landscape for Indian Shops Gay Head, Massachusetts (1941)
- Atlanta University award for watercolor painting Old House Near Frederick, Virginia (1942)
- Woman of 1946 award from the National Council of Negro Women (1946)
- John Hope Prize for Landscape for Ville d'Houdain, Pas-de-Calais and award from the Corcoran Gallery of Art for Petite Ville en hautes-Pyrenées (1949)
- Atlanta University award for Impasse de l'Oratorie, Grasse, France (1952)
- Oil painting award from the Corcoran Gallery of Art Coin de la Place Maubert, Paris (1953)
- Chevalier of the National Order of Honor and Merit from the government of Haiti. (1954)
- Award for design of publication Voici Hätii (1958)
- Atlanta University award for Voodoo Worshippers, Haiti and America's National Museum of Art award for Fishing Smacks, Menemsha, Massachusetts (1960)
- Elected person of The Royal Society of Arts in London. Received the Franz Bader Award for Oil Painting from National Museum of Art for Peasants on Parade (1962)
- Honorary Doctor of Philosophy from Colorado State University (1973)
- Howard University Fine Arts Faculty Award for Excellence in Teaching (1975)
- Honored by President Ronald Reagan at the White House for outstanding achievements in the arts (1980).
- Honorary Doctorate of Humane Letters from Suffolk University in Boston (1981)
- Candace Award, Arts and Letters, National Coalition of 100 Black Women (1982)
- 3rd Annual Art Awards, Washington, DC (1983)
- Lois Jones Day, Washington, DC (July 29, 1987)
- Outstanding Achievement Award in the Visual Arts, Women's Caucus of Art, Cooper Union, New York, NY (1986)
- Honorary Doctorate in Fine Arts from Massachusetts College of Art, Boston (1986)
- Honorary Doctorate of Humane Letters from Howard University (1987)
- Honorary Doctor of Humane Letters from The Atlanta College of Art (1989)
- Honorary Doctor of Fine Arts from the Corcoran School of Art (1996)

== Selected collections ==
- Men Working, not dated, Smithsonian American Art Museum, Washington, DC
- Negro Youth, 1929, Smithsonian American Art Museum, Washington, DC
- Brother Brown, 1931, Smithsonian American Art Museum, Washington, DC
- Les Fétiches, 1938, Smithsonian American Art Museum, Washington, DC
- Place du Tertre, 1938, The Phillips Collection, Washington, DC
- Dans un Café à Paris (Leigh Whipper), 1939, Brooklyn Museum, Brooklyn, NY
- Seated Man in Yellow Overalls, 1939, Smithsonian American art Museum, Washington, DC
- Cauliflower and Pumpkin, 1938, The Metropolitan Museum of Art, New York, NY
- Self-Portrait, 1940, Smithsonian American Art Museum, Washington, DC
- Les Clochards, Montmartre, Paris, 1947, Smithsonian American Art Museum, Washington, DC
- Coin de la Rue Medard, 1947, The Phillips Collection, Washington, DC
- Jardin du Luxembourg, ca. 1948, Smithsonian American Art Museum, Washington, DC
- Arreau, Hautes-Pyrénées, 1949, National Museum of Women in the Arts, Washington, DC
- Mme. Feugeront à Cabris, AM, 1950, Muscarelle Museum of Art, Williamsburg, VA
- Jeune Fille Française, 1951, Smithsonian American Art Museum, Washington, DC
- Eglise Saint Joseph, 1954, Smithsonian American Art Museum, Washington, DC
- Shapes and Colors, 1958, Smithsonian American Art Museum, Washington, DC
- Challenge—America, 1964, Hirshhorn Museum and Sculpture Garden, Washington, DC
- Moon Masque, 1971, Smithsonian American Art Museum, Washington, DC
- Ode to Kinshasa, 1972, National Museum of Women in the Arts, Washington, DC
- Ubi Girl from Tai Region, 1972, Museum of Fine Arts, Boston, Boston, MA
- La Baker, 1977, Museum of Fine Arts, Boston, Boston, MA
- The Green Door, 1981, National Gallery of Art, Washington, DC
- Suriname, 1982, Smithsonian American Art Museum, Washington, DC
- Glyphs, 1985, Museum of Fine Arts, Boston, Boston, MA
- Untitled (Portrait of Léopold Sédar Senghor), 1996, Minneapolis Institute of Art, Minneapolis, MN

== Selected exhibitions ==
- Solo exhibition, 1937, Howard University, Washington, D.C., sponsored by Alpha Kappa Alpha sorority.
- Solo exhibition, 1946, Barnett Aden Gallery, Washington, DC
- Solo exhibition, 1947, Lincoln University of the Commonwealth of Pennsylvania
- Solo exhibition, 1948, Whyte Gallery and Howard University, Washington, DC
- Solo exhibition, 1955, Pan American Union Building, Washington, DC
- Solo exhibition, 1961, Galerie International, New York, NY
- Solo exhibition, 1966, Galerie Soulanges, Paris, France
- Solo exhibition, 1967, Cornell University, Ithaca, NY
- Forty Years of Painting, 1972, Howard University Gallery of Art, Washington, DC
- Reflective Moments, 1973–1974, MFA, Boston, MA
- Six Distinguished Women Artists, 1976, Brooklyn Museum, New York, NY
- Solo exhibition, 1979, The Phillips Collection, Washington, DC
- The World of Loïs Mailou Jones, 1990–1996, The Meridian International Center, Toured throughout the nation
- The Art of Loïs Mailou Jones, 1991–1993, Bomani Art Gallery, San Francisco, CA
- The Life and Art of Lois Mailou Jones, 1994, Corcoran Gallery of Art, Washington, DC
- Loïs Mailou Jones: The Early Works: Paintings and Patterns 1927–1937, 2006, School of the Museum of Fine Arts, Boston, MA
- Lois Mailou Jones: A Life in Vibrant Color, 2009–2010, Mint Museum of Art, Charlotte, NC
- Full Spectrum: The Prolific Master within Loïs Mailou Jones, 2014–2015, DC Commission on the Arts and Humanities in Partnership with the Loïs Mailou Jones Trust, The I Street Gallery, Washington, DC
- The Life and Work of Lois Mailou Jones, 2015, Martha's Vineyard Museum, Edgartown, MA
