= Monique Vinh Thuy =

French-born Vietnamese princess (1946–2021)

Monique Baudot
- Born: Monique Baudot; 30 April 1946; France
- Died: 27 September 2021 (aged 75); Paris, France
- Spouse: Bảo Đại (m. 1972; died 1997)
Names
- Monique Vinh Thuy
- Dynasty: Nguyễn Phúc (by marriage)

Monique Vinh Thuy (born Monique Baudot, 30 April 1946 – 27 September 2021) was the wife of the last Emperor of Vietnam, Bảo Đại.

== Biography ==
The former Vietnamese monarch abdicated in 1945, a year later went to live overseas, returned to Vietnam in 1949 as Head of State of Vietnam, but was overthrown by his Prime Minister Ngo Dinh Diem in 1955. He lived in exile in France thereafter.

The former emperor and Baudot began living together in Paris around 1971. They married in 1972.

After the death of her husband in 1997, Baudot self-styled herself as Her Very Gracious Majesty Empress Thái Phương.

She died on 27 September 2021 at the age of 75. Her funeral was held on 14 October 2021 at the Chapel Sainte-Bernadette d'Auteuil in Paris.
