= Patrick-Édouard Bloch-Carcenac =

Youngest son of Bảo Đại (b. 1958)

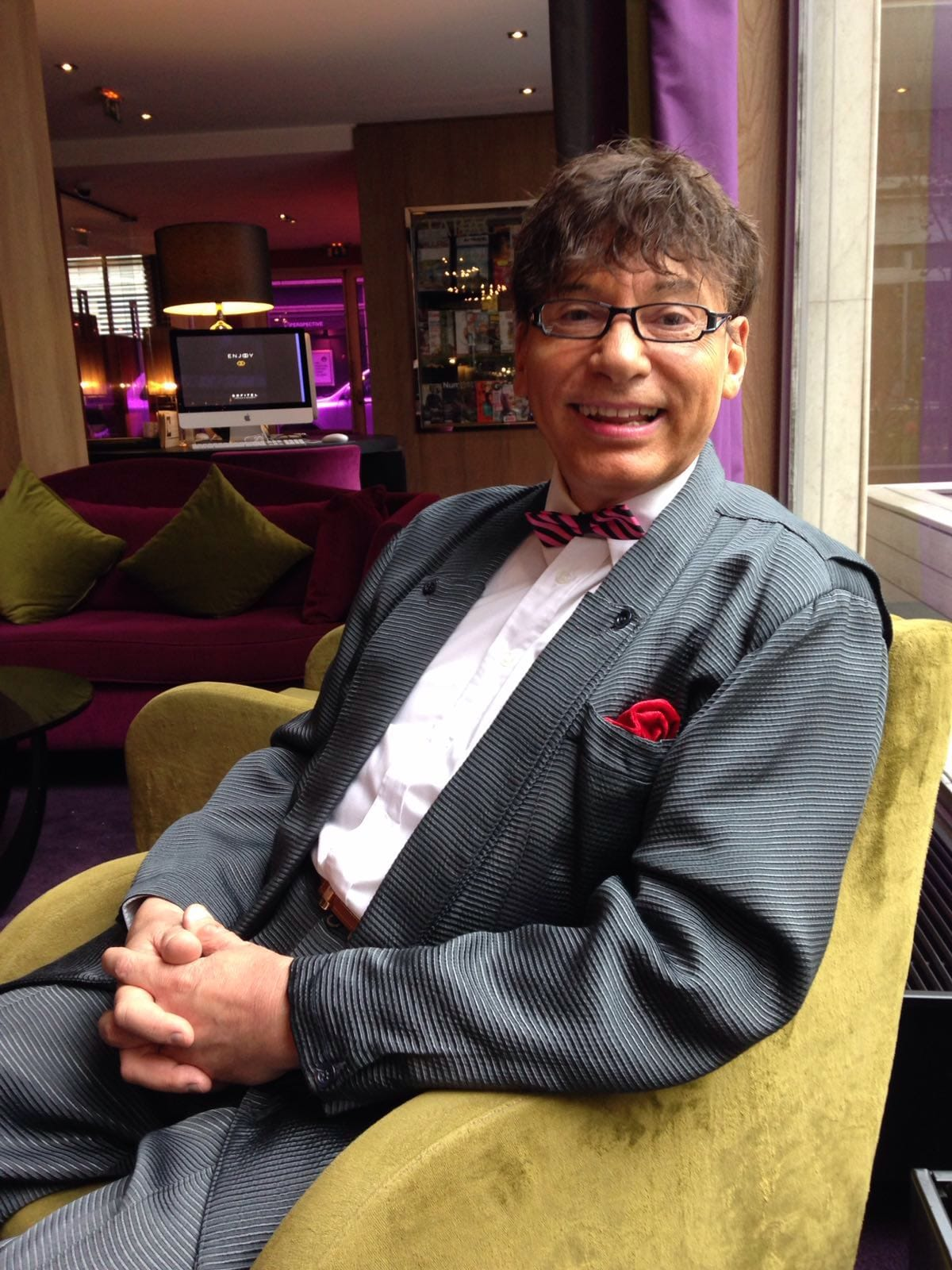
- Bloch in 2021
- Born: 21 April 1958 (age 68); Strasbourg, France
- Spouse: Claudine Lang (m. 1992; div. 2000)
Names
- Patrick-Édouard Bloch-Carcenac; Vietnamese: Patrick-Édouard Nguyễn Phúc
- House: House of Nguyễn Phúc
- Dynasty: Nguyễn dynasty
- Father: Bảo Đại
- Mother: Christiane Bloch-Carcenac

Patrick-Édouard Bloch-Carcenac (born 21 April 1958 in Strasbourg, France), also known as Patrick-Édouard Nguyễn Phúc, is a Vietnamese-French former businessman. He is the thirteenth and youngest son of Emperor Bảo Đại, the last emperor of the Nguyễn dynasty. He is a member of the House of Nguyễn Phúc.

== Biography ==
Patrick-Édouard Bloch-Carcenac was born on 21 April 1958 in Strasbourg, France, to Bảo Đại and Christiane Bloch-Carcenac. Patrick-Édouard's parents first met in Alsace in 1957, when Bảo Đại arrived there by the invitation of Jean de Beaumont.

In 1980, as Bảo Đại wanted to officially ordain Patrick-Édouard as prince, he declined the title, stating that it's "unnecessary".
