= Bảo Đại =

Last emperor of Vietnam from 1926 to 1945 (1913–1997)

- Emperor Of Vietnam
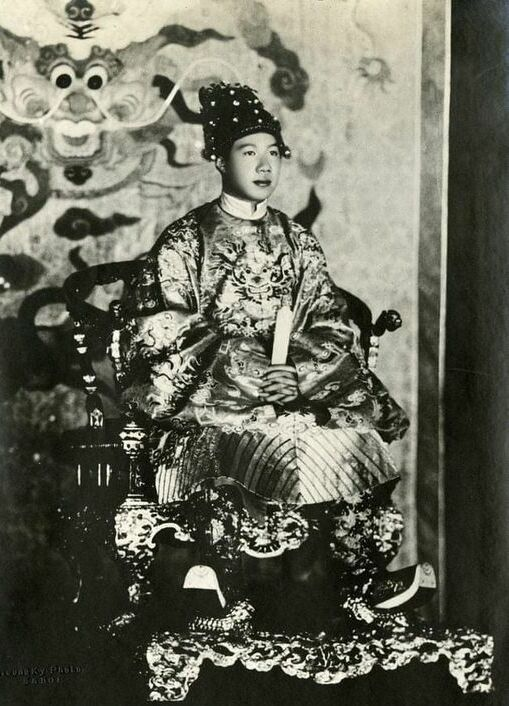
- Bảo Đại on throne in Thái Hòa throne hall

Emperor of Đại Nam and of the Empire of Vietnam
- Reign: 8 Jan 1926 – 25 Aug 1945
- Predecessor: Khải Định
- Successor: Monarchy abolished (Hồ Chí Minh as president)

Chief of State of Vietnam
- Reign: 14 June 1949 – 26 Oct 1955
- Predecessor: Position established
- Successor: Position abolished (Ngô Đình Diệm as president)

1st Prime Minister of the State of Vietnam
- Reign: 1 July 1949 – 21 Jan 1950
- Predecessor: Nguyễn Văn Xuân as head of the Provisional Central Government
- Successor: Nguyễn Phan Long

Supreme Advisor to the Government of the Democratic Republic of Vietnam
- Reign: 10 Sep 1945 – 18 Mar 1946
- Serving with: Thaddeus Lê Hữu Từ
- Born: Nguyễn Phúc Vĩnh Thụy (阮福永瑞); 22 October 1913; Doan-Trang-Vien Palace, Annam, French Indochina
- Died: 31 July 1997 (aged 83); Val-de-Grâce, Paris, France
- Burial: Passy Cemetery
- Spouse: Nam Phương (m. 1934–1963): Bùi Mộng Điệp; Lê Thị Phi Ánh; Christiane Bloch-Carcenac; Monique Baudot (m. 1972–1997)
- Issue: Legitimate; Bảo Long (1936–2007); Phương Mai (1937–2021); Phương Liên (1939–); Phương Dung (1942–); Bảo Thăng (1943–2017); Unrecognized; Phương Thảo (1946–); Phương Minh (1949–2012); Bảo Ân (1951–); Bảo Hoàng (1954–1955); Bảo Sơn (1957–1987); Phương Từ (1955); Declined; Patrick-Édouard Bloch-Carcenac (1958–)
Era dates
- Bảo Đại (保大) (1926–1945)
- House: Nguyễn Phúc
- Father: Khải Định
- Mother: Từ Cung
- Religion: Confucianism; Catholicism (from 1988)

Bảo Đại (Vietnamese: [ɓâw ɗâjˀ], chữ Hán: 保大, lit. "keeper of greatness", 22 October 1913 – 31 July 1997), born Nguyễn Phúc Vĩnh Thụy ( chữ Hán: 阮福永瑞), was the 13th and final emperor of the Nguyễn dynasty, the last ruling dynasty of Vietnam. From 1926 to 1945, he was de jure emperor of Đại Nam, which consisted of the French protectorates of Annam and Tonkin within French Indochina, covering the present-day central and northern Vietnam. Bảo Đại ascended the throne in 1932.

The Japanese ousted the Vichy French administration in March 1945 and kept Bảo Đại as emperor, under whose authority the Empire of Vietnam was proclaimed. He abdicated in August 1945 after Japan surrendered.

From 1949 to 1955, Bảo Đại was the chief of state of the French-associated, anti-communist State of Vietnam. He was criticized for being too closely associated with France and spending much of his time outside Vietnam. He was eventually ousted in a referendum in 1955 by Prime Minister Ngô Đình Diệm, who was later supported by the United States.

== Early life ==
Bảo Đại was born as Nguyễn Phúc Vĩnh Thụy ( 阮福永瑞) on 22 October 1913 with the childhood name Mệ Vững. He was the only child of Emperor Khải Định and his concubine Hoàng Thị Cúc. At that time, Vietnam had been ruled by the Nguyễn dynasty since 1802. Then, the French colonial government completely conquered the country in 1883 and split Vietnam into three areas: the protectorates of Annam and Tonkin and the colony of Cochinchina, all of which would later be parts of Federation of Indochina. The Nguyễn dynasty was given nominal rule of Annam and Tonkin.

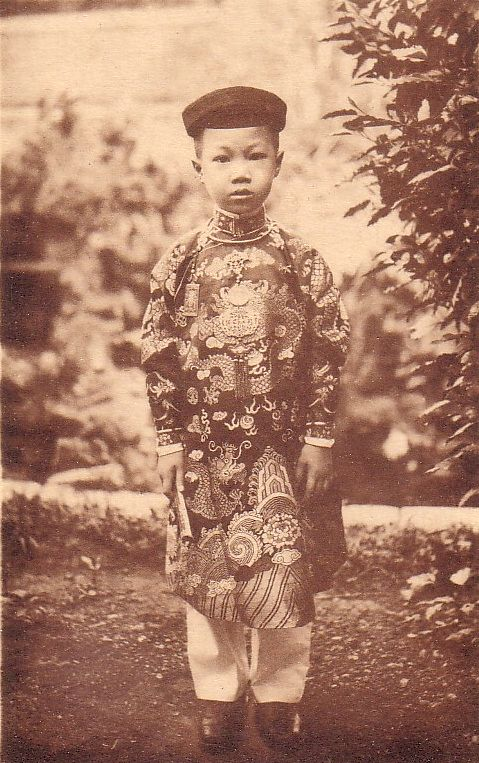
Crown Prince Vĩnh Thụy in 1920

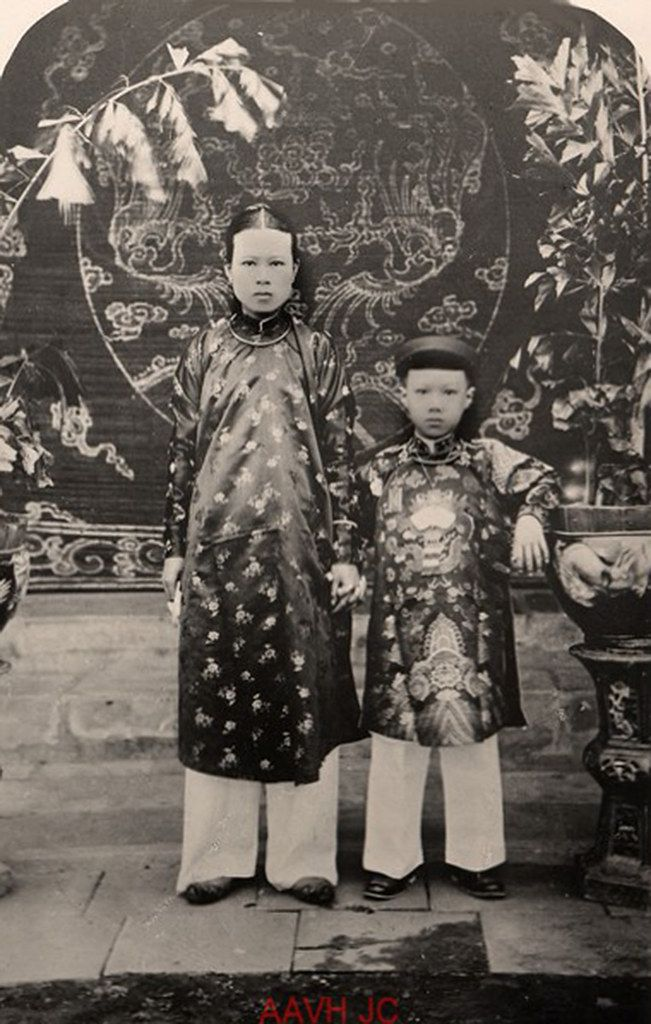
Bảo Đại and his mother

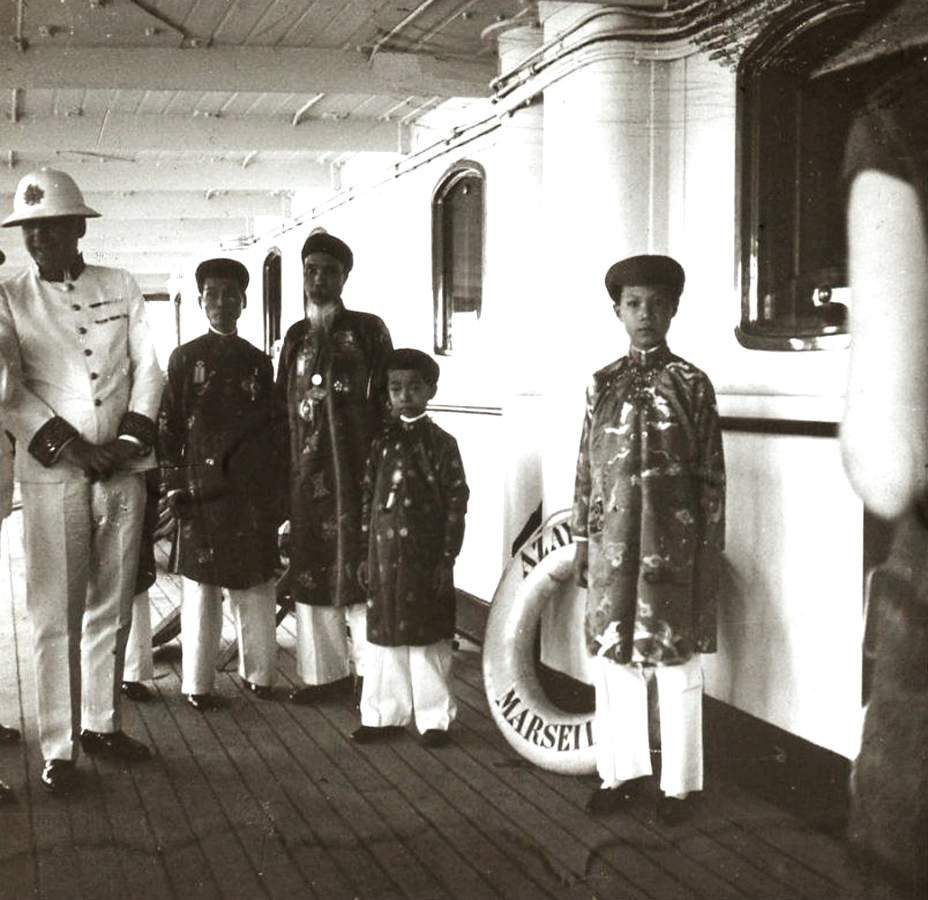
Young crown prince Vĩnh Thụy (right) boarding the Azay-le-Rideau steamer bound for Marseille to attend colonial exhibition in France, 1922

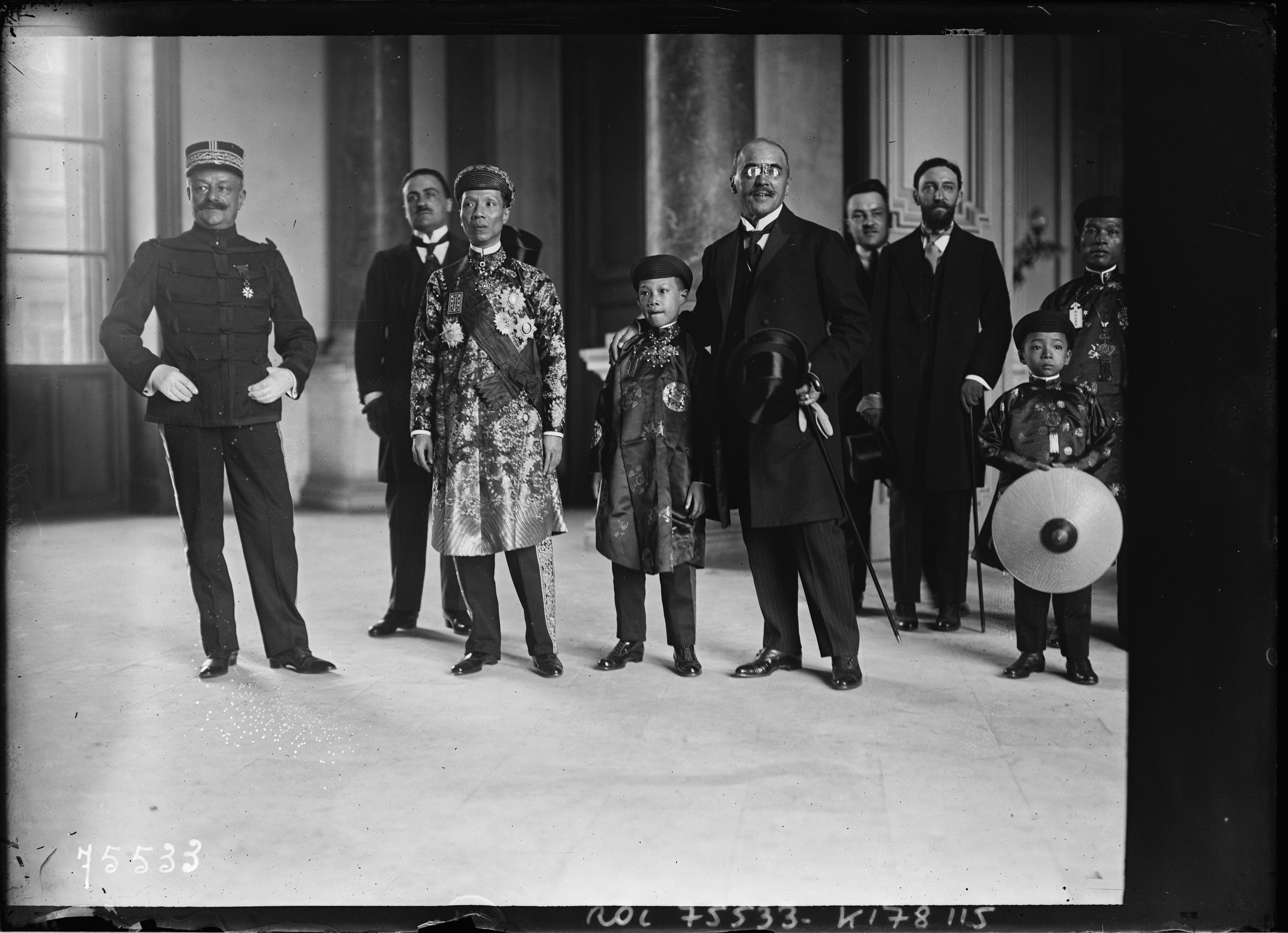
Emperor Khải Định, Prince Vĩnh Thụy (middle) and Albert Sarrault in Marseille, 1922

On 28 April 1922, at the age of 9, he was invested as Crown Prince of East Palace (Đông Cung Hoàng Thái Tử, 東宮皇太子). On June 15, 1922, he and his father led the delegation to France to participate in a colonial exhibition (Exposition nationale coloniale) in Marseille. This was the first time he went to an overseas trip to Western Europe.

== Education in France ==
In June 1922, Prince Vĩnh Thụy was adopted by the former Resident-Superior of Annam, Jean François Eugène Charles and his wife. They then sent him to France to study at the Lycée Condorcet. In February 1924, he returned to Vietnam to attend the 40th birthday anniversary of his father, before returning to France to continue his studies at Hattemer School in November. He was the first Vietnamese monarch to receive a full Western education, which would shape his future reign.

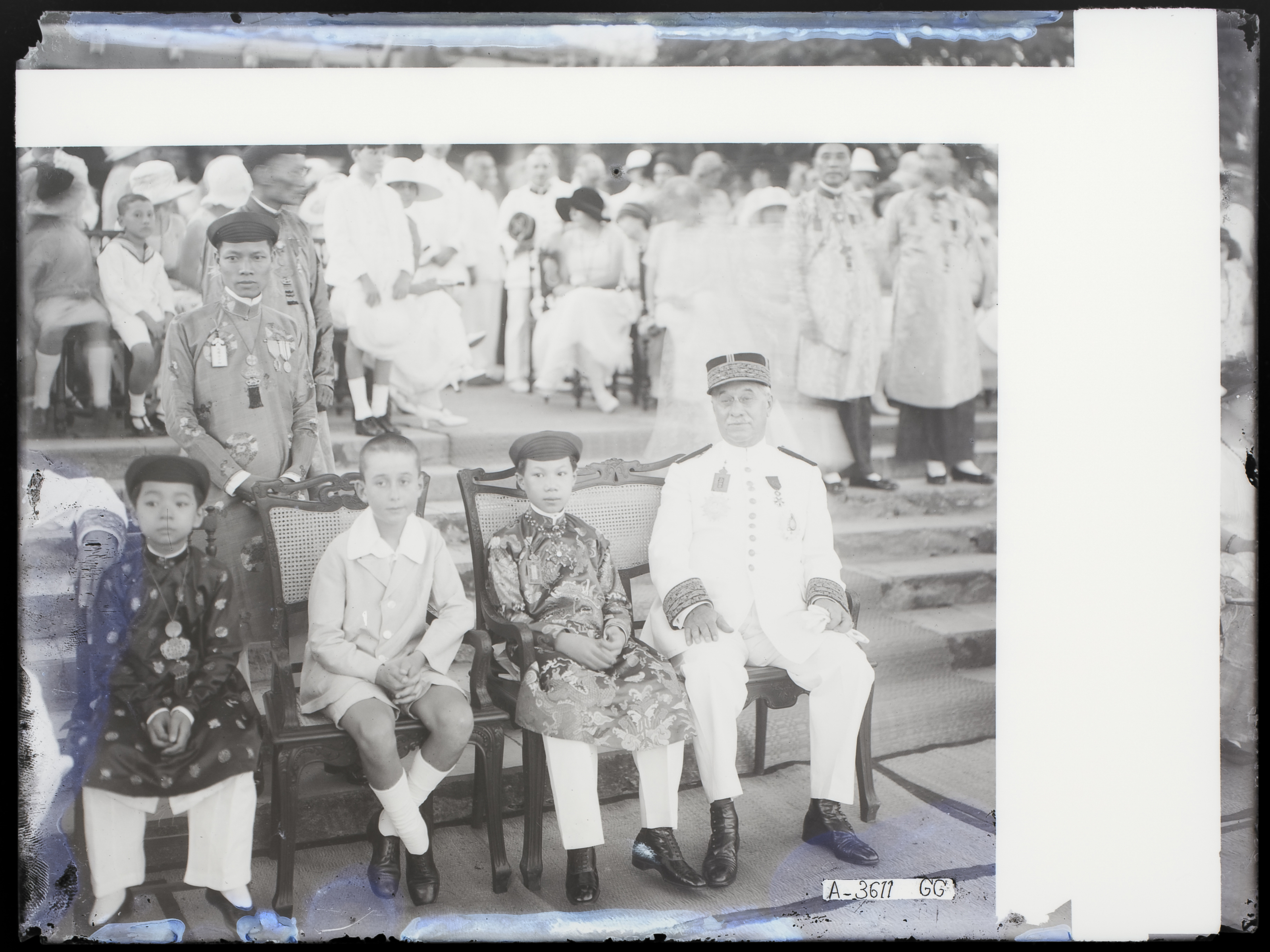
Young Prince Vinh Thuy (2nd right to left) at Emperor Khải Định's 40th birthday anniversary

=== Ascension to the throne ===
On November 6, 1925, Emperor Khải Định died and Prince Vinh Thuy returned to Vietnam to attend the funeral. On 8 January 1926, Vinh Thuy performed the enthronement ceremony and became the 13th emperor of Nguyễn dynasty at 12 years old and took the era name Bảo Đại ("Protector of Grandeur" or "Keeper of Greatness"). He did not yet rule the country directly but through his appointed regent, "Tôn Thất Hân," while returning to France to continue his studies in March of the same year.

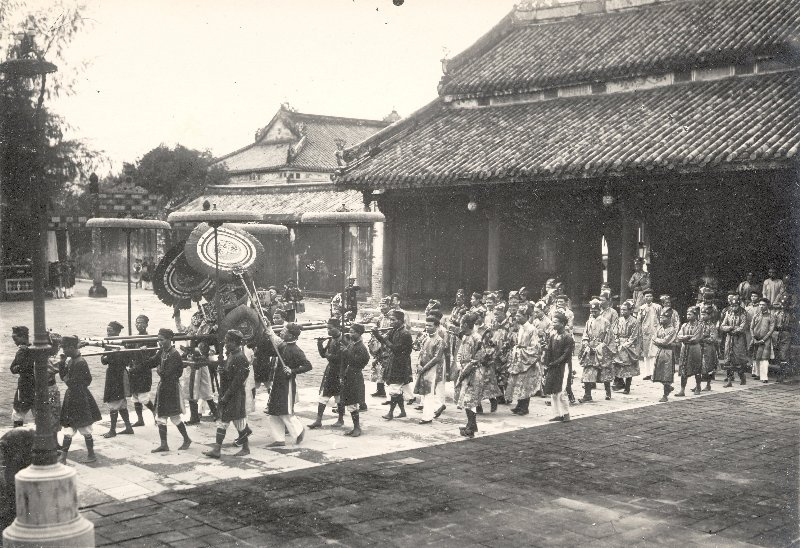
Enthronement ceremony of the emperor at the Imperial City, Huế

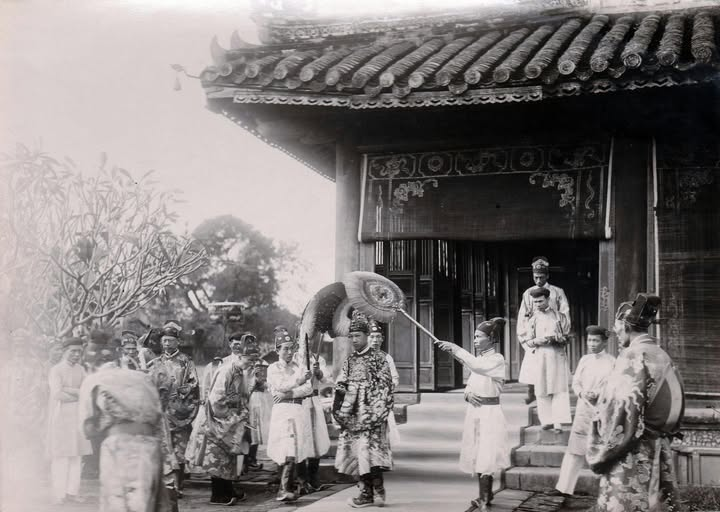
Bảo Đại on coronation date

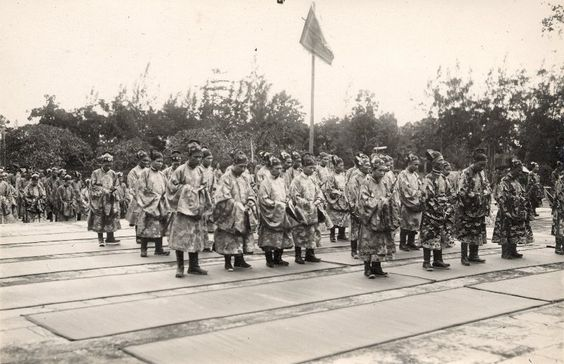
Mandarins at coronation ceremony

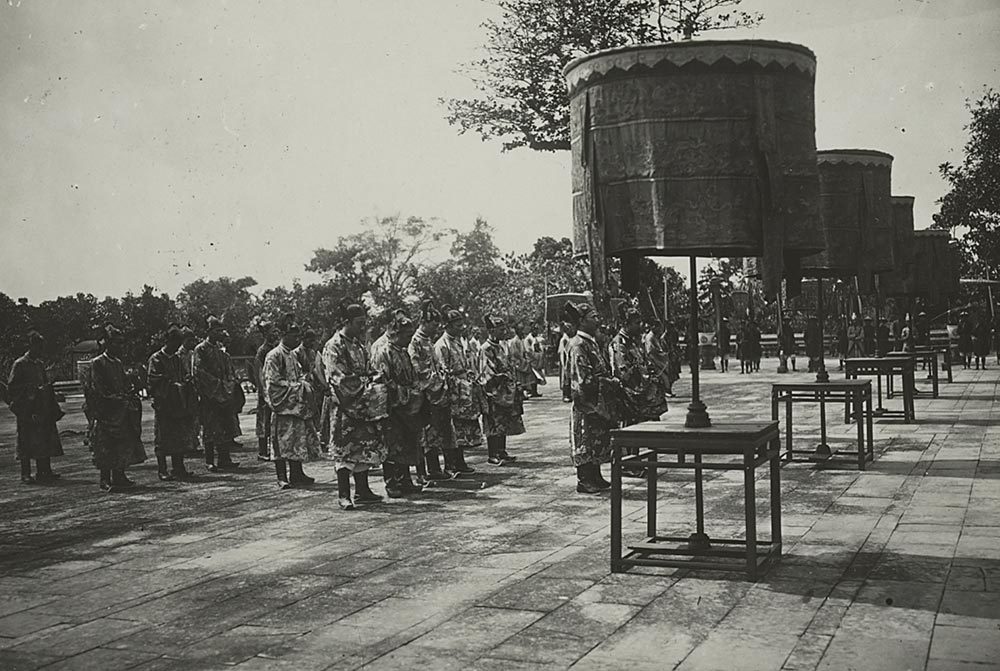
Mandarins in coronation ceremony of Bảo Đại

=== Return to France ===
The imperial court also sent a Confucian scholar to France to teach the emperor Chữ Hán and Vietnamese etiquette, but French teachers later barred him from doing his duty. After returning to Vietnam to rule, Bảo Đại himself admitted that "he almost knew nothing about the history of his dynasty and country, even the colonial rule events."

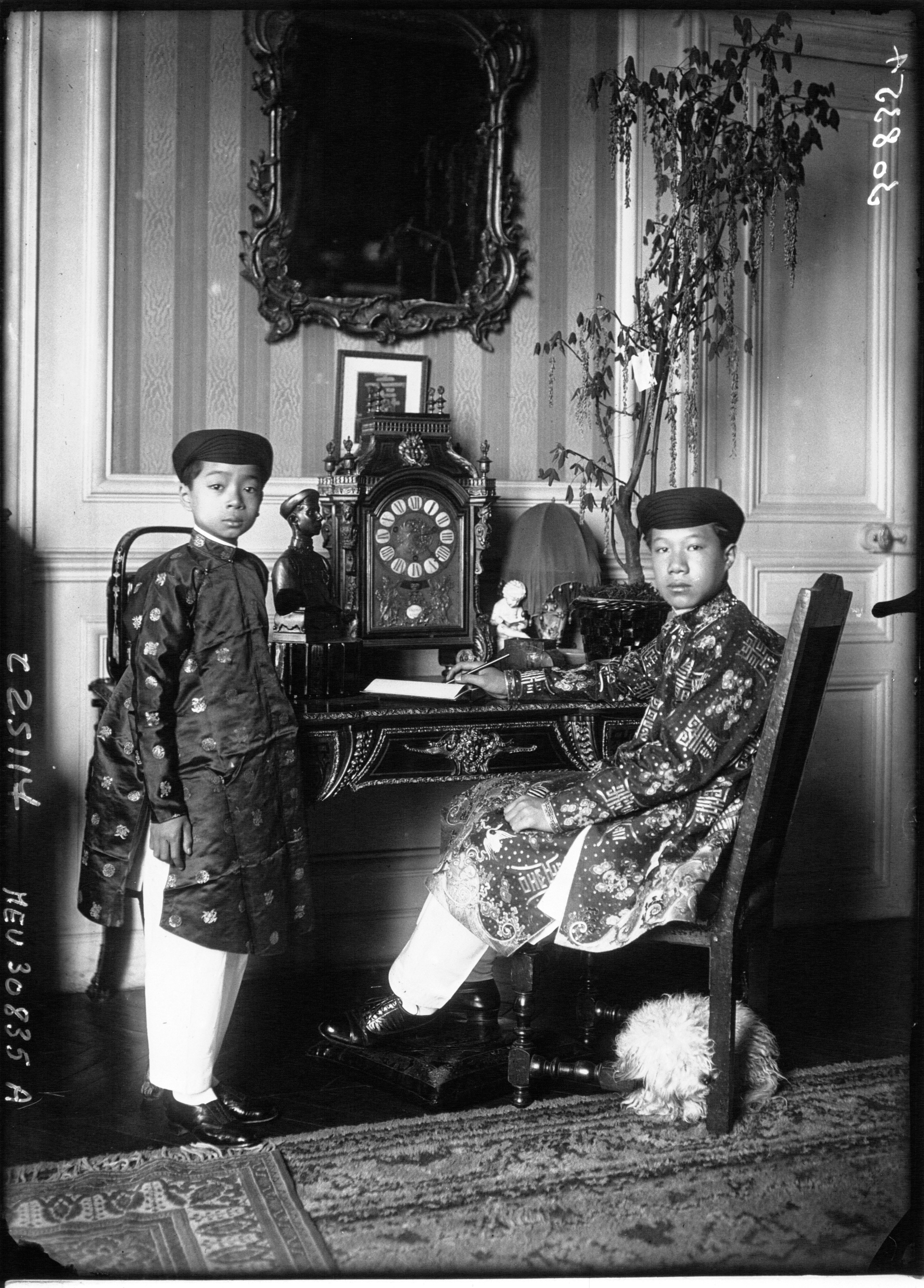
Crown prince Vĩnh Thụy (right) and his cousin Vĩnh Cẩn in Paris (1926) during studying in France

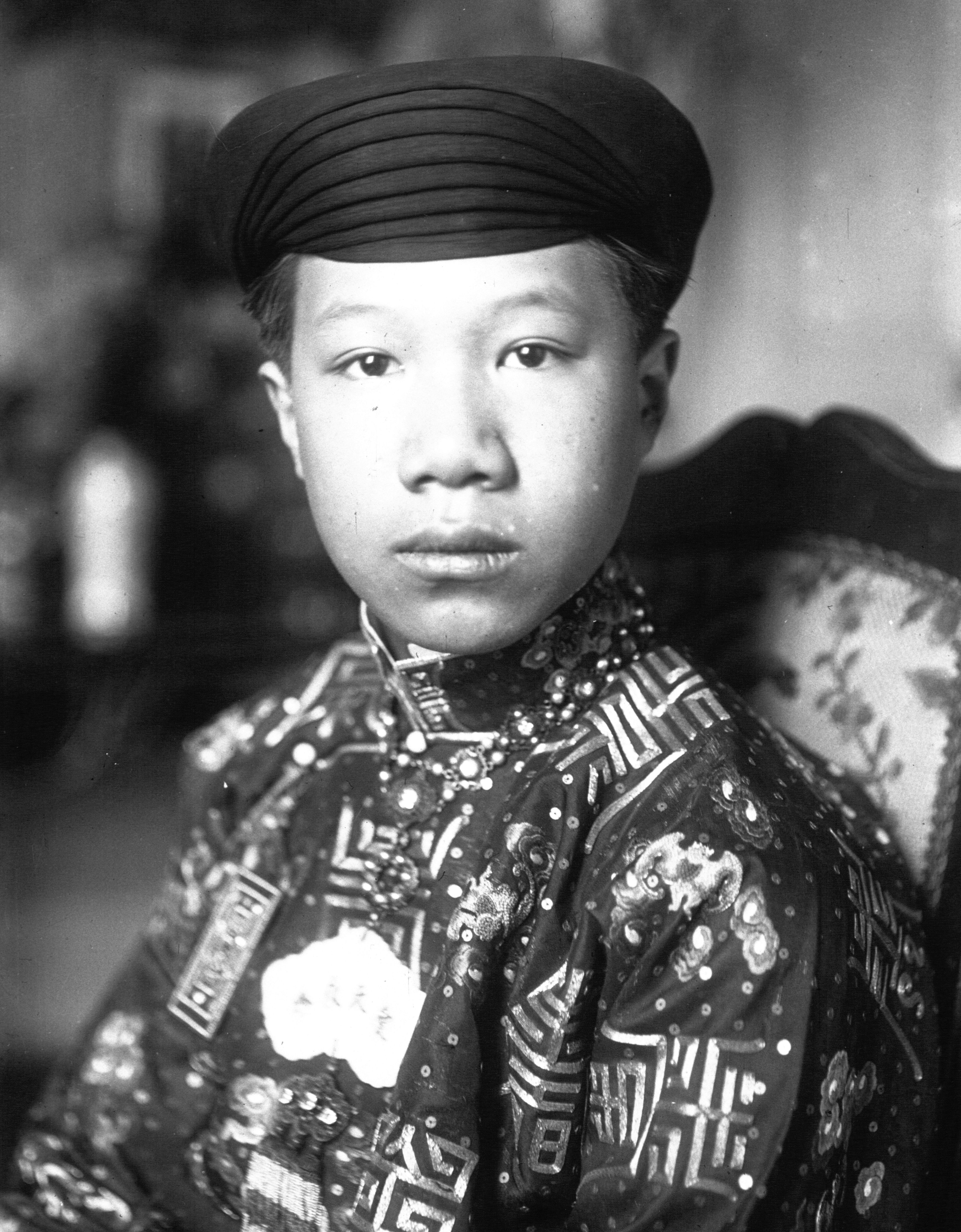
Bảo Đại in Paris, 1926

In France, his adoptive father, Jean François Eugène Charles, the former governor of Annam, was responsible for the emperor's education. When Bảo Đại traveled to study in France, Emperor Khai Dinh entrusted Charles to look after his son. Every day at noon and after school, Bảo Đại went to Charles's house at the Rue des Bourdonnais and was not allowed to go anywhere until the evening. Besides managing Bảo Đại's studies at school, Charles also took Bảo Đại on vacation in Vichy or at his private residence in Prades during the summer. Charles likely considered Bảo Đại as the part of his family and monitored Bảo Đại to train him to become the future ruler. After morning classes, he had to spend time on doing homework very diligently with other fellow countrymen.

In 1930, Bảo Đại started to study at Sciences Po in Paris and lived in his private home at Rue 13 Lamballe. According to the newspaper L'Asie Nouvelle (New Asia), Bảo Đại developed interests in sports such as tennis, golf, and skiing. To the conservative Vietnamese monarchy, this was a new revolution in the imperial family, as the former emperors did not participate in any activities of commoners. The newspaper described him feeling more comfortable and suitable with western lifestyle and entertainments in Paris like clubbing and partying rather than political activities or ruling his own country.

The young man enjoyed this way of life and was uneasy to change and adapt to the conservative Vietnamese lifestyle after returning home. In 1932, although there was a proclamation announcing the Emperor's return posted at Meridian Gate, with millions of Vietnamese people looking forward to it, he was still hesitant. It seemed that he had not yet made up his mind to return to his country.

== Return to Vietnam and assassination plot ==
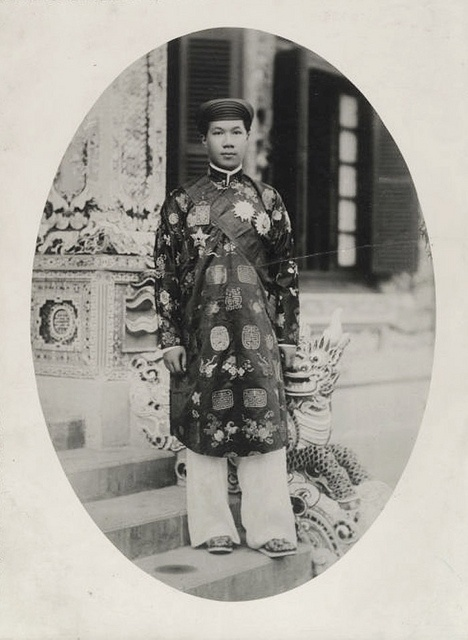
Emperor returned to Vietnam in 1932 after finishing his study in France

In September 1932, Bảo Đại began his long return journey to Vietnam, aboard a ship named Président Doumer. A farewell ceremony was arranged by the Minister of Colonies, Albert Sarraut, who represented the colonial government in Marseille. All of the places where the ship docked on the journey would organise grand receptions except in Penang, Malaysia (Straits Settlements) because the French secret service had received news about an assassination plot. At this time, the Colonial Committee of the French Communist Party met in secret at 120 rue Chateaudun. Eight people were present, including one European and seven Vietnamese, that planned to assassinate the emperor before his return. This plot was attempted in Paris and Marseille, but was unsuccessful.

They attempted assassination a third time in the Malay Peninsula, but the plot was discovered. On that day, the ship had to secretly anchor far from the reception venue, but the perpetrator did not show up. The ship continued to sail into Vietnamese territorial water, anchored at Cape Saint-Jacques (now Vũng Tàu) with warship protection.

Bảo Đại then transferred to a warship named Dumont d'Urville, which would take him to Đà Nẵng, part of the Protectorate of Annam. Besides that, there were two more ships escorted Dumont d'Urville, together with cannons fired and flags flying as the emperor boarded the warship. Arriving at Da Nang, he transferred to a gunboat and sailed up the Han River to the city. Finally, he boarded a train and traveled another 100 kilometers to Hue. The emperor later wrote in his memoirs: "After many years of living in freedom, I felt as if I am now entering a prison..."

== Reign ==
On September 10, 1932, the emperor began to reform and remove some of the outdated and conservative customs of the imperial court. The twenty-year-old emperor held the first traditional court audience in which the top officials came to congratulate him on his return after a long absence. However, the emperor spoke in French, shocking and offending both young officials with nationalistic spirit and the older officials imbued with Confucianist learning. Bảo Đại reformed the court such as rearranging internal affairs and administration. Then, he abolished some old customs that the previous emperors had established such as his subjects not having to kowtow and being allowed to look directly at the emperor, which had been considered as lese-majesté. When Western officials had an audience with the emperor they did not have to clasp their hands and bow, but rather shook hands with the emperor, and native officials did not have to kneel. He banned the custom of having excessively long fingernails and long beards by the elderly mandarins.

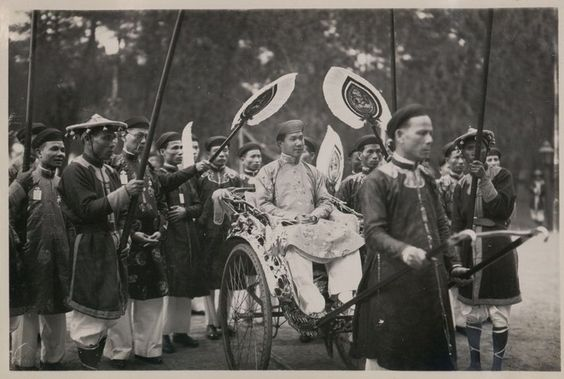
Emperor in cyclo

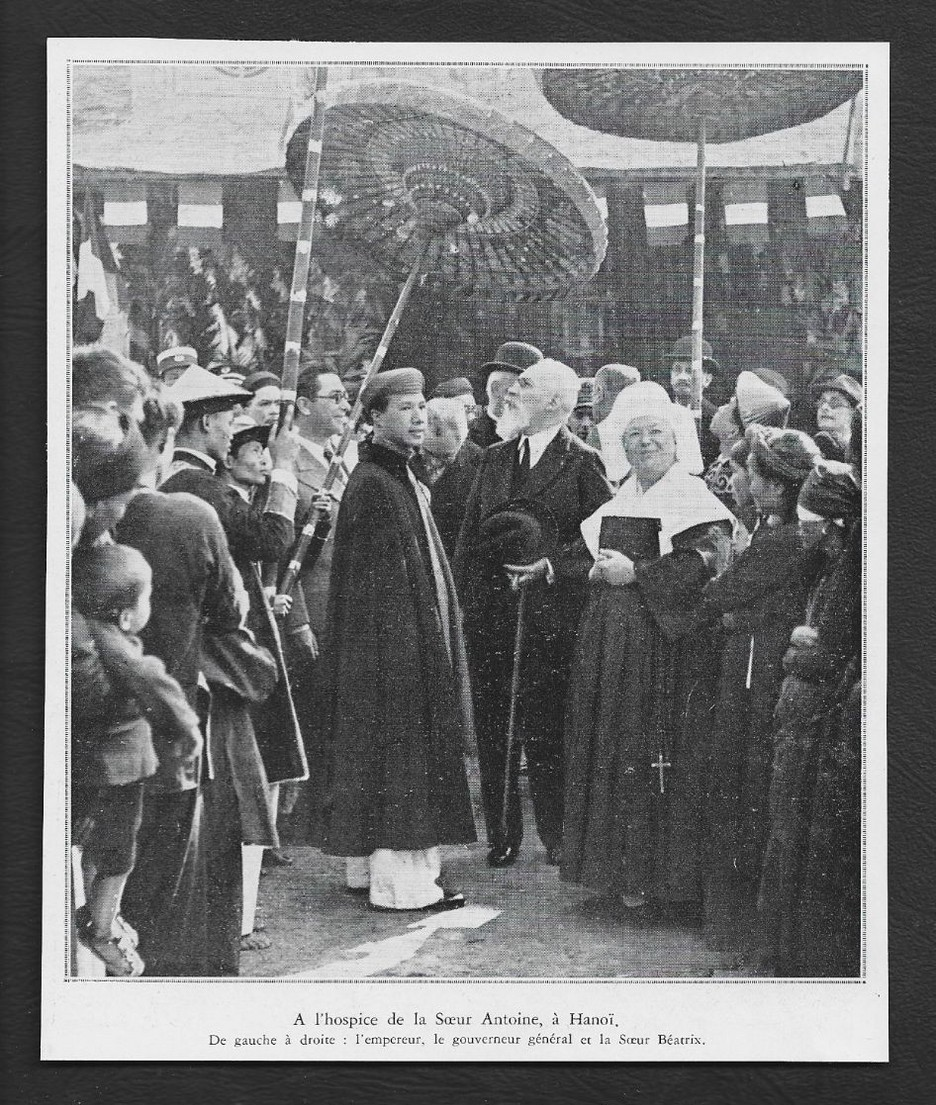
Bảo Đại visits a Catholic church in Hanoi.

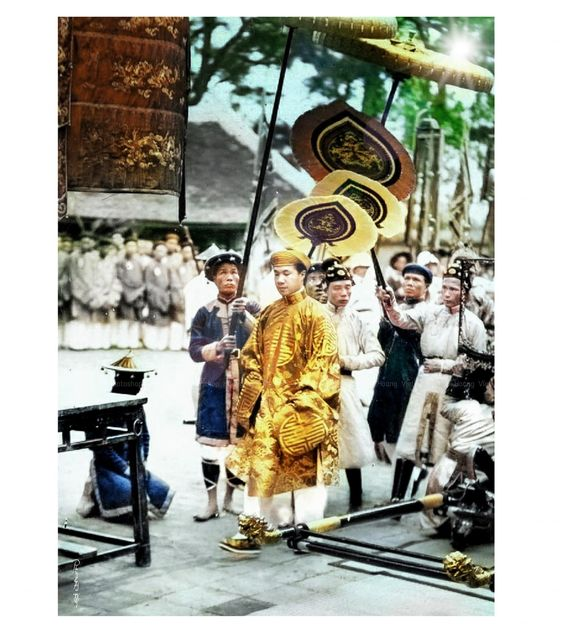
Emperor at Nam Giao ceremony

During the emperor's absence, his grandmothers and his great-grandmother spent a huge amount of money on gambling and they had to use the emperor's private fund to pay off debts but insufficient. To earn the money, those ladies started to sell the officials titles to their creditors who was also the head of the Council of Ministers (Cabinet). This led to the determination of eliminating bribery in imperial court.

On September 19, 1932, Bảo Đại issued his first decree declaring his authority and affirming the absolute monarchy. This document abolished the old regency council established on November 16, 1925, shortly after the death of emperor Khải Định. The emperor would manage the country's affairs directly and pay attention to the progress being made. This decision garnered outward praise from French colonial officials. Previously, the country was governed by a council appointed by the French and completely dependent on the French protectorate. The emperor did not participate in the council's affairs or decision making and was instead treated as a figurehead.

However, Resident General of Annam appointed by Paris, had the right to veto all decisions of the emperor, even the least important ones. Thus, the country's leadership remained unchanged. Moreover, the French official who had a seat in the cabinet or the Council of Ministers, could agree or disagree with the decisions of the cabinet.

Only a few months after his return, Bảo Đại made a tour of the provinces of Annam that had not happened in previous Emperors' reign. The emperor declared directly that he intended to rule alone without a prime minister, thereby expressing his desire to hold real power not only ceremonial role. Bảo Đại proposed a few reform measures which was less important and moderate in level. He tried to change the direction of the old governance, reform national education, pass a new criminal and civil code, gradually moving the country towards a constitutional monarchy. In particular, he reformed the Annam's House of Representatives and the mandarin system, which later caused opposition from Ngô Đình Diệm.

All taxes were collected and distributed by the French protectorate. The Resident-Superior of Annam would determine the budget of Imperial court and provide the fund to run the government. The Emperor also had an annual allowance from the budget of Annam protectorate which he himself had no right to decide of amount received and each month he needed to have the French governors' signature approved to receive it for spending.

On April 8, 1933, Bảo Đại issued an edict to reorganize the cabinet and take charge himself. He appointed five new ministers who shared the same reformist philosophy as him to replace those. He established the House of Representatives to show his appeals to the French colonial officials and allowed the Tonkin Advisory Council to represent the imperial court in cooperating with the French protectorate government.

=== Vietnam in World War II ===
During the second World War in 1940, the Empire of Japan took over French Indochina while their ally Nazi Germany invaded then occupied France. Although they did not dissolve the French colonial administration, the occupation authorities directed policy from behind the scenes in a parallel of Vichy France. The Japanese promised not to interfere with the imperial court at Huế. However, after ousting the French in 1945, they forced emperor Bảo Đại to declare Vietnamese independence from France as a member of Japan's "Greater East Asia Co-Prosperity Sphere"; the country then became the Empire of Vietnam.

Bảo Đại, however, appeared to believe that independence was an irreversible course. In 1944, he wrote to General de Gaulle, leader of the Free French:

You have suffered too much during four deadly years, not to understand that the Vietnamese people, who have a history of twenty centuries and an often glorious past, no longer wish, no longer can support any foreign domination or foreign administration...You could understand even better if you were able to see what is happening here, if you were able to sense the desire for independence that has been smoldering in the bottom of all hearts and which no human force can any longer hold back. Even if you were to arrive to re-establish a French administration here, it would no longer be obeyed; each village would be a nest of resistance, every former friend an enemy, and your officials and colonials themselves would ask to depart from this unbreathable atmosphere.

=== Independence declaration and establishment of Empire of Vietnam ===
After Japanese coup d'état in French Indochina, the French colonial administration collapsed and the establishment of a new government was supported by Japan as an urgent requirement and the Empire of Vietnam was born in that context. According to the arrangement of the Imperial Japanese Army, emperor Bảo Đại met with Japan's supreme advisor, Ambassador Yokoyama Masayuki at Kien Trung Palace to sign the "Indepencence Declaration of Vietnam" on March 11, 1945 (this declaration was prepared by Japan and they pressured the Nguyễn dynasty's mandarins to sign it the night before). The main content of the declaration signed by Bảo Đại was the abolition of the Patenôtre Treaty signed with France in 1884, the unification of Tonkin, Annam and Cochinchina, and the abolition of all previous protectorate and unequal treaties with France. However, the empire was de facto the client state of Japan with the slogan of the Greater East Asia Co-Prosperity Sphere, which was believed to give the Japanese military the right to requisition property throughout Vietnam.

The declaration of Vietnam's independence:

“The Empire of Vietnam's government officially annul all of the French protectorate treaties over Vietnam and the Empire of Vietnam declares that it has restored its independence.

The Empire of Vietnam will henceforth strive to develop as an independent country and as a member of East Asia, will follow and support the commonwealth and prosperity and co-existence of Greater East Asia, in accordance with the principles of the Greater East Asia Joint Declaration.

The Empire of Vietnam declares its intention to cooperate wholeheartedly with the Empire of Japan with trusts in the sincerity of Japan to implement the above-mentioned purposes.”

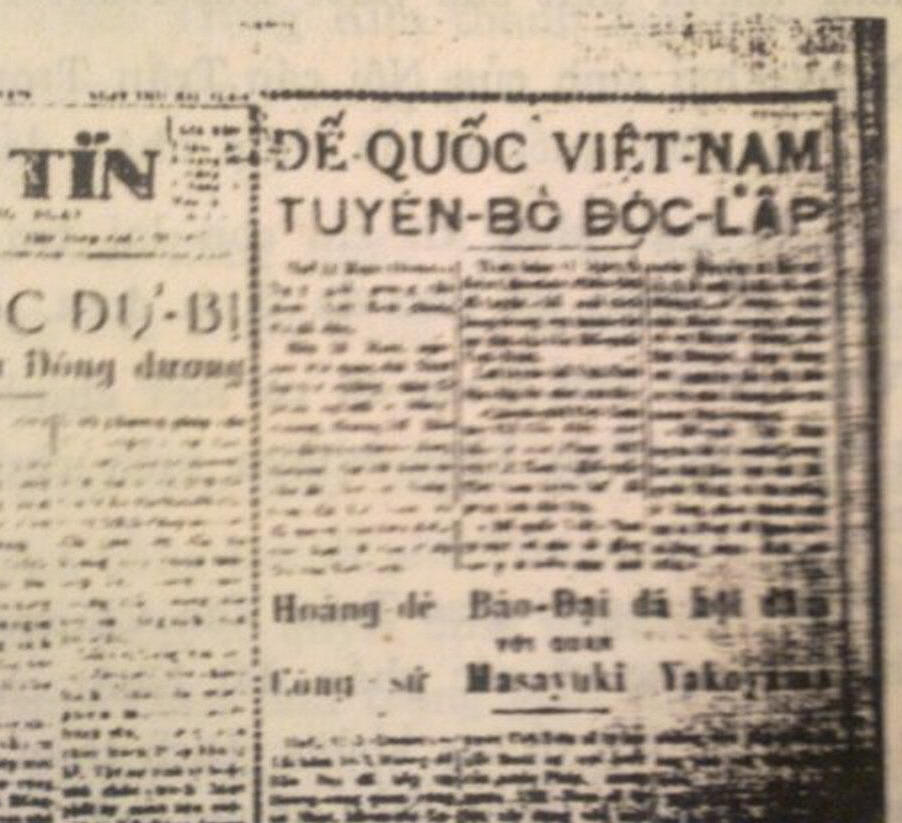
Declaration of Empire of Vietnam in 1945

New flag of Empire of Vietnam

On April 7, 1945, Bảo Đại signed the Decree No. 5 approving the establishment of Trần Trọng Kim's cabinet. On May 12, he dissolved the House of Representatives of Annam. In June 1945, the Trần Trọng Kim government named the country the Empire of Vietnam, using the 3 striped and yellow flag (Cờ quẻ Ly) as the national flag.

=== Surrender of Japan ===
On August 16, 1945, when the Empire of Japan surrendered to the Allies, Trần Trọng Kim declared to protect the cabinet of the Empire of Vietnam. On August 18 he created a National Liberation Committee. Following the advice of the Minister of Foreign Affairs, Bảo Đại sent a message to the leaders of the Allies (Harry S. Truman, Winston Churchill, Chiang Kai-shek and Charles de Gaulle) requesting recognition of the Empire of Vietnam. On August 18, Bảo Đại sent a message to De Gaulle requesting recognition of the Empire of Vietnam. However, De Gaulle was not interested in Bảo Đại's proposal, because he had compromised with Japan, the enemy of France. De Gaulle expected to support a Vietnamese monarchy without Bảo Đại, but instead one by Vĩnh San (former emperor Duy Tân), who was considered a "Gaullist" (an enthusiastic supporter of De Gaulle). All letters that Bảo Đại sent to other countries (the US, China, the UK ...etc...) were also not responded to because, according to the 1943 Cairo Declaration, the Allied countries would not recognize any government established by the Japanese Empire in the occupied areas.

By August 24, the August Revolution had broken out throughout the country. With the encouragement of prime minister Phạm Khắc Hòe, Bảo Đại responded to the Privy Council that he decided to abdicate to avoid being an "obstacle to the liberation of the country".

=== Abdication ===
In 1945, the August Revolution succeeded and the Viet Minh forced the Imperial Vietnamese government to hand over power to them. Emperor Bảo Đại decided to abdicate, then he sent a telegram to the "People's Committee for National Salvation" in Hanoi: "In response to the Committee's call, I am ready to abdicate. Before this decisive moment in the nation's history, 'United we stand, Divided we fall'. I am ready to sacrifice all interests, so that national unity can be achieved, and request that the committee's representatives come to Hue soon for governmental takeover."

On August 22, the Viet Minh seized power in Hanoi and many other places in the country. The emperor still hoped to remain on the throne by cooperating with the Viet Minh to form a new cabinet under a constitutional monarchy. Then he issued an edict inviting the Viet Minh leader to Hue to form a cabinet.

On the morning of August 23, two Viet Minh envoys, Trần Huy Liệu and Cù Huy Cận arrived at the Imperial City of Huế. At the request of these two people, emperor Bảo Đại read the Abdication Declaration before thousands of people gathered at the Meridian Gate and handed over the imperial seal, sword and the other royal treasures to Tran Huy Lieu in afternoon of August 30, 1945. He became citizen "Vĩnh Thụy". This marked the end of a thousand years of Vietnamese monarchy.

== Post-abdication life ==
=== Participating in Republic ===
Later, Bảo Đại received the letter from Hồ Chí Minh inviting him to be the supreme advisor of the new government of the Democratic Republic of Vietnam that he later accepted.

"The provisional government invites citizen Vĩnh Thụy to Hanoi to be the supreme advisor to the government. If he accepts, there will be necessary instructions so that the advisor can go to Hanoi as soon as possible. Signed: Hồ Chí Minh".

On September 2, at 5:00 am, two days after the abdication ceremony, citizen Vĩnh Thụy left Hue for Hanoi, with the position of advisor to the government and President Hồ Chí Minh waiting for him. The convoy consisted of two cars. The first car carrying Vĩnh Thụy was accompanied by Minister of Labor Le Van Hien. The other car carried Prince Vinh Can, cousin of Bảo Đại. After receiving the seal and sword, Tran Huy Lieu's delegation set off for Hanoi the day before. The new state did not have any cars, so the delegation used the former emperor's two private cars.

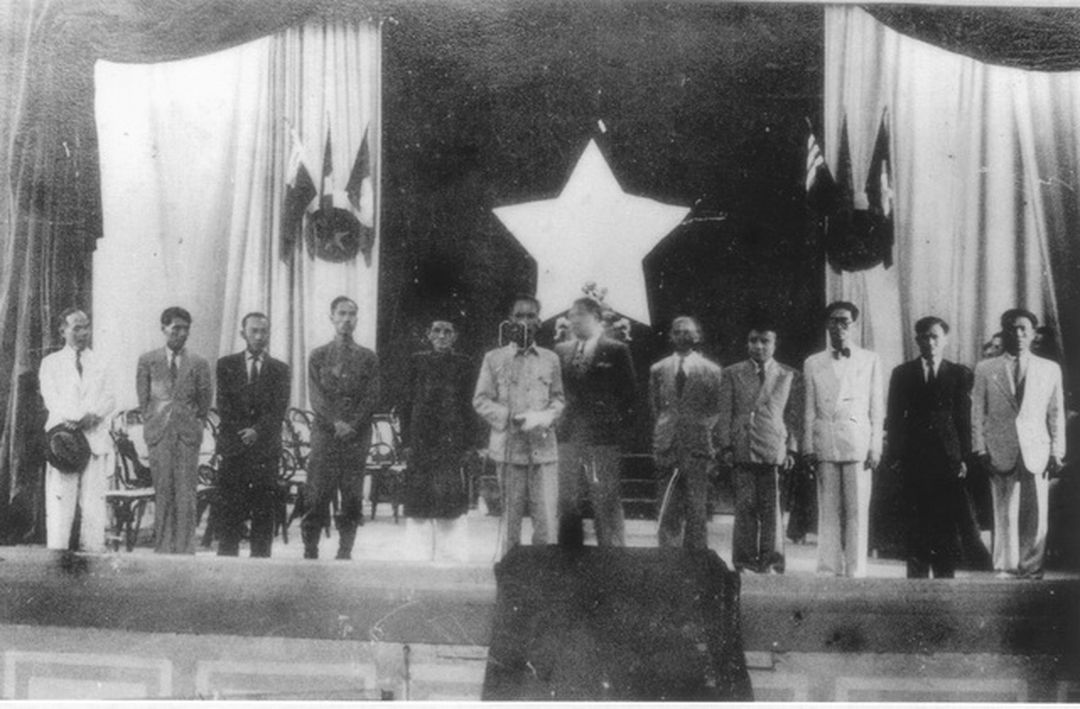
National Assembly of the Democratic Republic of Vietnam on 2 March 1946

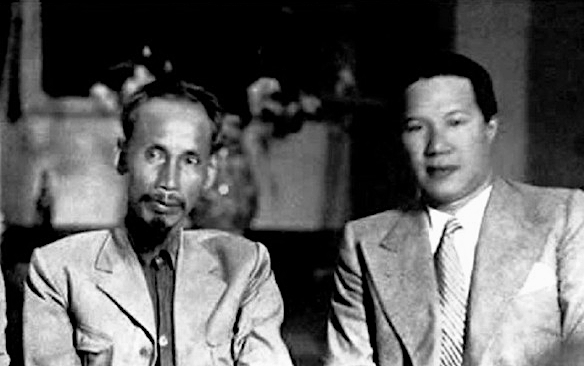
Bảo Đại (right) as the "supreme advisor" to the government of the DRV led by Hồ Chí Minh (left), September 1945

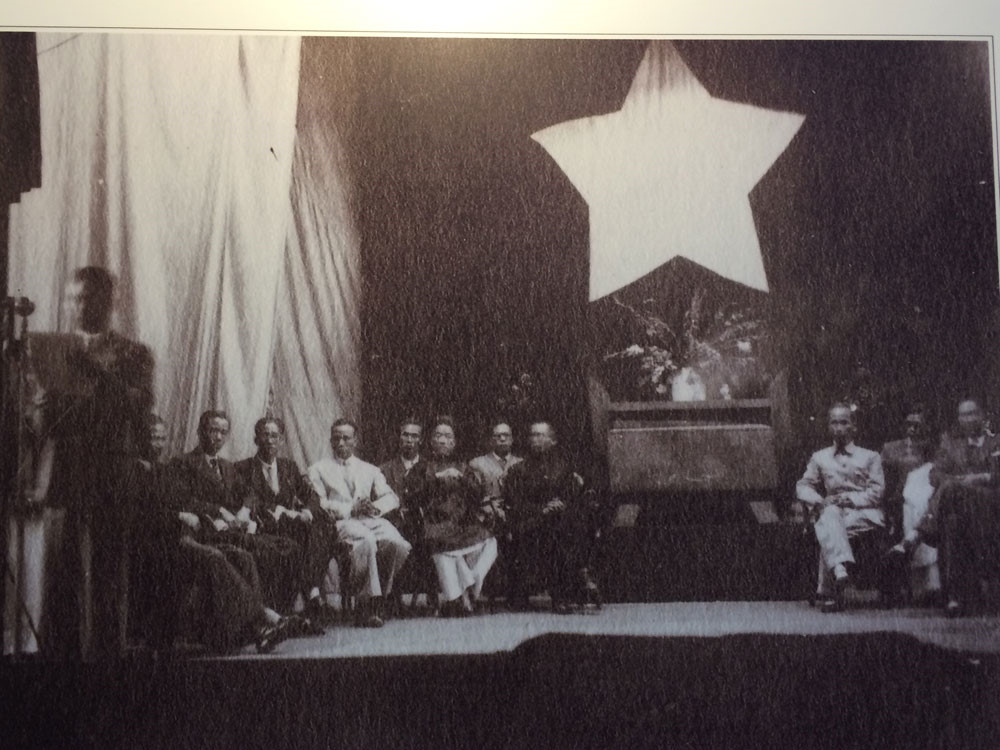
Members of the National Assembly of the DRV, Bảo Đại (far right)

After his abdication, Bảo Đại was treated very well and financially supported by the government of the Democratic Republic of Vietnam. On September 4, 1945, Vĩnh Thụy arrived in Hanoi to take his position. On September 5, President Hồ Chí Minh as well as Chairman of the Provisional Government welcomed the former Emperor Bảo Đại at the Tonkin Palace (now State Guest House). On September 10, President Hồ Chí Minh signed Decree No. 23/SL appointing citizen Vĩnh Thụy as "Supreme Advisor of the Provisional Revolutionary Government of Vietnam". He was one of the 7 members of the Constitution Drafting Committee leaded by Hồ Chí Minh.

On January 6, 1946, Vĩnh Thụy was elected as a delegate to the first National Assembly of the Democratic Republic of Vietnam. On March 7, one day after the signing of Ho–Sainteny Agreement, he was always by President Hồ Chí Minh's side to officially receive French representative Sainteny and pay him a return visit. On March 8, 1946, the Government Council met and decided to send a diplomatic delegation to Chongqing (Republic of China) and France. On March 11, the Government council appointed advisor Vĩnh Thụy as head of the delegation to Chongqing with Nghiêm Kế Tổ, a member of the Vietnamese Nationalist Party; Deputy Foreign Minister Nguyen Cong Truyen, a representative of the Viet Minh, a member of the Propaganda Committee of the People's Committee of the North; Ha Phu Huong, a representative of the Vietnam Democratic Party (part of Viet Minh), a member of the Propaganda Committee of the People's Committee of the Central Region.

=== Exile in Hong Kong ===
On March 16, 1946, Bảo Đại was assigned to join the delegation of the Democratic Republic of Vietnam to Chongqing to visit Republic of China. But he did not return home afterwards, but separated from the delegation to Kunming and then to British Hong Kong. Bảo Đại accepted to go to Chongqing but as a former emperor traveling, not as the leader of the delegation. Therefore, Nghiem Ke To, a member of the Vietnam Nationalist Party, was the head of the delegation.

Later, Pham Khac Hoe was also sent by President Hồ Chí Minh to Hong Kong to persuade Bảo Đại to return but before departing, he heard that Bảo Đại had agreed to side with France, so Hoe cancelled the trip. The Hồ Chí Minh' government also sent a high-ranking government official named Ho Duc Linh to bring gold and foreign currency to Bảo Đại and persuade him to return to the country, but was unsuccessful.

He also frequently visited casinos and dance clubs in Hong Kong under the name "Mr. Wang Kunney". In Hong Kong, Bảo Đại met with many political characters, including General George C. Marshall, the US representative, later brought the agreement with Bảo Đại to President Harry S. Truman. According to the French intelligence agency, Bảo Đại himself asked for their help after he had spent all his money in Hong Kong. The French envoys continued to provide him with financial support, giving Bảo Đại 5,000 Hong Kong dollars each month that made him able to enjoy life of luxury and wealth. He bought an English-style building near Stanley Beach, often receiving guests in Causeway Bay, letting them stay at the Hongkong Hotel or at the Paramount or Saint-Francis. Later, when he sold his private property in Hong Kong, he received a sum of up to one million Indochinese piastres. Shortly after, Bảo Đại wrote a letter back to the country to resign from his position as "Supreme Advisor" in the government of the Democratic Republic of Vietnam.

== First Indochina War and Chief of State of Vietnam ==
Bảo Đại spent nearly a year as "supreme advisor" to the DRV, during which period Vietnam descended into armed conflict between rival Vietnamese factions and the French. He left this post in 1946 after he separated from the delegation in China. He moved to Hong Kong, where the French and Việt Minh both attempted unsuccessfully to solicit him for political support.

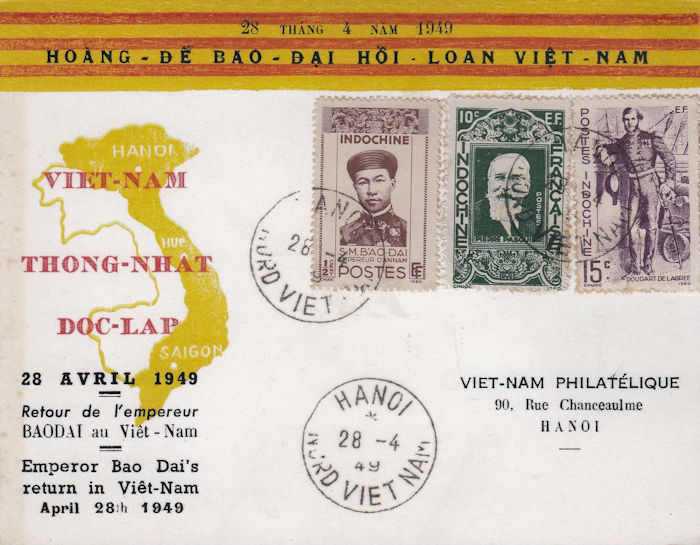
Postcard depicts the return of Bảo Đại from Hong Kong

Eventually a coalition of Vietnamese anti-communists (members of political/religious groups such as the Đại Việt, Cao Đài, Hòa Hảo, and Bình Xuyên) formed a National Union and declared to support Bảo Đại on the condition he would seek independence for Vietnam. This persuaded him to reject Việt Minh overtures and enter into negotiations with the French. On 7 December 1947, Bảo Đại officially signed the first of the Ha Long Bay Accords with France. Despite ostensibly committing France to Vietnamese independence, it was considered minimally binding and transferred no actual authority to Vietnam. The agreement was promptly criticized by National Union members, including Ngô Đình Diệm. In a possible attempt to escape the resulting political tension, Bảo Đại travelled to Europe and commenced on a four-month pleasure tour which earned him the sobriquet "night club emperor". After persistent efforts by the French, Bảo Đại was persuaded to return from Europe and sign a second Ha Long Bay Agreement on 5 June 1948. This contained similarly weak promises for Vietnamese independence and had as little success as the first agreement. Bảo Đại once again travelled to Europe whilst warfare in Vietnam continued to escalate.

After months of negotiations with French President Vincent Auriol, he finally signed the Élysée Accords on 8 March 1949, which led to the establishment of the State of Vietnam with Bảo Đại becoming the Chief of State (國長, Quốc trưởng) on 14 June 1949; the French also oversaw the creation of the Domain of the Crown where he was still officially considered to be the Emperor, this territory existed until 1955.

However, the country was still only partially autonomous, with France initially retaining effective control of the army and much of its foreign relations. Bảo Đại himself stated in 1950: "What they call a Bảo Đại solution turned out to be just a French solution... the situation in Indochina is getting worse every day". Disillusioned, Bảo Đại opted for passive resistance. He refused to play the role of a French puppet and retreated to the resort city of Đà Lạt, where he pursued a lavish lifestyle of sport hunting and romantic pursuits. To disgusted nationalists, this behavior appeared more like dissipation than resistance.

Diệm and other hardline nationalists criticized the lack of national autonomy and refused high government posts. Bảo Đại then spent his own time in the resort towns of Đà Lạt, Nha Trang, and Ban Mê Thuột, largely avoiding the process of governing. His Francophile prime ministers, Trần Văn Hữu and Nguyễn Văn Tâm, were also unpopular with many Vietnamese nationalists. All this further damaged his reputation, as the Việt Minh's armed insurgency, backed by China, against the French-sponsored regime developed into a full-fledged civil war that increasingly became a Cold War conflict. Nonetheless, in 1950 Bảo Đại attended a series of conferences in Pau, France where he pressed the French for further independence. The French granted some minor concessions to the Vietnamese, which caused a mixed reaction on both sides.

In addition to the fairly unpopularity of the Bảo Đại government, the communist victory in China in 1949 also led to a further revival of the fortunes of the Việt Minh. When China and the Soviet Union recognized the DRV government, the United States reacted by extending diplomatic recognition to Bảo Đại's government in February 1950. This and the outbreak of the Korean War in June led to U.S. military aid and active support of the French war effort in Indochina, now seen as anti-communist rather than colonialist. Despite this, the war between the French colonial forces and the Việt Minh started to go badly for the French, culminating in a major victory for the Việt Minh at Điện Biên Phủ. This led to the negotiating of a peace deal between the French and the Việt Minh on 21 July 1954, known as the Geneva Accords, which partitioned Vietnam at the 17th parallel. The north side was given to the DRV, with the State of Vietnam receiving the south. Before that, the State of Vietnam gained complete independence from France on June 4. Bảo Đại then moved to Paris and appointed Ngô Đình Diệm as his prime minister.

== Second removal from power ==
At first, Ngô Đình Diệm exercised no influence over South Vietnam: the Việt Minh still had de facto control of somewhere between sixty and ninety percent of the countryside (by French estimates), whilst the rest was dominated by the various religious sects. Meanwhile, the new capital of Saigon was under the total control of criminal group Bình Xuyên. According to Colonel Lansdale, it had paid Bảo Đại a "staggering sum" for control of local prostitution and gambling and of Saigon's police force.

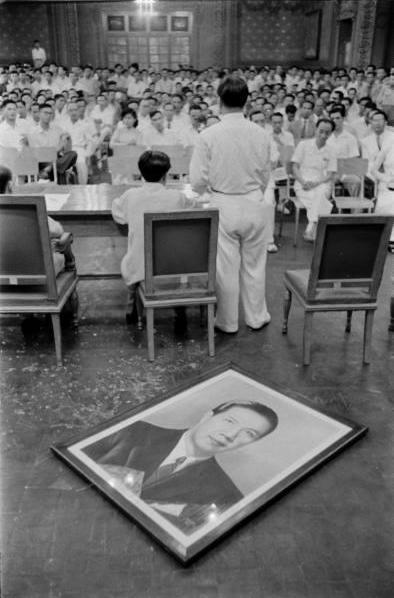
Bảo Đại deposed as Chief of State in Vietnam's national assembly, Saigon, 1955

Regardless, Diệm's forces embarked on a campaign against the Bình Xuyên, with fighting breaking out in the streets on 29 March 1955. In an attempt to protect his clients, Bảo Đại ordered Diệm to travel to France, but he was disobeyed and Diệm eventually succeeded in pushing his opponents out of the city. Using a divide and conquer strategy, Diệm then employed a mixture of force and bribery to sway the remaining religious sects to his side.

Now with a broad range of support, a new Popular Revolutionary Committee (formed by Diệm's brother Ngô Đình Nhu) was able to call for a referendum to remove Bảo Đại and establish a republic with Diệm as president. The campaign leading up to the referendum was punctuated by personal attacks against the former emperor, whose supporters had no way to refute them since campaigning for Bảo Đại was forbidden.

The referendum was criticized as being fraudulent. The official results showed a tally of 98.9% in favor of a republic, with the number of votes for a republic exceeding the total number of registered voters by 155,025 in Saigon, while the total number of votes exceeded the total number of registered voters by 449,084, and the number of votes for a republic exceeded the total number of registered voters by 386,067.

Bảo Đại was removed from power, with Diệm declaring himself president of the new Republic of Vietnam on 26 October 1955.

== Life in exile ==
He lived in Cannes, then moved to Alsace. In 1963, former Empress consort Nam Phương died in Chabrignac.

In 1957, while in Alsace, he met Christiane Bloch-Carcenac, with whom he had an affair until 1970. From this relationship he gave birth to his last child, Patrick-Édouard Bloch, born in 1958 who is still living in Alsace.

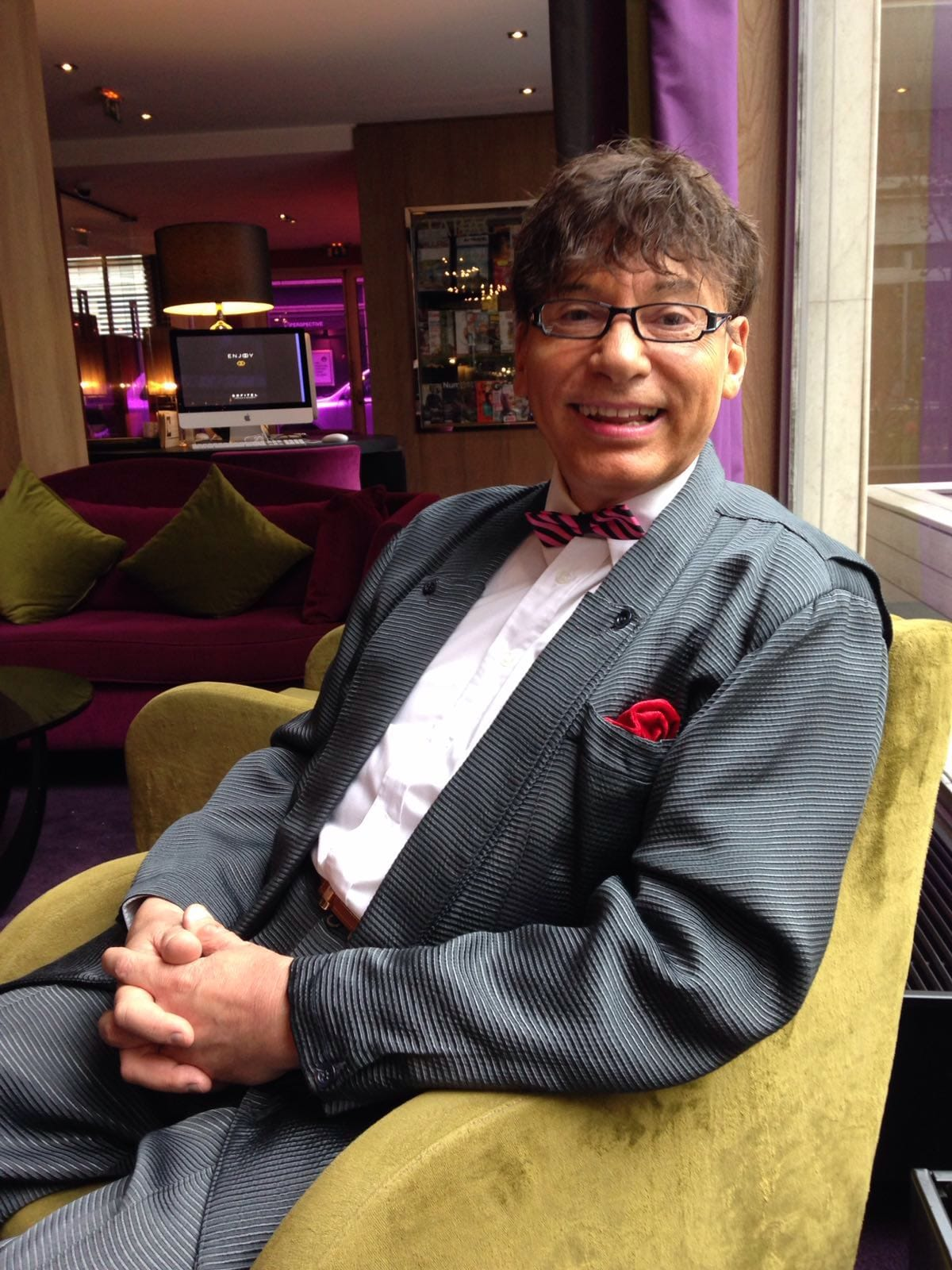
Patrick-Édouard Bloch, youngest son of Bảo Đại

After moving to France, Bảo Đại no longer controlled the economic system in Vietnam as he had during his reign, and many of his businesses in Vietnam were confiscated by Ngô Đình Diệm's government. Under increasing scrutiny from French tax authorities and without continued financial support from the French government, he gradually sold off many of his assets. By the 1960s, his fortune had significantly declined, and several of his properties, including castles, aircraft, and luxury cars, were sold to cover outstanding debts. During this period, he reportedly received a modest monthly subsidy of 8,000 francs from the government of President Giscard.

In 1972, after spending all his assets, Bảo Đại lived with Monique Baudot, a French woman 30 years younger than him and they got married in 1982. In 1988, after a period of discussion with the parish priest of Saint-Pierre-de-Chaillot, Bảo Đại converted to Catholicism, taking the Christian name Jean-Robert. In 1988, Bảo Đại was baptised in France as Roman Catholic.

In 1972, Bảo Đại issued a public statement from exile, appealing to the Vietnamese people for national reconciliation, stating, "The time has come to put an end to the fratricidal war and to recover at last peace and accord". At times, Bảo Đại maintained residence in southern France, and in particular in Monaco, where he sailed often on his private yacht, one of the largest in Monte Carlo harbor. He still reportedly held great influence among local political figures in the Quảng Trị and Thừa Thiên provinces of Huế. The Communist government of North Vietnam sent representatives to France hoping that Bảo Đại would become a member of a coalition government which might reunite Vietnam, in the hope of attracting his supporters in the regions wherein he still held influence.

In 1982, on the occasion of the opening of the imperial Family Association abroad, Bảo Đại visited the United States for the first time. In Sacramento, California, he was awarded with a golden key symbolizing the town and the title of "honorary citizen" of the city by the mayor of Westminster, California. He also visited and congratulated the ceremonies of the Vietnamese Buddhist and Caodaist communities in California and the Vietnamese American communities in Texas. Bảo Đại also took this opportunity to ask the opinions of the Vietnamese communities living in the United States about solutions for national reconciliation. As a result of these meetings, Bảo Đại publicly spoke out against the presence of American troops in South Vietnam, and he criticized President Nguyễn Văn Thiệu's regime in South Vietnam. He called for all political factions to create a free, neutral, peace-loving government which would resolve the tense situation that had taken form in the country.

Throughout Bảo Đại's life in both Vietnam and in France, he remained unpopular among the Vietnamese populace as he was considered a political puppet for the French colonialist regime, for lacking any form of political power, and for his cooperation with the French and for his pro-French ideals. The former emperor clarified, however, that his reign was always a constant battle and a balance between preserving the monarchy and the integrity of the nation versus fealty to the French authorities. Ultimately, power devolved away from his person and into ideological camps and in the face of Diem's underestimated influences on factions within the empire.

== Death ==
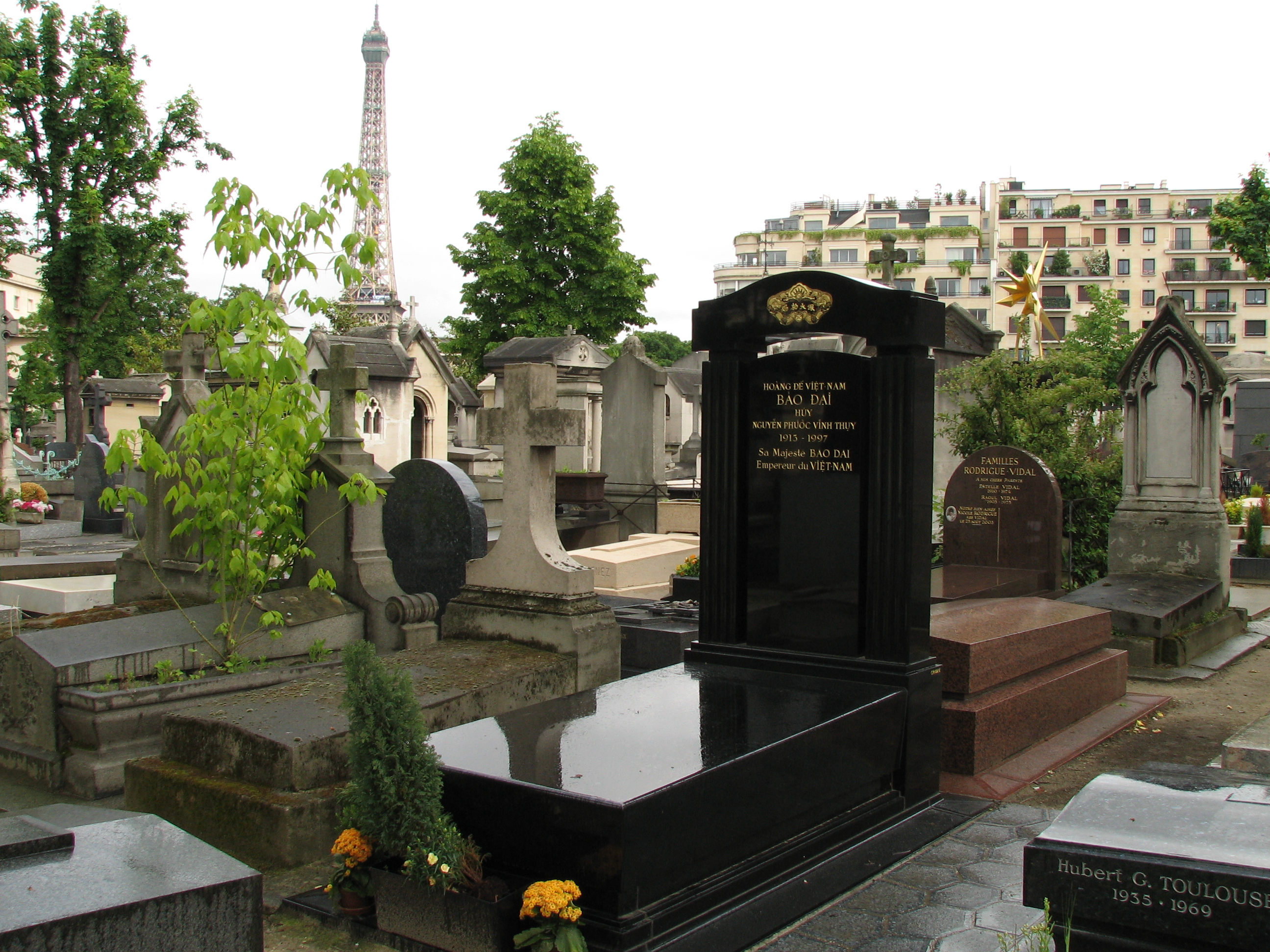
Bảo Đại's burial place in the Cimetière de Passy, Paris

Bảo Đại died at a military hospital in Val-de-Grâce, Paris at 5:00 a.m on 31 July 1997, aged 83. He was interred in the Cimetière de Passy. Bảo Đại lived his last years quietly in a small apartment at 29, rue Fresnel, 16th arrondissement, Paris. All his once-massive wealth and power were gone, and he lived on a monthly allowance of 20,000 Francs from the French government. He was the longest-lived emperor of the Nguyễn Dynasty and the longest-lived deposed emperor in the modern world.

Bảo Đại's funeral was held at 11:00 a.m. on August 6, 1997, at the Saint-Pierre-de-Chaillot church at 35 avenue Marceau, 16th arrondissement, Paris and his coffin was buried at Passy Cemetery on Trocadéro hill.

Responding to the BBC about this event, Ms. Monique said: "Today I am very sad. Of course, first and foremost because my husband has just passed away. But today the history of the Nguyen Dynasty of Vietnam has also ended. I pray for my husband."

== Marriages and children ==
On 20 March 1934, age 20, at the imperial city of Huế, Bảo Đại married Marie-Thérèse Nguyễn Hữu Thị Lan (died 15 September 1963, Chabrignac, France), a commoner from a wealthy Vietnamese Catholic family. After the wedding, she was given the title Empress Nam Phương.

The couple had five children, two sons and three daughters:

- Crown Prince Bảo Long (4 January 1936 – 28 July 2007)
- Princess Phương Mai (1 August 1937 – 16 January 2021)
- Princess Phương Liên (born 3 November 1938)
- Princess Phương Dung (born 5 February 1942)
- Prince Bảo Thăng (9 December 1943 – 15 March 2017).

Although Bảo Đại later had additional children with other women, these are the only ones listed in the clan genealogy.

=== Mistresses ===
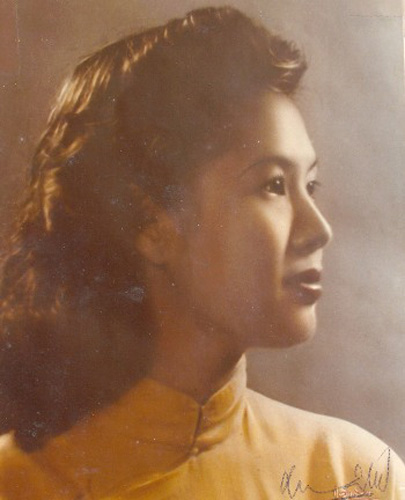
Lady Mộng Điệp

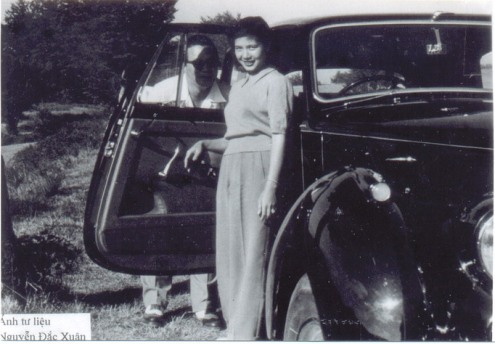
Bảo Đại and Lady Mộng Điệp

Nam Phương was granted the title of empress in 1945. By one count, Bảo Đại had relationships with eight women and fathered 13 children. Those named "Phương" are daughters, while those named "Bảo" are sons.

Name	Title	Issue	Note
Nguyễn Hữu Thị Lan	Empress; Nam Phương	Crown Prince Bảo Long (1936–2007) Princess Phương Mai (1937–2021) Princess Phương Liên (b. 1938) Princess Phương Dung (b. 1942) Prince Bảo Thăng (1943–2017)	The emperor's first wife. "Nam Phương" translates as "Southern virtue".
Bùi Mộng Điệp	Thứ phi	Phương Thảo (b. 1946) Bảo Hoàng (1954–1955) Bảo Sơn (1957–1987)	Called thứ phi phương Bắc ("Northern secondary consort").
Lý Lệ Hà	Mistress		Won Vietnam's first beauty contest in 1938 in Hà Đông. She publicly dated Bảo Đại in Hanoi in 1946. The couple later lived together in Hong Kong, according to her account.
Variously called Huang Xiaolan, Hoàng Tiểu Lan, Jenny Woong, and Trần Nỷ	Mistress	Phương An	Mixed Chinese-Vietnamese Hong Kong actress who had an affair with Bảo Đại 1946 when he was in Hong Kong.
Lê Thị Phi Ánh	Thứ phi	Phương Minh (1949–2012) Bảo Ân (b. 1953)	Sister-in-law of Prime Minister Phan Văn Giáo
Vicky	Mistress	Phương Từ (1955)	This daughter by a French woman has "a half European Asian beauty."
Christiane Bloch-Carcenac	Mistress	Patrick-Édouard Bloch-Carcenac (b. 1958)	Affair occurred in 1957–1970
Monique Baudot	2nd Wife		Second wife. She was a French citizen whom Bảo Đại married in 1972.

== Evaluation of Bảo Đại ==
=== In Vietnam ===
The Communist Party of Vietnam (CPV) considered him to be a traitor. After he was once again helped by France as the Head of State of Vietnam, Ho Chi Minh said in an interview with Chinese media: "Vĩnh Thụy brought the French invading army back to Vietnam and killed more compatriots. Vĩnh Thụy is a true traitor. The French colonists conspired to restore slavery in Vietnam. Vĩnh Thụy is the confidant of the colonists. Although Vietnamese law is very tolerant to those who have lost their way, they will severely punish the traitorous orphans. The Vietnamese people are determined to defeat all colonial conspiracies and fight for true independence and reunification."

On one hand, Bảo Đại remains a highly discussed figure. The CPV labels him a traitor, but does not treat him as harshly as subsequent leaders of the later South Vietnam; his role continues to be studied, ranging from a somewhat sympathetic figure to the Việt Minh to a moderate figure who tried to avoid war, given Bảo Đại himself agreed to abdicate in 1945 to give power for the Việt Minh.

=== Vietnamese diaspora ===
Most Overseas Vietnamese, who are ardently anti-communist, didn't consider Bảo Đại positively, partly due to his weak-willed reputation and inability to confront with the communist threat, as well as his reclusive life and his perceived cowardice. His role is also studied by the diaspora, although recent studies had questioned the perception due to perceived bias by both the Vietnamese diaspora and the CPV.

== Pictures ==
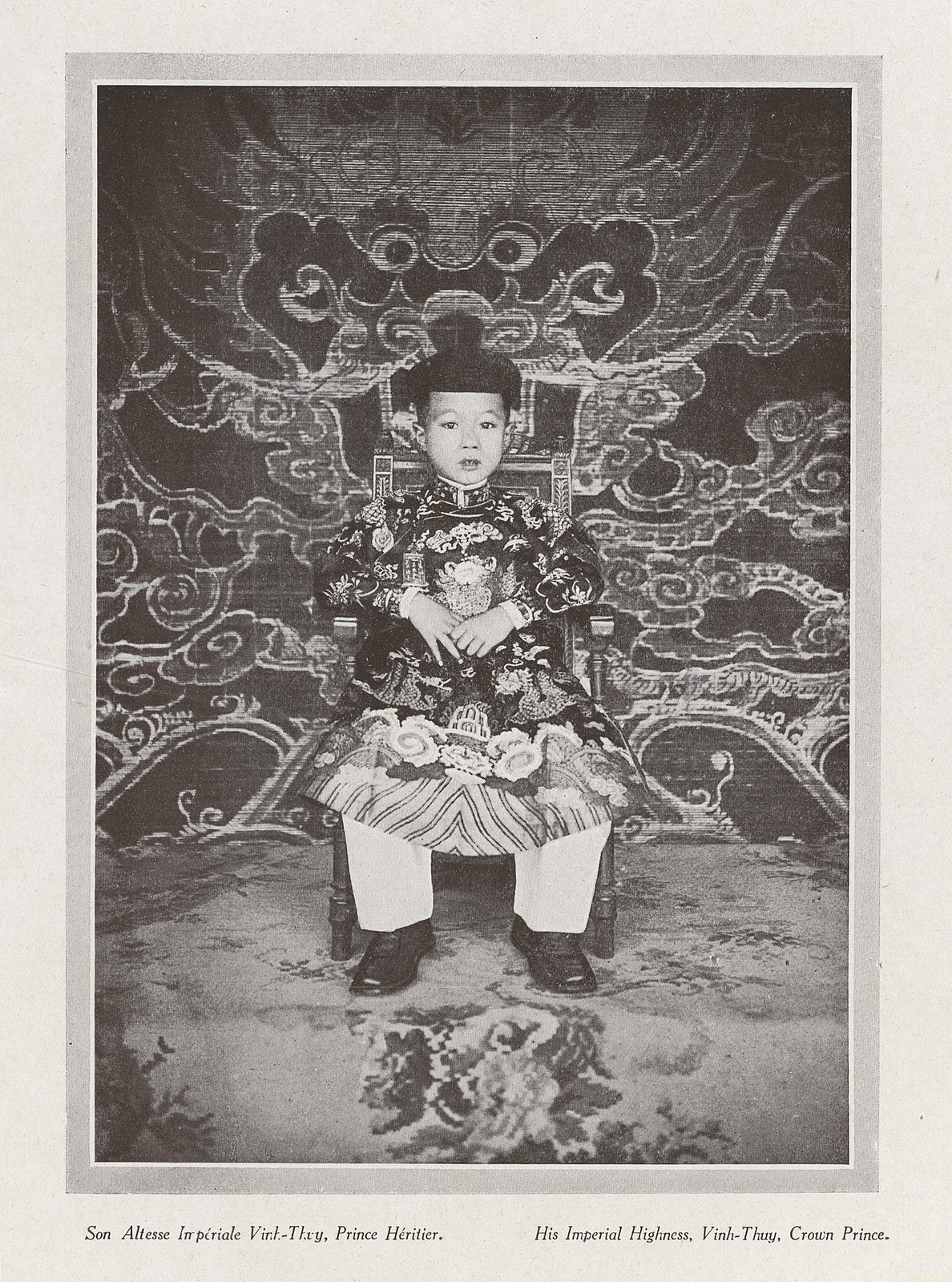
Young crown prince Vĩnh Thụy

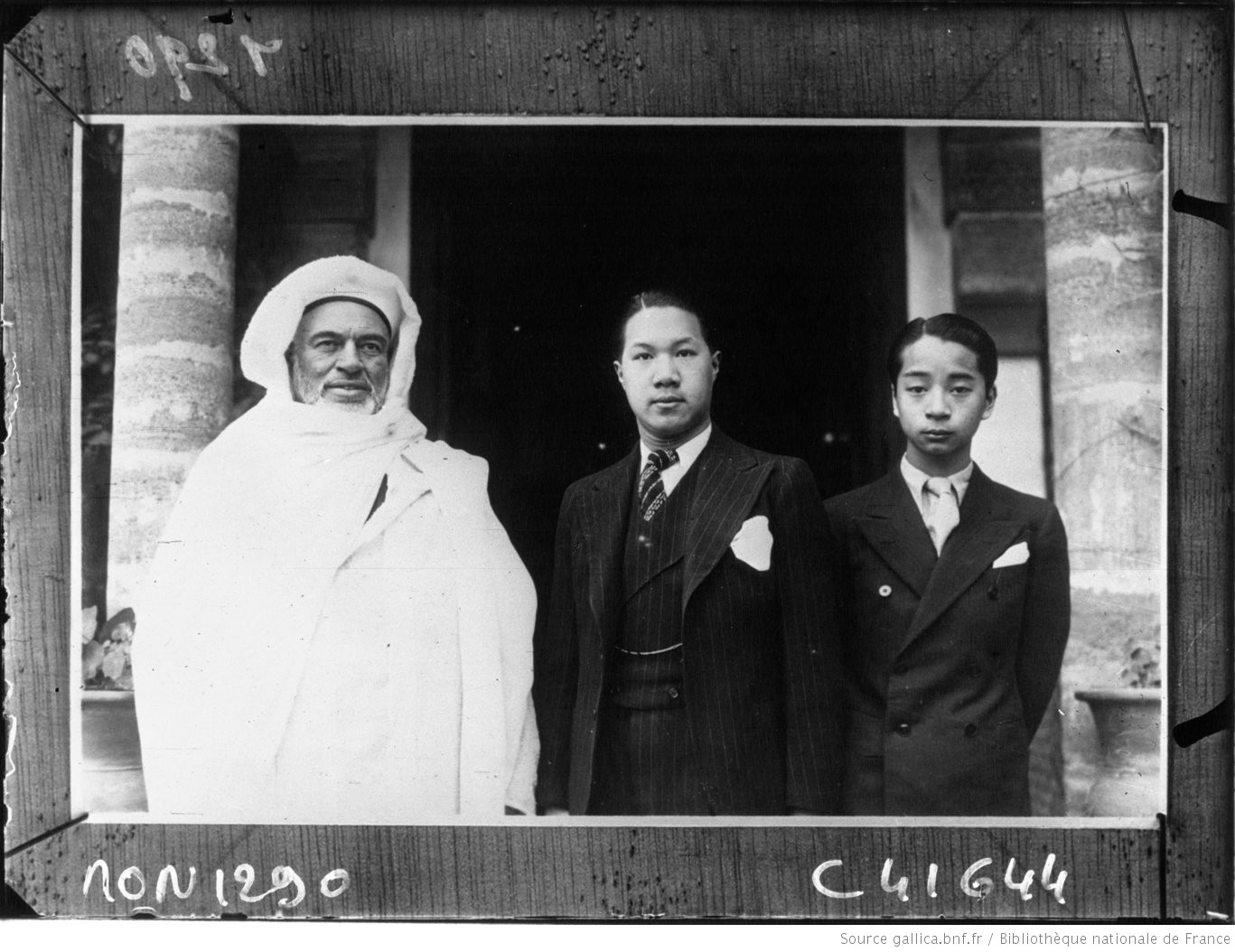
Abd Al Rahman Barjach Pasha, governor of Rabat, meeting with Bảo Đại and prince Vĩnh Cẩn during their Morocco trip in 1932

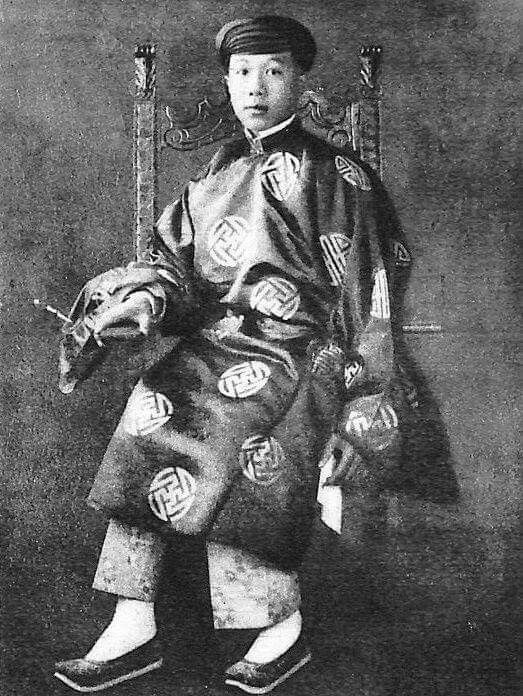
Young emperor

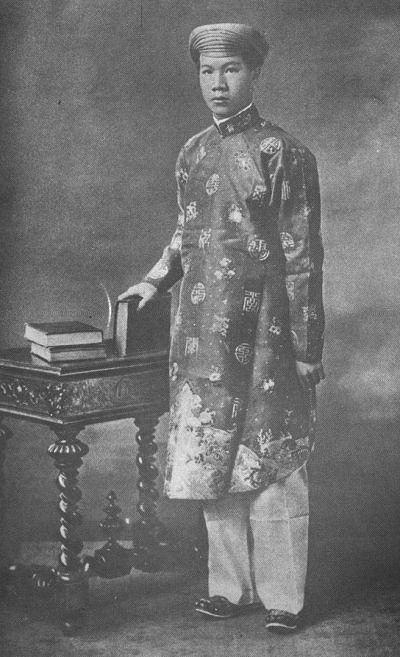
Emperor Bảo Đại

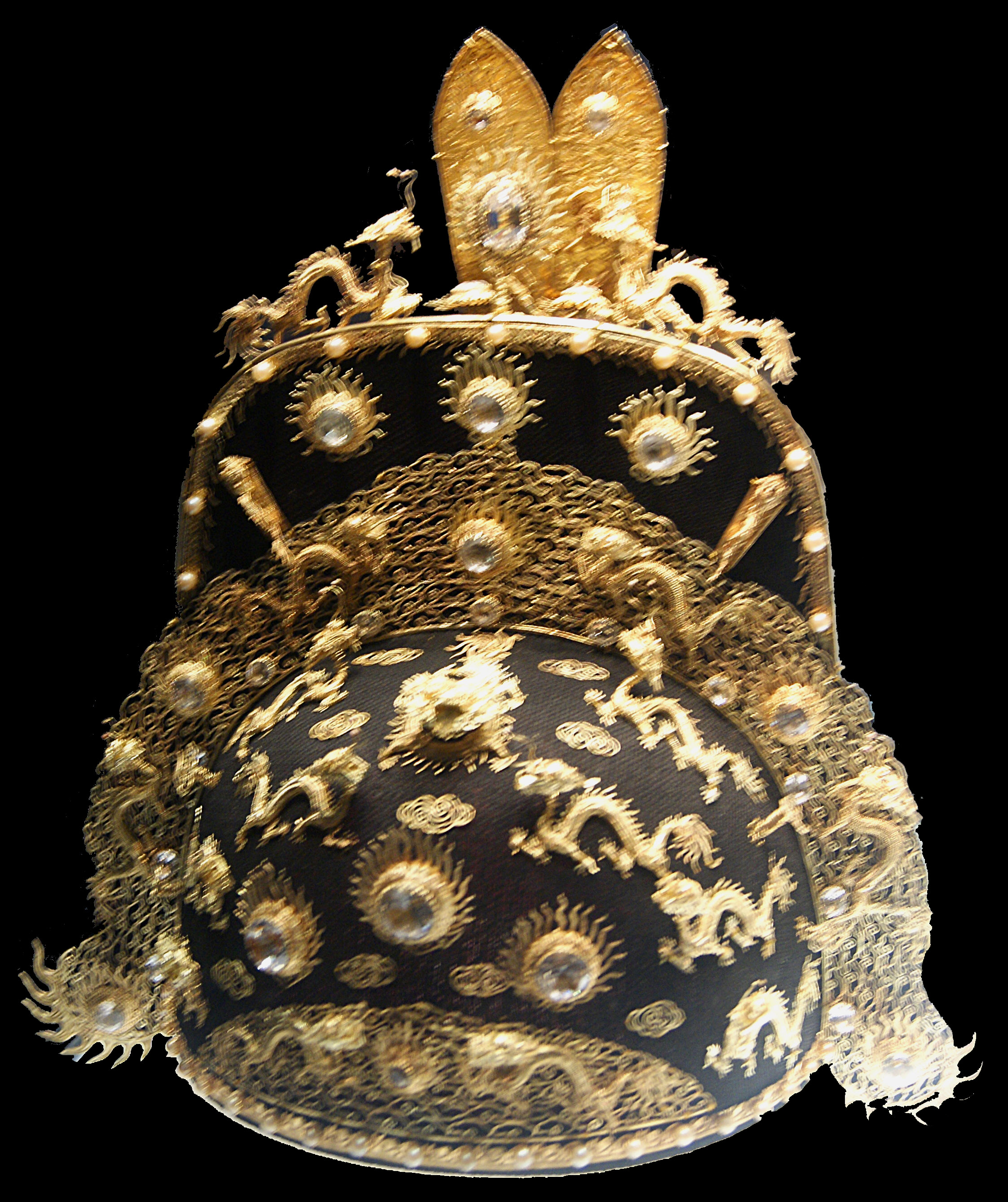
Crown of Bảo Đại used in coronation

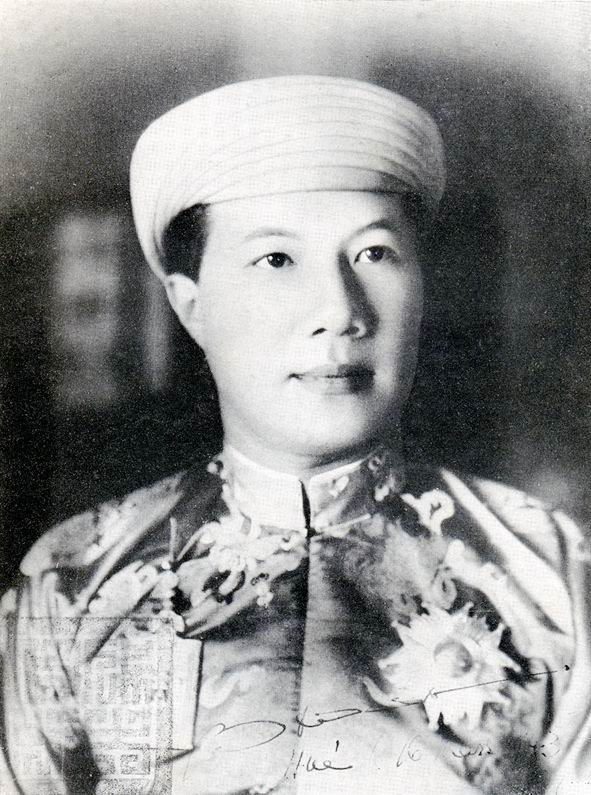

== In popular culture ==
- Bảo Đại was portrayed by actor Huỳnh Anh Tuấn in the 2004 Vietnamese miniseries Ngọn nến Hoàng cung (A Candle in the Imperial Palace).
- On 13 May 2017, a watch owned by Bảo Đại, a unique Rolex ref. 6062 triple calendar moonphase watch made for him while he was working in Geneva, became one of the most expensive watches ever sold, selling for a then record price of US$5,060,427 at a Phillips auction in Geneva.

== Bảo Đại coins ==
The last cash coin ever produced in the world bears the name of Bảo Đại in Chữ Hán. There are three types of this coin. Large cast piece with 10 văn inscription on the reverse, medium cast piece with no reverse inscription, and small struck piece. All were issued in 1933.

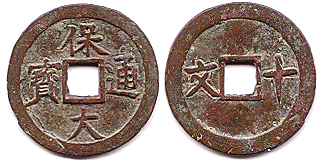
Bảo Đại Thông Bảo 10 văn

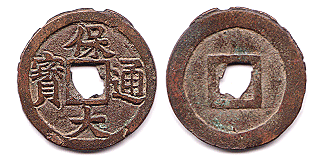
Bảo Đại Thông Bảo plain reverse

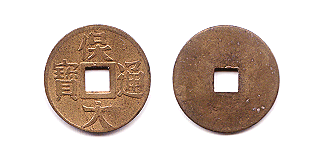
Struck Bảo Đại Thông Bảo

== Quotes ==
- In 1945 when the Japanese colonel in charge of the Hue garrison told Bảo Đại that he had (in line with the orders of the Allied commander) taken measures ensuring the security of the Imperial Palace and those within it against a possible Việt Minh coup, Bảo Đại dismissed the protection declaring "We do not wish a foreign army to spill the blood of our people."
- He explained his abdication in 1945 saying "We would prefer to be a citizen of an independent country rather than Emperor of an enslaved one."
- When, after World War II, France attempted to counter Hồ Chí Minh's popularity and gain the support of the U.S. by creating an associated state with him, he said "What they call a Bảo Đại solution turns out to be just a French solution."
- In a rare public statement from France in 1972, Bảo Đại appealed to the people of Vietnam for national reconciliation, saying "The time has come to put an end to the fratricidal war and to recover at last peace and accord."

== Honours ==
=== National honours ===
- Sovereign and Grand Master of the Imperial Order of the Dragon of Annam.
- Sovereign and Grand Master of the Imperial Order of Merit of Annam (revived and expanded as the National Order of Vietnam on 10 June 1955).

=== Foreign honours ===
- Thailand: Knight of the Most Illustrious Order of the Royal House of Chakri (Kingdom of Thailand, 1939).
- France: Knight Grand Cross of the Order of the Legion of Honour (10 September 1932).
- Cambodia: Knight Grand Cross of the Royal Order of Cambodia.
- Laos: Knight Grand Cross of the Order of the Million Elephants and the White Parasol.
- Belgium: Knight Grand Cross of the Order of the Crown (1935).
- Morocco: Knight Grand Cross of the Sharifian Order of Al-Alaoui (Kingdom of Morocco).
- Johor: Member First Class of the Royal Family Order of Johor [DKI] (21 March 1933).

== Reign symbols ==
Symbols created and / or used during the reign of Bảo Đại
Symbol	Image	Description
Emperor of the Nguyễn dynasty
8 imperial seals created for Emperor Bảo Đại.		See Seals of the Nguyễn dynasty.
Personal standard of emperors Khải Định and Bảo Đại		Flag ratio: 2:3.
Personal coat of arms of Bảo Đại.		A sword per fess charged with the ramparts of the Purple Forbidden City in Huế, inscribed with two Traditional Chinese (Hán) characters (保大) and supported by a single dragon. Influences:
Bảo Đại Thông Bảo (保大通寶)		The last cash coins issued by a government in both Vietnam and the world.
Bảo Đại Bảo Giám (保大寳鑑)		A series of silver coins bearing his reign era.
Chief of State of Vietnam
Seal as the chief of state of Vietnam.		A seal with the inscriptions "Quốc-gia Việt-Nam", "Đức Bảo Đại Quốc-trưởng" written in Latin script and "保大國長" in seal script.
Personal standard		Flag ratio: 2:3. Influences:

Bảo Đại House of Nguyễn Phúc Born: 22 October 1913 Died: 31 July 1997
Regnal titles
Preceded by Khải Định	Emperor of Vietnam; 8 January 1926 – 25 August 1945	Last Emperor (abdicated)
Political offices
Preceded by Nguyễn Văn Xuân as president	Head of state of Vietnam; 13 June 1949 – 30 April 1955	Succeeded by Ngô Đình Diệm as president
Preceded by Khải Định	Head of the House of Nguyen Phuc; 8 January 1926 – 31 July 1997	Succeeded by Bảo Long
