= Bảo Ân =

Vietnamese prince

Nguyễn Phúc Bảo Ân
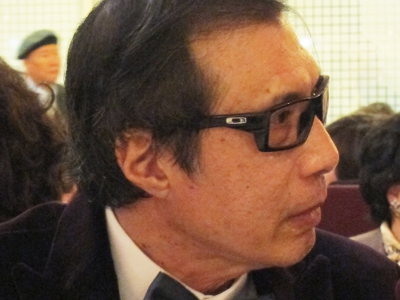
- Predecessor: Bảo Thăng
- Successor: Quý Khang
- Born: 3 November 1951 (age 75); Đà Lạt, French Indochina
- Issue: Thụy Sĩ (son); Quý Khang (son)
- House: Nguyen Phuc
- Father: Bảo Đại
- Mother: Lê Thị Phi Ánh

Nguyễn Phúc Bảo Ân (born 3 November 1951, Đà Lạt) is an illegitimate son of Bảo Đại, the last emperor of Vietnam, and concubine Lê Thị Phi Ánh.

In 1955, Prime Minister Ngo Dinh Diem established a referendum committee to depose Head of State Bảo Đại and became the new Head of State. After that, many of Lê Thị Phi Anh's villas in Saigon, Đà Lạt, and France were confiscated, forcing her and her family to leave their homes and live in temporary rented accommodations.

Bảo Ân's real name, given to him by Empress Dowager Từ Cung at birth, was Bảo Khương. To keep it a secret, when his birth certificate was reissued, he changed his name to Bảo Ân and took his mother's surname. In 1986, his mother died in Vietnam. In 1997, his father died in Paris, France.

Bảo Ân attended Quang Trung Military Academy in Đà Lạt. He immigrated to the United States in 1992 with his wife. They have two children and live in Westminster, California. In 2012, his sister Nguyễn Phúc Phương Minh died in Westminster, California.

Bảo Ân is acknowledged in the book Empire of Vietnam (Đế Quốc Việt Nam) by Professor Phạm Cao Dương.
