= August Revolution =

1945 uprising ending the Vietnamese monarchy

- Part of the aftermath of World War II and the civil conflicts in Vietnam
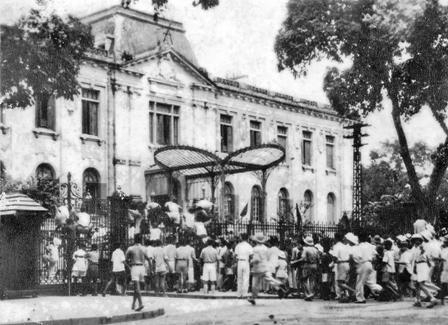
- Occupation of the Tonkin Palace, Hanoi, 19 August 1945
Date	16 August – 30 August 1945 (2 weeks)
Location	Vietnam
Result	Viet Minh victory; Civil conflicts began in Vietnam; Abolishment of the Vietnamese monarchy on August 25; Establishment of the Provisional Government of Democratic Republic of Vietnam on August 28; Establishment of the Vietnamese Provisional National Government by the Vietnam Revolutionary League in Móng Cái on September 1; Declaration of the Democratic Republic of Vietnam on September 2

Belligerents
Việt Minh; National Liberation Committee of Vietnam; Vanguard Youth (from 22 August); Bình Xuyên; Hòa Hảo; Cao Đài Trotskyists: Vietnam Revolutionary League; Vietnamese Provisional National Government; Việt Nam Quốc dân Đảng; Đại Việt Quốc dân Đảng	Empire of Vietnam; National Unified Front; Vanguard Youth (until 22 August); Đại Việt National Socialist Party; Empire of Japan

Commanders and leaders
Ho Chi Minh; Võ Nguyên Giáp; Trường Chinh; Trần Huy Liệu; Nguyễn Khang; Phạm Ngọc Thạch (from 22 August) Dương Văn Dương; Huỳnh Phú Sổ; Phạm Công Tắc Tạ Thu Thâu; Phan Văn Hùm Nguyễn Hải Thần; Trương Tử Anh; Nhất Linh; Vũ Hồng Khanh	Bảo Đại; Trần Trọng Kim; Trần Văn Chương; Nguyễn Xuân Chữ (POW); Hồ Văn Ngà (Japan) Yuitsu Tsuchihashi (Japan) Teiji Koudo

The August Revolution (Vietnamese: Cách mạng tháng Tám), at the time known as the General Uprising (Vietnamese: Tổng khởi nghĩa cướp chính quyền, lit. 'Total uprising to seize power'), was a revolution led by the Viet Minh against the Japanese occupation of Vietnam and the Empire of Vietnam from 16 to 30 August 1945. The Empire of Vietnam was led by the Nguyễn dynasty and was backed by Japan.

Created in 1941, the Viet Minh functioned as an anti-imperialist front led by the Indochinese Communist Party, rallying wide public support across political lines around the goal of Vietnamese independence. The revolution had the participation of factions that did not follow the Viet Minh.

The Japanese army in Vietnam generally adopted a non-interventionist stance to the revolution as they de facto surrendered to the Allies in World War II. While mostly passive, a confrontation in Thai Nguyen occurred on August 20, where Viet Minh's forces besieged the Japanese garrison. The short-lived Empire of Vietnam found itself paralyzed without an effective military force to maintain control. Recognizing the Viet Minh's overwhelming popular support and its organized administrative apparatus, both Emperor Bao Dai and his cabinet chose not to resist the transfer of power. Consequently, the power transition across major urban centers was achieved with minimal bloodshed.

The Nguyen dynasty with its government of Tran Trong Kim collapsed when emperor Bao Dai abdicated in Hue on 30 August 1945. Ho Chi Minh, head of the National Liberation Committee of Vietnam, subsequently declared the establishment of the Democratic Republic of Vietnam (DRV) on 2 September 1945 in Hanoi. However, the new state lacked international recognition, while the Allied powers continued to recognize French sovereignty over Indochina.

Accommodation of non-communists, including the colonial-trained bureaucracy and officials of the Empire of Vietnam, helped bring the Viet Minh to power in 1945. By emphasizing a broad nationalist platform, the Viet Minh mobilized diverse social factions, though certain non-communist nationalist groups remained opposed to its leadership, particularly the Mekong region in the South and several outlying towns in the North where Viet Minh control was limited. In the ensuing power struggle, the ICP-led Viet Minh repressed Trotskyists and non-communist nationalist parties. This further divided Vietnam into hostile camps, beginning three decades of conflict. The resulting political polarization led to the establishment of the anti-communist State of Vietnam in 1949.

== Historical background ==
=== French Indochina ===
==== French colonial rule ====
All of Vietnam was under the French colonial rule from 1884 until the Japanese coup d'état of March 1945. In 1887, the French created the Indochinese Union including the three separately-ruled territories of Tonkin, Annam, and Cochinchina, which were part of Vietnam, and the newly acquired Cambodia; Laos was added to the Union later in 1893. To justify their rule, the French claimed that it was their responsibility to help undeveloped regions in Asia become "civilized." Without French intervention, they asserted, these places would remain backward, uncultured, and impoverished. In a view based more on solid reality, French imperialism was driven by the demand for resources, namely raw materials and cheap labour.

It is generally agreed that French colonial rule was politically repressive and economically exploitative to the original inhabitants; therefore, the Vietnamese struggle against French colonialism was well established by World War II, being close to a century in progress. Incursions by missionaries, gunboats, and diplomats in the 19th century had set off repeated periods of resistance because of the loyalty of the Vietnamese people to the Nguyễn monarchy and traditional Confucian values, which were completely in conflict with European, notably French, interests. From the beginning of the French occupation of Vietnam, thousands of poorly-armed Vietnamese reacted to foreign control with various rebellions, a major one being the Cần Vương movement (English: Aid-the-Emperor), a large-scale Vietnamese insurgency between 1885 and 1896 against French colonial rule in favour of restoring the de facto, and not just de jure, power of the native dynasty.

In 1917, a band of political prisoners, common criminals and mutinous prison guards seized the Thái Nguyên Penitentiary. The extraordinary regional and social diversity of its force makes the Thái Nguyên uprising a compelling prequel to the modern nationalist movements of the 1930s. Although all of the rebellions failed without exception, they remained a powerful symbol of resistance and calling to better days in the local population.

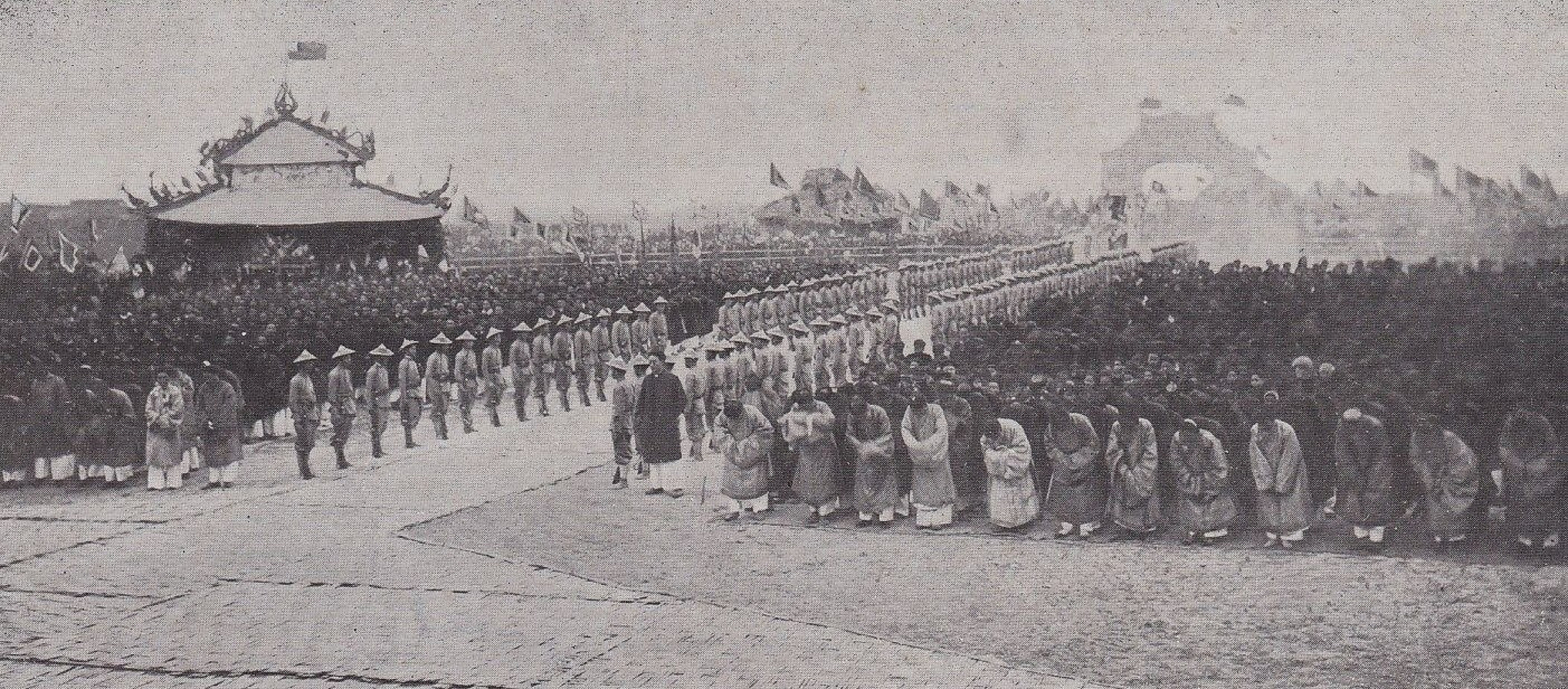
Thanh Hoá in 1932

==== National independence movements ====
During the colonial period, the French (in their quest to exploit the people of Southeast Asia) transformed Vietnamese society. Western education and industry were introduced, which had the unintended effect of stimulating the development of nationalist movements.

In the north, the anti-colonial nationalist and workers' movement was heavily influenced by marxist theory after Ho Chi Minh created the Vietnamese Revolutionary Youth League in 1925. On 3 February 1930, a special conference was held in Hong Kong under the chairmanship of Ho Chi Minh, and the Communist Party of Vietnam was born. In October, following a Comintern directive, this name was changed to the Indochinese Communist Party (ICP). Until the party officially went underground in November 1945, it held a leading position in the Vietnamese anti-colonial revolution.

Ho Chi Minh went by many names during his rise to power, including Nguyen Tat Thanh "Nguyen who shall be Successful" and Nguyen Ai Quoc "Nguyen who loves his country". The changes were used to further his cause of uniting the citizens and encouraging them to rebel. Ho Chi Minh means "Ho who aspires to Enlightenment".

In the south, the anti-colonial nationalist movement was more complicated than in the north due to political divisions. The Cao Đài was the first of southern Vietnam's three most influential political and religious organizations to emerge in the colonial era. Officially founded by colonial civil servant Ngô Văn Chiêu in 1926, it would grow to be the largest of the region's politically oriented religious entities, and in many ways the most powerful. More than a decade later, in 1939, Prophet Huynh Phu So introduced another politico-religious organization, the Hòa Hảo. Prophet Huynh Phu So's preaching, alleged miracle cures, and extreme charity drew tens of thousands of adherents to the new Hòa Hảo organization. The third organization was the Bình Xuyên. Though its origins dated to the early 1920s, it only became a cohesive political force at the end of World War II. All three groups went on to become major anti-colonial powers in southern Vietnam..

In Cochinchina, the communists also contended with a Trotskyist left opposition. In April 1939, the United Workers and Peasants coalition, led by the Trotskyist Tạ Thu Thâu, triumphed over both the stalinist's Democratic Front and the liberal Constitutionalists in elections to the colonial Cochinchina Council. Governor-General Brévié, who set the results aside, wrote to French Colonial Minister Mandel:

'"The Trotskyists under the leadership of Ta Thu Thau, want to take advantage of a possible war in order to win total liberation." The Stalinists, on the other hand, are "following the position of the Communist Party in France" and "will thus be loyal if war breaks out."

=== World War II and the Japanese occupation ===
==== Japanese occupation and March 1945 coup ====
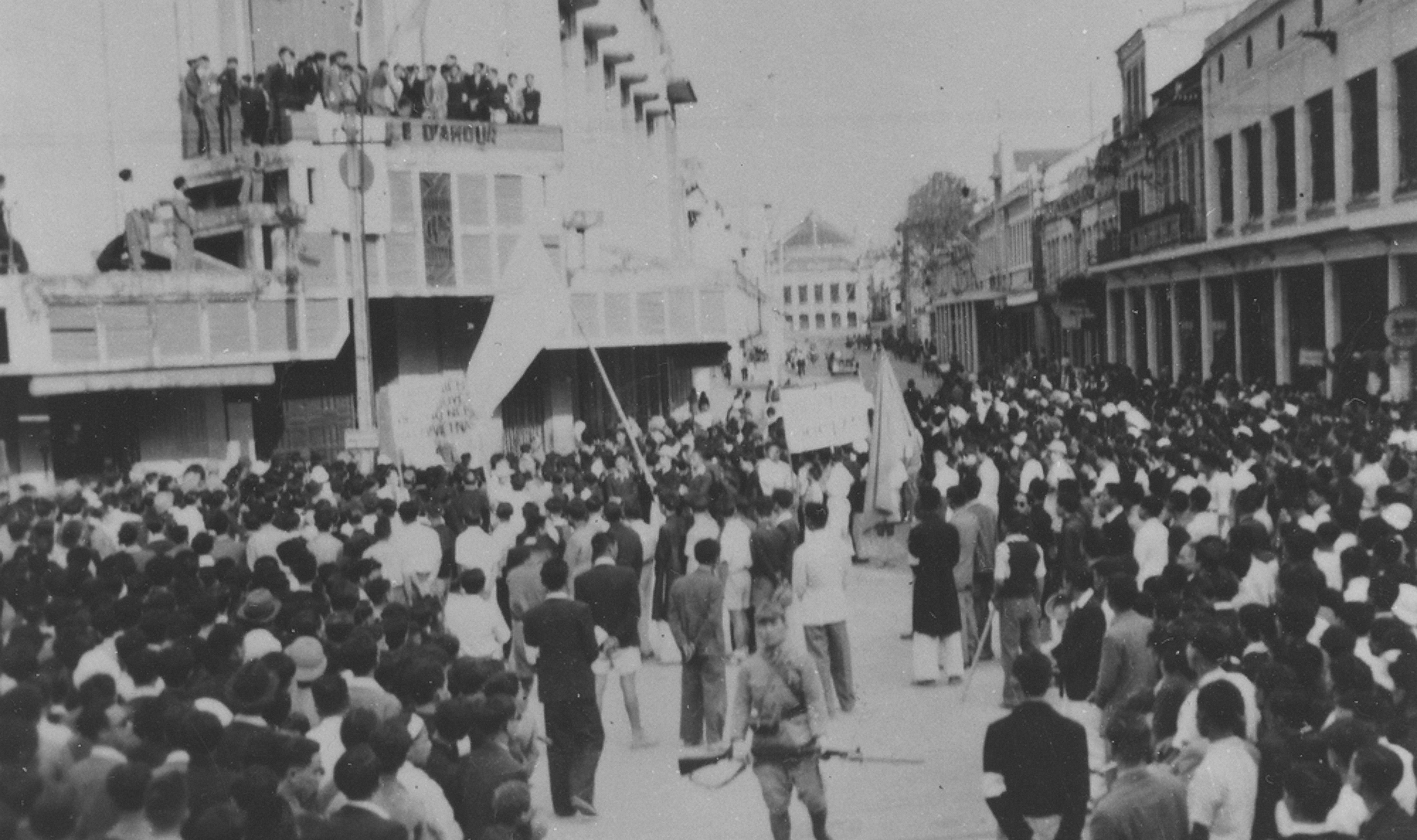
Hanoi after 9 March 1945

Before 1945, France and Japan had uneasily ruled Vietnam together for over four years. In September 1940, just months after France capitulated to Germany, Japanese troops took advantage of French weakness to station troops in northern Vietnam for the purpose of cutting off the supply route to the southern flank of the China Theatre. From 1940 to March 1945, the French retained their administrative responsibilities, police duties, and even their colonial army in exchange for allowing Japanese troops and material to pass through Indochina. By 1943, however, there were signs that the Japanese might lose the war. The United States had begun the island-hopping sweep through the South Pacific. A seaborne Allied landing in Indochina and an overland attack from China became real threats to the Japanese. In addition, an upsurge of Gaullist sentiment in Indochina after Charles de Gaulle returned to Paris at the head of the French Provisional Government in September 1944 added to Japanese concerns.

In the evening of 9 March 1945, the Japanese forces attacked the French in every center and removed the French from administrative control of Indochina. In less than 24 hours, the majority of the French armed forces throughout Indochina was put out of combat. The entire French colonial system, which had been in existence for almost 87 years, came tumbling down. Practically all French civil and military leaders were made prisoners, including Admiral Jean Decoux.

After the Japanese removed the French from administrative control in Indochina, they made no attempt to impose their own direct control of the civilian administration. Concerned primarily with the defense of Vietnam against an Allied invasion, the Japanese were not interested in Vietnamese politics although they also understood the desirability of a certain degree of administrative continuity. It was to their advantage to install a Vietnamese government that would acquiesce in the Japanese military presence. With that in mind, the Japanese persuaded the Vietnamese Nguyễn dynasty emperor, Bảo Đại, to co-operate with Japan and to declare Vietnam independent of France. On 11 March 1945, Bảo Đại did just that by abrogating the Franco-Vietnamese Treaty of Protectorate of 1884. In August, Vietnam regained Cochinchina (Southern Vietnam). Vietnam's new "independence," however, rested on the government's willingness to co-operate with Japan and accept the Japanese military presence.

==== Opportunity for Vietnamese nationalists ====
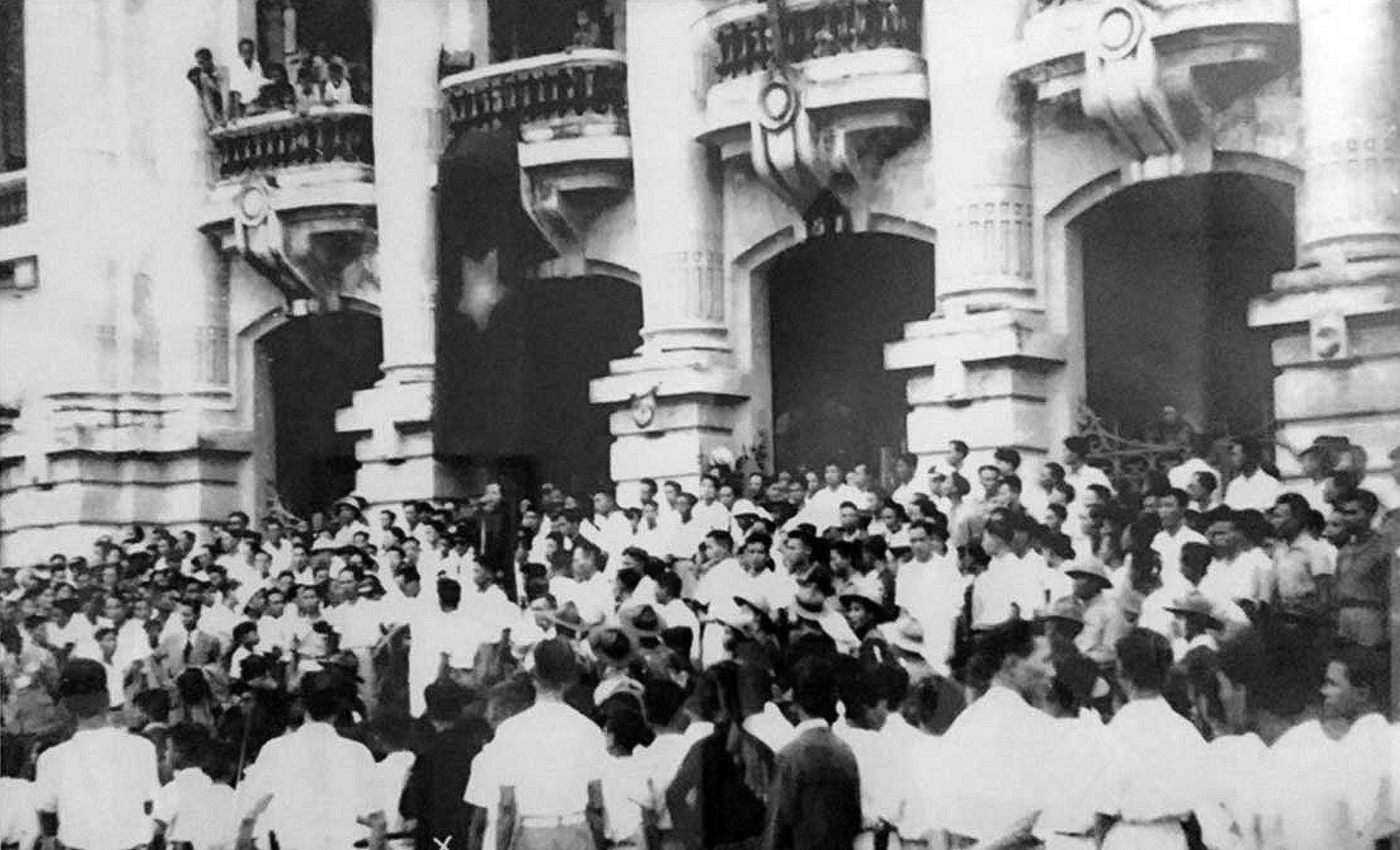
Meeting at the Grand Opera in Hanoi on 17 August 1945.

From March to August 1945, Vietnam was under the nominal rule of the Empire of Vietnam, backed by Japan. In the aftermath of the coup, the Japanese most definitely wanted to minimize internal change in Indochina, which would have adversely affected their military objectives.

If the 9 March coup was a disaster for the French, it was an opportunity for Vietnamese nationalists. In fact, it marked a turning point in the Vietnamese revolution. Freed from French repression, which had continued unabated in the early phase of the Japanese occupation, Vietnamese revolutionaries had much greater freedom of movement.

In May 1941, Ho Chi Minh formed the Viet Nam Doc Lap Dong Minh (League for the Independence of Vietnam), or Việt Minh for short, at the Eighth Plenum of the Indochinese Communist Party at Pác Bó in northern Vietnam. The Việt Minh encouraged the creation of "national salvation associations" and adopted guerrilla warfare as the cornerstone of its revolutionary strategy. After the coup, the Japanese were stretched thin and only control the large cities and left the countryside to the Vietnamese. The Việt Minh, in particular, took advantage of the situation to strengthen their power. During the five months of the Japanese interlude, the Việt Minh carried out propaganda activities and organizational work in the Vietnamese countryside to prepare for the anticipated popular insurrection.

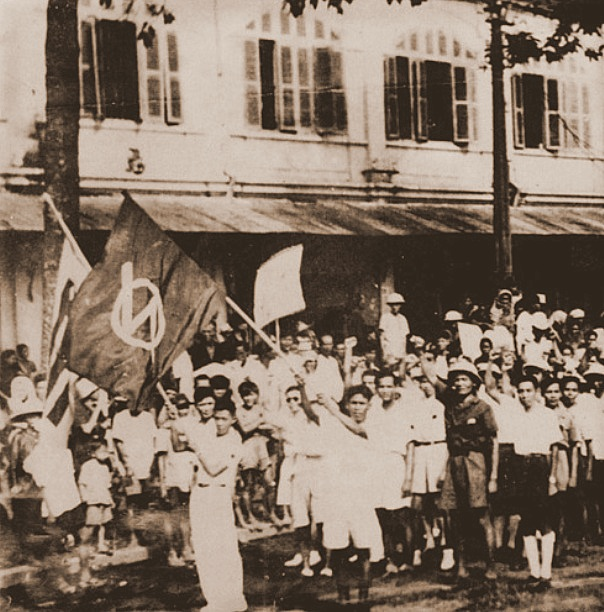
The Trotskyist League of Vietnam in Saigon, 21 August 1945

However, the Việt Minh was not the only political organization to anticipate an opportunity. In fact, after the brief storm of bullets of 9 March, various political parties, groups, and associations were formed throughout Vietnam. In the south, because of the weak status of the communist movement, the Việt Minh did not take full control of the movements' leadership during the preparation for insurrection. Several politico-religious organizations mentioned above rapidly expanded their power. In the early of summer 1945, Hòa Hảo leaders opened talks with the heads of other southern nationalist groups in the south, including the Cao Đài and the Trotskyists, to fight for and defend an independent Vietnam when the war ended. In mid-1945, the Đại Việt National Alliance was the most important nationalist revolutionary force in northern Vietnam.

The Trần Trọng Kim Cabinet oversaw the unification of the country for the first time in nearly a century. In its brief four-month existence, it sought to reverse decades of colonial rule by nationalising education, culture, and the civil service, while also doing its best to cope with the devastating famine. The Empire of Vietnam’s government might have survived despite its association with the Japanese, much like Sukarno and other nationalists managed to do in Indonesia.

==== Vietnamese famine of 1944–1945 ====
The famine of 1945 was another issue of utmost importance during the Japanese interlude. The famine was caused by both artificial and natural factors.

During the war, the Japanese had forced many rice farmers to grow other crops. As a result, rice production decreased, especially in the north, where crops had often been supplemented in the past by shipments from the south. Now, however, Japanese troops consumed the surplus from the south or converted it to fuel for military vehicles. Terrible flooding in the spring of 1945 added to the misery. Starving peasants flocked to the cities or died passively in the countryside.

The devastation contributed to the crisis of authority in the country. Neither the French nor the Japanese took effective measures to alleviate the famine, and Kim's government could do nothing without Japanese consent. The misery and anger combined to foster a new interest in politics, especially among the younger generation, which the Việt Minh turned to its advantage.

During the famine, the Việt Minh conducted raids on Japanese granaries and the rice storage facilities of Vietnamese landlords. In the long run, the Việt Minh thus increased popular support, highlighted the impotency of Kim's government and intensified popular feelings against the French and Japanese. The Việt Minh succeeded in creating People's Revolutionary Committees all over the north. The committees were to take over local administration when the Việt Minh launched the general insurrection.

== August Revolution ==
On August 13, 1945, upon receiving news that fascist Japan had been defeated and was about to surrender to the Allies, the ICP's Central Committee and the Viet Minh's General Headquarters established the National Uprising Committee. At 11 p.m. the same day, the Committee issued Military Order No. 1, calling for a general uprising. The following day, the ICP's National Conference opened at Tân Trào, where the Party resolved to promptly launch a general uprising to seize power. A National People’s Congress was also convened at Tân Trào on August 16. The Congress decided to establish the National Liberation Committee, with Hồ Chí Minh as Chairman.

Also on August 13, 1945, the Việt Nam Quốc Dân Đảng seized power in Hà Giang. When the Japanese surrendered to the Allies on 15 August 1945, the Việt Minh immediately launched the prepared general insurrection. 'People's Revolutionary Committees' across the countryside took over administrative positions, often acting on their own initiative, and in the cities, the Japanese stood by as the Vietnamese took control. On the morning of 19 August, the Việt Minh took control of Hanoi, seizing northern Vietnam in the next few days.

On August 25, Emperor Bảo Đại issued his abdication decree, and on August 30, he formally turned over the imperial seal and sword to the Việt Minh delegation in Hue, leading to the fall of the Nguyễn dynasty and Empire of Vietnam. He was then offered a position as supreme advisor. On 2 September, Ho Chi Minh declared independence for the newly established Democratic Republic of Vietnam in Hanoi, the exact same day Japan officially signed the Instrument of Surrender aboard the USS Missouri.

However, while the revolution succeeded rapidly in the north, the Việt Minh faced a more politically fragmented situation in the south. Establishing unified control proved more challenging due to intense competition among various factions, including the Việt Minh, the Cao Đài and Hòa Hảo religious movements, other nationalist groups, and Trotskyists.

On August 24, the Việt Minh established the Southern Administrative Committee in Saigon. The situation escalated rapidly with the impending arrival of British forces, sent to disarm the Japanese but widely perceived as paving the way for a French colonial restoration. In early September, factional rivalries culminated in armed clashes; notably in Cần Thơ on September 7–8, when the Southern Administrative Committee and the Vanguard Youth (Thanh Niên Tiền Phong) suppressed an armed march by rival opposition groups seeking to challenge Việt Minh authority.

In the north, Lê Trọng Nghĩa, who later became the head of the Intelligence Department for both the Communist Party and the military, said of events in Hanoi:

'The government did not hand over power or collapse, the Việt Minh made the decision to destroy what was there, the entire administration. We were bold. Approaching the Japanese, harnessing the energy around the popularity of the Democratic Party of Vietnam to influence the outcome of the people's uprising, and using our covert operatives within the puppet apparatus to collapse things within'.

=== Preparation and supply ===
In Hanoi on 15–20 April 1945 the Tonkin Revolutionary Military Conference of the Việt Minh issued a resolution that was reprinted on pages 1–4 on 25 August 1970 in the Nhân Dân journal. It called for a general uprising, resistance and guerilla warfare against the Japanese by establishing 7 war zones across Vietnam named after past heroes of Vietnam, calling for propaganda to explain to the people that their only way forward was violent resistance against the Japanese and exposing the Vietnamese puppet government that served them. The conference also called for training propagandists and having women spread military propaganda and target Japanese soldiers with Chinese language leaflets and Japanese language propaganda. The Việt Minh's Vietnamese Liberation Army published the "Resistance against Japan" (Kháng Nhật) newspaper. They also called for the creation of a group called "Chinese and Vietnamese Allied against Japan" by sending leaflets to recruit overseas Chinese in Vietnam to their cause. The resolution called on forcing the French in Vietnam to recognise Vietnamese independence and for Charles de Gaulle's France (Allied French) to recognise their independence and cooperate with them against Japan.

Archimedes Patti stated that when he arrived in Kunming in March 1945, the French colonials were either unwilling or unable to assist him in establishing an American intelligence network in Indochina and so he turned to "the only source [available]," the Việt Minh. Patti was introduced to Ho Chi Minh by Colonel Austin Glass, the OSS expert in Indochina. Patti met Ho Chi Minh on the French Indochinese-Chinese border in late April 1945. Patti agreed to provide intelligence to the allies if he could have "a line of communication with the allies."

On 16 July 1945, the American Office of Strategic Services (OSS) Special Operations Deer Team and 3 French special operatives arrived by parachute at the Việt Minh headquarters at Kim Lung. The remaining six members of the OSS Deer Team would arrive by parachute on 29 July. When the Deer Team arrived they were greeted by Võ Nguyên Giáp who apologised for their leader's absence as Ho Chi Minh was weak and dying suffering from "malaria, dengue fever, dysentery, or a combination of all three.", as OSS medic Paul Hoagland was a trained nurse he supplied Ho Chi Minh with the right medicine to let him recover from his illness. Though there is controversy if the Americans saved Ho Chi Minh from "an early grave" or if he would have recovered without their help.

In the first six days of August 1945 the OSS Deer Team built a training camp for the Việt Minh. This training camp consisted of 3 barracks with one being for the Việt Minh recruits, another one being for the OSS members, and another serving as a warehouse, infirmary, and radio centre. Chairman Ho referred to these barracks as the Bo Doi Viet-My, the Vietnamese-American Force. The Việt Minh supplied the OSS with 110 recruits of which the Deer Team would choose the 40 most promising to give special training instructing them how to use American weapons and drilling them like American soldiers from 9 to 15 August. More weapons and ammunition were dropped near them during the third OSS aid drop on 10 August. Võ Nguyên Giáp wanted to make sure that his newly equipped forces would be witnessed by as many people as possible showcasing them to people who would cheer them on and welcome them as liberators. By the time of the Japanese surrender OSS Major Alison Kent Thomas had already given most of his weapons to the Việt Minh's Vietnamese-American Force, which became an issue when he received a message from Kunming, China that he was to return all OSS equipment to an American base stationed in China. However, by the time Thomas received this message both the Việt Minh's Vietnamese-American Force and the OSS Deer Team were on the road to Hanoi to proclaim a revolution.

While in early August 1945 the end of the war still seemed far away, following the atomic bombings of Hiroshima and Nagasaki it would become clear that the Japanese were on the losing side and as American troops moved closer to the Japanese Mainland, Ho Chi Minh's sense of urgency would grow causing him to ramp up preparations in order to proclaim a swift and decisive revolution following the official surrender of Japan in order to take the country before the French could return. In order to retain his leadership he knew that he had to demonstrate both legitimacy and strength and quickly called for a meeting between the Việt Minh and other Vietnamese nationalist political figures, on 13 August many delegates met at Tan Trao where they established the National Insurrection Committee, its first order was to commence a general military insurrection on 14 August.

On 8 August 1945, Hanoi's political situation became more and more heated due to the upheavals of the Second World War. The Japanese army suffered one defeat after another on allied fronts. During that time, the Việt Minh leadership instructed to conduct secret contacts with Khâm sai Phan Kế Toại, who represented the Court of the Nguyễn dynasty in the North, asking him to side with the Việt Minh. Toại was puzzled by the Việt Minh's invitation to join their government.

According to later accounts the American government claimed that it only gave "a few revolvers" to the Việt Minh but according to author David Halberstam this is contradicted by "a considerable of evidence" suggesting that the Allied forces supplied the Việt Minh with 5,000 weapons during the summer of 1945. According to both Communist and French accounts the Việt Minh's military numbered only around 5,000 at the time of the fall of Japan. As 5,000 weapons would have been a highly significant amount American intelligence scholar Bob Bergin questioned Halberstam's claims as he provided no evidence, meanwhile Bergin estimated that perhaps only around 200 or so weapons had been given to the Việt Minh by the Americans during this period. Bergin noted that Ho Chi Minh learned from his own experiences that the Americans wouldn't supply him with a sufficient amount of weapons if he asked for them and that an insufficient supply of weapons had always plagued the Việt Minh. The weapons supplied to them were supposed to have been used by the Vietnamese-American Force if the war would have continued.

During an event known as "Gold Week", Ho Chi Minh asked the Vietnamese people to contribute their gold to the Việt Minh to be able to purchase more armaments from both the Imperial Japanese forces and Chiang's National Revolutionary Army, within only a short amount of time people "from all walks of life" had contributed 370 kilograms of gold and 20,000,000 piastres for the purchasing of weaponry. Historian Bernard B. Fall later commented on the success of "Gold Week" saying that the Vietnam People's Army was able to purchase 3,000 rifles, 50 automatic rifles, 600 submachine guns, and 100 mortars of American manufacture. According to Fall the Vietnam People's Army also secured substantial French and Japanese stocks of firearms and other military equipment (31,000 rifles, 700 automatic weapons, 36 artillery pieces, and 18 tanks) which were supposed to have been secured by the Chinese after the surrender of Japan, but were unable to.

=== Initial stages of the revolution ===
On 16 August the first National People's Congress was formed and it consisted of delegates from all the different political parties that formed the Việt Minh, the first National People's Congress included various mass organisations and representatives of different ethnic groups and religious groups. During the meeting the attendees were greeted by disciplined soldiers well-armed in uniform and at building photographs of Claire Lee Chennault were prominently displayed next to portraits of Bolshevik leader Vladimir Lenin and the Chinese Communist Mao Zedong indicating that the Việt Minh enjoyed "secret" support from the Allies. During the meeting Ho Chi Minh emphasised that for the revolution to be successful they would rapidly need to take power in order to be able to provide strong opposition when the Allied forces will occupy French Indochina. 3 days later the Việt Minh would successfully take Hanoi and most of northern Vietnam.

When OSS Indochina operations chief Archimedes Patti arrived in Hanoi on 21 August with an OSS team, and accompanied by a five-man French military team to handle prisoner-of-war (POW) matters, he was shocked to see the situation in Hanoi. Patti soon found himself having to calm down the French and was worried that the demonstrations in Hanoi could soon turn into bloody situations. Patti radioed the American military base in Kunming telling them to persuade the OSS Deer Team and the 3 OSS Special Operations teams in northern Tonkin to return to Kunming as soon as possible and that no further help should be given to the Việt Minh. Archimedes Patti hoped to quickly distance the Americans from both the French and the Việt Minh to avoid getting involved in the internal struggles going on Vietnam. However, this was already too late as the Deer Team at this point was already fighting alongside the Việt Minh against the Japanese.

From 20 to 25 August the Việt Minh engaged in the Battle of Thái Nguyên against the Japanese. Earlier on 16 August 1945 the OSS Deer Team had joined the Việt Minh despite Major Thomas having received clear orders to "sit tight until further orders" from the OSS. While the reasons for the battle of Thái Nguyên remain unclear, Bob Bergin speculates that the Indochinese Communist Party (ICP) leaders wanted to test the combat capabilities of the Vietnamese-American Joint Force and that they had hoped for an easy victory that would both psychologically and politically reenforce the legitimacy and strength of the Việt Minh. According to American historian Douglas Pike, the battle of Thái Nguyên was the event that officially "marked the liberation of Vietnam". During the battle itself only sporadic fighting broke out, as the Japanese were situated in an old French fort and the Americans were all, except for Major Thomas, away from the battle in an outside safehouse. On 25 August the final battle at Thái Nguyên ended with the Japanese "surrendering" agreeing to stay confined to their post. This marked the liberation of the city of Thái Nguyên from Japanese rule, after the battle ended Thái Nguyên erupted in celebrations and held an independence parade. From this point onwards the Americans completely disassociated themselves from engaging in the August Revolution.

=== Hanoi uprising ===
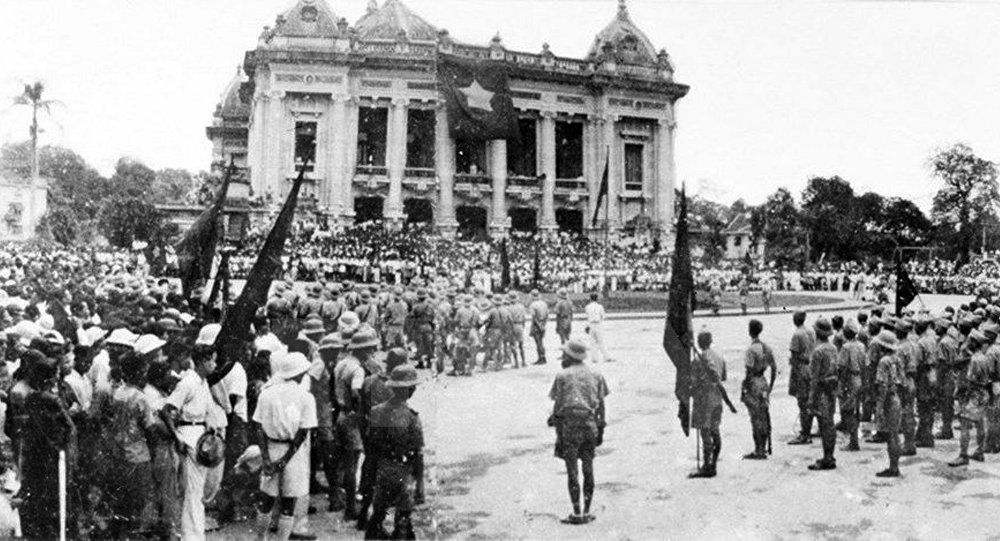
A pro-Việt Minh rally and parade in front of the Hanoi Opera House on 30 August 1945.

In a telegram sent to Tokyo, the Japanese ambassador to Indochina in Hanoi confirmed: "On the afternoon of the 19th, the Ambassador was 'invited' to attend a meeting with the leaders of Etsumei (Việt Minh) and participated in discussions with them, considered as official authorities."

=== Events in Huế ===
According to Nguyễn Kỳ Nam on 12 August 1945 a Japanese general entered the city of Huế and asked to meet with the Minister of Justice Trịnh Đình Thảo saying that there were urgent and confidential matters. At that time, the journalist Nguyễn Kỳ Nam was present because he was General Manager of the Ministry of Justice office in Huế of the Trần Trọng Kim cabinet. He informed the minister that he had come from Saigon, Cochinchina to ask for an audience with the Emperor to ask for permission to deal with the Việt Minh's uprising.

On 17 August 1945, the government of Trần Trọng Kim held a national rally, but because of the support of the people, the rally turned into a march in support of the Việt Minh forces. As the imperial government of Vietnam saw the success of the August Revolution minister Trần Đình Nam suggested to Trần Trọng Kim to dissolve the government in favour of the Việt Minh in solidarity around the strongest and most enthusiastic organisation noting that this would disallow foreigners to play "divide and conquer" in Vietnam. Among his suggestions was not just to dissolve the cabinet but to abolish the Nguyễn dynasty altogether and ask for the Emperor to abdicate, in response Trần Trọng Kim got furious at Trần Đình Nam for daring to suggest that the Emperor should relinquish his position causing a heated debate between the two men.

On 23 August, the Việt Minh-led uprising in Huế won. The people directing the uprising were Nguyễn Chí Thanh and Tố Hữu. The uprising was contributed by the Frontline Youth (Thanh niên tiền tuyến, also known as the Thanh niên Phan Anh), which was originally the policing department of Trần Trọng Kim's government but when the revolution broke out, it turned to support the Việt Minh.

=== Events in Cochinchina ===
In Saigon-Cholon, the important symbolic act of the transfer of power was Field Marshal Count Hisaichi Terauchi's pledge on 22 August to Trần Văn Giàu and Phạm Ngọc Thạch – two senior representatives of the Việt Minh – that the Japanese would not intervene if the Việt Minh seized power. Terauchi also handed over his personal sword (Wakizashi) and personal gun to Việt Minh representatives as a symbolic act.

When the British entered southern French Indochina after the surrender of Japan they became politically involved and imposed martial law in order to keep anti-colonial forces under control.

=== Abdication of Emperor Bảo Đại ===
The telegram sent by Un comité de patriotes représentant tous les partis et toutes les couches de la population set an ultimatum of 12 hours for Bảo Đại to abdicate, otherwise they couldn't guarantee that he or his family would survive the August Revolution. Bảo Đại claimed that he had attempted to contact the American President Harry S. Truman, Generalissimo Chiang Kai-Shek, King George VI, and General Charles de Gaulle for help but that none of them answered. A young tutor of Crown Prince Nguyễn Phúc Bảo Long begged for Bảo Đại to take shelter in the Imperial Tomb but he refused. Bảo Đại later received a second telegram from Hanoi asking for his abdication.

It is not known who convinced Emperor Bảo Đại to abdicate, as it might have been Huỳnh Thúc Kháng or Phạm Khắc Hòe. The latter drew a comparison with this situation and the fate of King Louis XVI of France. A French military force entitled "Lambda" consisting of 6 men led by the French captain Castelnat parachuted 28 kilometers from Huế in order to try to prevent Emperor Bảo Đại from abdicating. However, they were captured by the Việt Minh as soon as their parachutes hit the ground.

The abdication of Emperor Bảo Đại was officially announced on 25 August 1945. The imperial edict ending the Nguyễn dynasty was composed by Emperor Bảo Đại with the help of Prince Nguyễn Phúc Vĩnh Cẩn on the night of 22 August 1945 at the Kien Trung palace within the Citadel of Huế. The next morning, when the representatives of the Provisional Revolutionary Government of the Democratic Republic of Vietnam Trần Huy Liệu and Cù Huy Cận came to the palace to receive the documents of resignation, Emperor Bảo Đại at first gave the declaration to Trần Huy Liệu, but Liệu then convinced the Emperor to hold a formal ceremony announcing his abdication.

Together with his edict declaring his abdication, Emperor Bảo Đại also promulgated an edict which was directed at the imperial family of the Nguyễn dynasty, reminding them of his attachment to the dân vi qúi philosophy and of his vow that he would rather be only a citizen of an independent country than the puppet ruler of an enslaved country. He called on the members of the imperial family to support the government of the Democratic Republic of Vietnam and that they should also work to preserve Vietnam's independence. Both of these edicts made it clear that Emperor Bảo Đại's will to step aside on behalf of the new government in Hanoi. The edicts also contained the notion that he was unambiguously transmitting his mandate voluntarily rather than under any form of coercion.

As a part of his official abdication, Emperor Bảo Đại personally gave his regalia to representatives of the government of the Democratic Republic of Vietnam in ceremony. In this ceremony he handed over the Hoàng Đế chi bảo (皇帝之寶) seal weighing around 10 kilograms and the jade-encrusted silver sword (An dân bảo kiếm, known as the "Sword of the State") to the Communist government. The passing of the ceremonial seal and sword had been seen as symbolically "passing the Mandate of Heaven over to the government of the Democratic Republic of Vietnam".

The August Revolution was proclaimed to be successful, on 25 August 1945, President Ho Chi Minh together with the Central Committee of the Communist Party (Trung ương Đảng) and the National Committee for the Liberation of the People (Ủy ban Dân tộc giải phóng) returned to Hanoi. The abdication of Emperor Bảo Đại further symbolised the end of the military government and the beginning of a civilian government for the Democratic Republic of Vietnam.

It is said that during the ceremony the Bảo Đại Emperor said that he would rather "be a citizen of a free country than the Emperor of an enslaved country". At the end of the abdication ceremony it is reported that the crowd loudly exclaimed "Việt Nam độc lập muôn năm!", "Việt Nam Dân chủ Cộng hòa muôn năm!" (Ten thousand years to an independent Vietnam! Ten-thousand years to the Democratic Republic of Vietnam!).

On the afternoon of 27 August and the morning of 28 August 1945, Phạm Khắc Hòe had an inventory of assets in the imperial Citadel to hand over to the Revolutionary Government of the Democratic Republic of Vietnam. The most valuable items were the historical pearl and ivory objects of the Nguyễn Emperors. These were stored in a large tunnel behind the Palace of Heavenly Purity. Phạm Khắc Hòe would organise the handover ceremony that was to be held on 30 August 1945.

Following his abdication former Emperor Bảo Đại accepted President Ho Chi Minh's offer to become an advisor to the new Vietnamese government in Hanoi. Ho Chi Minh gave him the title of Conseiller suprême du gouvernement (Supreme-councilor of the government), but Bảo Đại understood that this position was one that could have easily resulted in his death if he ever stepped out of line. President Ho Chi Minh hoped that he could make Bảo Đại into the "Souphanouvong of Vietnam" but failed.

=== Events in Saigon aftermath ===
On 2 September 1945, thousands of people from many provinces and in Saigon flocked to Norodom Square (near the Notre Dame Cathedral), waiting to hear President Ho Chi Minh read the Declaration of Independence in Hanoi. However, due to the bad weather and simple technology at that time, Ho Chi Minh's proclamations to the nation did not reach the people attending the rally. Trần Văn Giàu, Chairman of the Administrative Committee of Cochinchina, stepped on the stage to call on the people to unite around Ho Chi Minh's government, and raise vigilance against the colonisers in case they return to invade Vietnam again. The rally soon turned into an anti-French protest, in response the French started shooting at the protestors killing 47 and injuring more.

In Saigon, the brutal reassertion of French authority under the protection of British, British-Indian and British-commandeered Japanese, forces triggered a general uprising on 23 September. But the various militias were not only hit hard by the newly disembarked French forces, as they fell back into the countryside they were also assailed by the Việt Minh, who hunted down and executed their leaders (among their victims, the Trotskyists Tạ Thu Thâu and Phan Văn Hùm).

== Aftermath ==
=== Allied occupation and Việt Minh consolidation ===
Just as Ho Chi Minh and the Việt Minh had begun to extend DRV control to all of Vietnam, the attention of his new government was shifting from internal matters to the arrival of Allied troops. At the Potsdam Conference in July 1945, the Allies divided Indochina into two zones at the 16th parallel, attaching the southern zone to the Southeast Asia command and leaving the northern part to Chiang Kai-shek's Republic of China to accept the surrender of the Japanese.

The occupation period proved to be a great challenge for Ho Chi Minh and the ICP. When British forces from the Southeast Asia Command arrived in Saigon on 13 September, they brought along a detachment of French troops. The acquiescence of British occupation forces in the south allowed the French to move rapidly to reassert control over the south of the country, where its economic interests were strongest, DRV authority was weakest and colonial forces were the most deeply entrenched.

However, in the north, the occupation period became the critical opportunity for the Việt Minh to consolidate and triumph over domestic rivals. On 20 August, Chiang Kai-shek gave orders for the Chinese First Front Army, under the command of General Lu Han of Yunnan, to cross into Vietnam to accept the surrender of the Japanese 38th Army. The Chinese, unlike the British in the south, refused to prepare the way for an immediate French return; to maintain order in Hanoi and keep the city functioning, they allowed the Vietnamese Provisional Government to remain in control. With that breathing space, Ho Chi Minh was able to maneuver against and then to eliminate his domestic rivals, thus strengthening Việt Minh control over northern Vietnamese provinces.

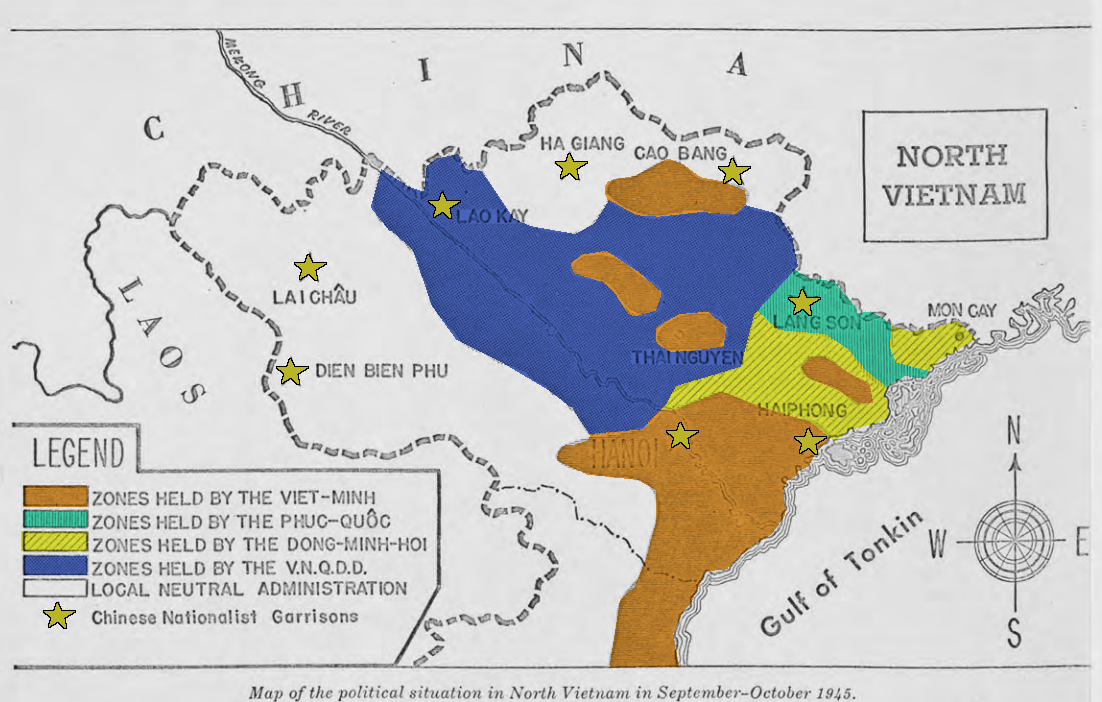
Map of the political situation in Northern Vietnam (Tonkin), highlighting different parties in September–October 1945.

=== Entry of Chinese troops into northern Vietnam ===
General Lu Han's 200,000 Chinese soldiers occupied north Vietnam starting August 1945. 90,000 arrived by October, the 62nd army came on 26 September to Nam Dinh and Haiphong. Lang Son and Cao Bang were occupied by the Guangxi 62nd army corps and the red river region and Lai Cai were occupied by a column from Yunnan.

Vietnamese Kuomintang fighters accompanied the Chinese soldiers. Ho Chi Minh ordered his DRV administration to set quotas for rice to give to the Chinese soldiers and rice was sold in Chinese currency in the red River delta. Lu Han occupied the Tonkin Palace after ejecting the French staff under Sainteny.

Chinese soldiers occupied Indochina north of the 16th parallel while the British under the South-East Asia Command of Lord Mountbatten occupied the south. Chiang Kai-shek deliberately withheld his crack and well trained soldiers from occupying Vietnam since he was going to use them to fight the Communists inside China and instead sent undisciplined warlord troops from Yunnan under Lu Han to occupy northern Vietnam and Hanoi.

The provisional government acquiesce gold taels, jewellery and coins in September 1945 during "Gold Week" to give to Chinese forces. Rice to Cochinchina by the French in October 1945 were divided by Ho Chi Minh, and the northern Vietnamese only received one third while the Chinese soldiers were given two thirds by the government.

For 15 days, elections were postponed in response to a demand by Chinese general Chen Xiuhe on 18 December so that the Chinese could get the Dong Minh Hoi and Vietnamese Kuomintang to prepare. The Chinese left only in April–June 1946. Ho Chi Minh gave golden smoking paraphernalia and a golden opium pipe to the Chinese general Lu Han after gold week and purchased weapons with what was left of the proceeds.

Starving Vietnamese were dying throughout northern Vietnam in 1945 due to the Japanese seizure of their crops by the time the Chinese came to disarm the Japanese and Vietnamese corpses were all throughout the streets of Hanoi and had to be cleaned up by workers and students. While Chiang Kai-shek, Xiao Wen (Hsiao Wen) and the Kuomintang central government of China was disinterested in occupying Vietnam beyond the allotted time period and involving itself in the war between the Viet Minh and the French, the Yunnan warlord Lu Han held the opposite view and wanted to occupy Vietnam to prevent the French returning and establish a Chinese trusteeship of Vietnam under the principles of the Atlantic Charter with the aim of eventually preparing Vietnam for independence and blocking the French from returning.

On October 17, 1945, Ho Chi Minh dispatched a critical cable to American President Harry S. Truman, urgently appealing to the Allied leaders, including Generalissimo Chiang Kai-shek, Premier Joseph Stalin, and Prime Minister Clement Attlee, to intervene through the newly formed United Nations. In his message, Ho Chi Minh vehemently opposed the reinstatement of French colonial rule, arguing that France had forfeited all rights to Indochina after surrendering the territory to Japan. He accused the French of betraying and deceiving the Allied cause, demanding that the United Nations bar them from reoccupying Vietnam.

Although Ho Chi Minh himself was forced to sign the March 1946 accord permitting the return of French troops to Vietnam, he strategically deflected the political fallout onto rival nationalist factions, specifically the Dong Minh Hoi and the Vietnamese Kuomintang. By casting blame on these groups, he sought to insulate his own government from public backlash over the concession to France.

Ho Chi Minh's Viet Minh tried to organize welcome parades for Chinese soldiers in northern Vietnam and covered for instances of bad behavior by warlord soldiers, trying to reassure the people that the warlord troops of Lu Han were only there temporarily and that China supported Vietnam's independence. Viet Minh publications actively sought to foster solidarity by highlighting the deep cultural and ancestral ties shared between the Vietnamese and Chinese peoples. They praised China's heroic resistance against Japanese aggression and celebrated the legacy of the 1911 Revolution, arguing that China's own struggles against Western imperialism proved that the modern neighbor was entirely distinct from the oppressive, feudal regimes of its dynastic past.

Seeking to avoid conflict with Chinese forces, Ho Chi Minh prohibited commanders like Trần Huy Liệu from engaging them. Following the March 6, 1946, Ro Nha incident in Kiến An, he went so far as to hand over the responsible Vietnamese soldiers for execution after DRV commissioners Hồ Đức Thành and Đào Văn Biểu investigated the case.

Ho Chi Minh appeased and granted numerous concessions to the Chinese soldiers to avoid the possibility of them clashing with the Viet Minh, with him ordering Vietnamese not to carry out anything against Chinese soldiers and pledging his life on his promise, hoping the Chinese would disarm the Japanese soldiers and finish their mission as fast as possible.

Chinese communist guerilla leader Chu Chia-pi came into northern Vietnam multiple times in 1945 and 1948 and helped the Viet Minh fight against the French from Yunnan. Other Chinese Communists, including general Chen Geng, also did the same.

=== French war crimes after the revolution ===
Upon their return in August 1945, French soldiers in Saigon robbed, raped, and killed Vietnamese civilians. Vietnamese women were also subjected to similar acts in the north by French forces like in Bảo Hà and Phu Lu which drove 400 French-trained Vietnamese soldiers to defect on June 20, 1948. Following the counter-insurgency campaigns of 1947–1948, the Việt Minh slipped across the border into Yunnan, China, to seek communist sanctuary, French forces systematically looted Buddhist temples and subjected local populations to torture and violence. The pervasive nature of these transgressions was captured by a French reporter, who was told by village elders: 'We know what war always is... We understand your soldiers taking our animals, our jewellery, our Buddhas... We are resigned to their raping our wives and our daughters... But we object to being treated in the same way, not only our sons, but ourselves, old men and dignitaries that we are.' Ultimately, the profound trauma left many of the victims psychologically devastated."

=== 6 March Franco-Vietnamese Accord ===
As southern Vietnam's disunited resistance forces struggled to push back French advances, Ho Chi Minh and the DRV started to negotiate with France in the hope of preserving national independence and to avoid war. In March 1946, the two sides reached an accord.

Instead of obtaining French recognition of Vietnamese "independence," Ho Chi Minh agreed to the status of a "free state" within the Indochinese Federation under the French Union. For their part, the French agreed to two provisions that they had no intention of honouring. French troops north of the 16th parallel were limited to 15,000 men for a period of five years, and a referendum was to be held on the issue of unifying the Vietnamese regions. The agreement entangled the French and Vietnamese in joint military operations and fruitless negotiations for several months.

However, the status of southern Vietnam was the sticking point. The March accord, which called for a referendum to determine whether the south would rejoin the rest of the country or remain a separate French territory, left the fate of Cochinchina in flux.

=== First Indochina War ===
The preliminary accord was but the first step toward an intended overall and lasting agreement. Southern Vietnam's future political status had to be negotiated. From June to September 1946, official negotiations between the DRV and France continued. While the Vietnamese delegation, led by Phạm Văn Đồng, directly engaged in the rigorous and ultimately deadlocked talks over the status of southern Vietnam, Ho Chi Minh traveled to Paris concurrently as an official guest of the French government. Unfortunately, almost immediately after the signing of the 6 March accord, relations began to deteriorate. Following the breakdown of the formal conference, Ho Chi Minh directly negotiated and signed the Modus Vivendi (Temporary Accord) of 14 September 1946 with French Minister of Overseas France Marius Moutet to temporarily preserve a fragile peace. The negotiations at Dalat and Fontainebleau ultimately collapsed due to unresolved disputes over the political status of southern Vietnam. With diplomatic avenues exhausted, both sides began mobilizing for a military solution. Provocations by both French and DRV troops led to the outbreak of full-scale war on 19 December 1946. Nearly a year and a half after the revolution, the DRV and France were fighting the First Indochina War.

== In popular culture ==
Sao tháng Tám ("Star of August") is a 1976 Vietnamese movie dramatized a rebellion in Hanoi during the August Revolution.

== See also ==
- French Indochina in World War II
- Political organizations and armed forces in Vietnam
- Indochina wars
- National Liberation Committee of Vietnam

== Bibliography ==
- Bảo Đại, Con Rồng Việt Nam [Bảo Đại, Dragon of Vietnam] (in Vietnamese). Nguyễn Phước Tộc Xuất Bản. 1990. Translated from Le dragon d'Annam, Bao Dai, Plon, 1980. (in French).
- Mark, Bradley (1999). "Making Revolutionary Nationalism: Vietnam, America and the August Revolution of 1945". Itinerario. 23: 23–51. doi:10.1017/S0165115300005416. S2CID 162303337.
- Marr, David G. (1995). Vietnam 1945: The Quest for Power. University of California Press. doi:10.1525/9780520920392. ISBN 9780520078338. (Paperback 1997)
- Marr, David G. (2013). Vietnam: State, War, and Revolution (1945–1946). University of California Press. ISBN 9780520274150. Archived from the original on 22 August 2022.
- Tønnesson, Stein (1991). The Vietnamese Revolution of 1945: Roosevelt, Ho Chi Minh and de Gaulle in a World at War. SAGE Publishing. ISBN 9780803985216. Archived from the original on 11 August 2022.
- Tønnesson, Stein (2009). Vietnam 1946: How the War Began. University of California Press. ISBN 9780520256026. Archived from the original on 22 August 2022.
- Tønnesson, Stein (2024). "The August Revolution of 1945". In Miller, Edward (ed.). The Cambridge History of the Vietnam War, Volume I: Origins. Cambridge University Press. doi:10.1017/9781316225240.008. ISBN 9781316225240.
- Patti, Archimedes L. A. Why Viet Nam?: Prelude to America's Albatross.
- Duiker, William J. Ho Chi Minh: A Life.
- Duiker, William J. (1981). The Communist road to power in Vietnam. Boulder: Westview Press. ISBN 978-0-89158-794-1. Archived from the original on 9 August 2021.
- Duiker, William J. (1983). Vietnam: Nation in Revolution. Westview Press: Frederick A. Praeger. ISBN 978-0-86531-336-1.
- Goscha, Christopher (2016). Vietnam: A New History. Basic Books. ISBN 9780465094370.
- Taylor, K. W. (2013). A History of the Vietnamese. Cambridge, UK: Cambridge University Press. ISBN 978-0-521-87586-8. Archived from the original on 20 May 2021.
- Worthing, Peter (2001). Occupation and Revolution; China and the Vietnamese August Revolution of 1945. Berkeley, California: Institution of East Asian Studies University of California Berkeley. ISBN 978-1-55729-072-4. Archived from the original on 9 August 2021.
- Chapman, Jessica M. (2013). Cauldron of Resistance: Ngo Dinh Diem, the United States, and 1950s Southern Vietnam. Ithaca, New York: Cornell University Press. ISBN 978-0-8014-5061-7.
- Lockard, Craig A. (2009). Southeast Asia World History. New York: Oxford University Press. ISBN 978-0-19-516075-8.
- Shaplen, Robert (1966). The Lost Revolution:Vietnam 1945-1965. Worcester, and London: The Trinity Press. Archived from the original on 21 August 2022.
- Huynh, Kim Khanh (August 1971). "Vietnamese August Revolution Reinterpreted". Journal of Asian Studies. 30 (4). Archived from the original on 18 March 2021.
- Zinoman, Peter (February 2000). "Colonial Prisons and Anti-Colonial Resistance in French Indochina: The Thai Nguyen Rebellion, 1917". Modern Asian Studies. 34 (1). Modern Asian Studies: 57–98. doi:10.1017/S0026749X00003590. JSTOR 313112. S2CID 145191678.
- McAlster, John T. Jr. (1966). Vietnam: The Origins of Revolution.
- Morris, Virginia; Hills, Clive (2018). Ho Chi Minh's Blueprint for Revolution: In the Words of Vietnamese Strategists and Operatives. McFarland & Co Inc.
- Vu, Tuong (2010). Paths to Development in Asia: South Korea, Vietnam, China, and Indonesia. Cambridge University Press. doi:10.1017/CBO9780511770876. ISBN 9780824892111.
- Vu, Tuong (2014). "Triumphs or tragedies: A new perspective on the Vietnamese revolution". Journal of Southeast Asian Studies. 45 (2): 236–257. doi:10.1017/S0022463414000083. S2CID 9900227.
