= Battle of Thái Nguyên =

Battle between communist Việt Minh and Japanese during August Revolution

- Part of the August Revolution
- Location of Thái Nguyên
Date	17–25 August 1945
Location	Thái Nguyên province, Tonkin, Empire of Vietnam
Result	Japanese agreed to stay confined to their post: The Viet Minh established their government in Thái Nguyên on August 28; Imperial guards surrendered and disbanded

Belligerents
Empire of Japan; Empire of Vietnam	Viet Minh; United States (supporting role)

Commanders and leaders
Unknown; Bùi Huy Lượng (POW); Cung Đình Vận	Võ Nguyên Giáp; Đàm Quang Trung; Major Alison Kent Thomas

Units involved
Japanese Tonkin units Imperial Guards	Viet Minh Liberation Army; Viet Minh-OSS detachment

Strength
Around 120 Japanese; 400 Imperial guards 100 police	Unknown

Casualties and losses
6 killed	3 killed
- 5 civilians killed

The Battle of Thái Nguyên, fought in Thái Nguyên province, was the small and only battle of the August Revolution, between the communist Viet Minh, with minimal assistance from the U.S. Office of Strategic Services, and the Empire of Japan. The battle lasted from 17 to 25 August 1945.

== Battle ==
On 16 August 1945, the Viet Minh liberation army and the OSS Deer Team detachment led by Võ Nguyên Giáp entered Thái Nguyên.

At 4:00 a.m, 20 August, the Liberation Army surrounded the town. By 5:30 a.m, polices and imperial guards had surrendered their weapons; the Đồng Hỷ district governor and the commander of the imperial guards subsequently surrendered as well. . The Liberation Army Command sent an ultimatum to provincial governor Bùi Huy Lượng, but he did not reply. The governor was captured, and the Viet Minh established a government in this province on 28 August 1945.

During the battle itself, only sporadic fighting broke out, as a small group of Japanese army was situated in an old French fort and the Americans were all, except for Major Thomas, away from the battle in an outside safehouse. On 25 August the final battle at Thái Nguyên ended with the Japanese "surrendering" agreeing to stay confined to their post, the same day the Empire of Vietnam (Japan's puppet) collapsed when its emperor Bảo Đại abdicated. The government apparatus of the Empire of Vietnam in Thái Nguyên collapsed and its soldiers (lính bảo an) here automatically surrendered to the Viet Minh.

According to Thomas, the battle resulted in the deaths of six Japanese, three Viet Minh fighters and five civilians. After the battle, the Viet Minh (de facto led by communists) completely seized Thái Nguyên when Giáp founded the People's Revolutionary Committee in the province.

== See also ==
- People's Army of Vietnam
- First Indochina War
- Sino-Vietnamese conflicts (1945-1946)
