= Archimedes Patti =

United States Army officer and OSS officer

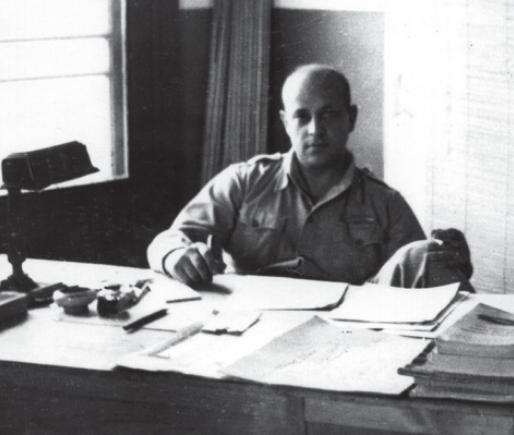
- OSS Maj. Archimedes Patti in his Kunming Office, May 1945
- Born: Archimedes Leonidas Attilio Patti; July 21, 1913; Bronx, New York City, U.S.
- Died: April 23, 1998 (aged 84); Winter Park, Florida, U.S.
- Burial place: Arlington National Cemetery
- Military career
- Allegiance: United States
- Branch: United States Army
- Service years: 1941–1957
- Rank: Lieutenant colonel
- Unit: Office of Strategic Services
- Wars: World War II

Archimedes Leonidas Attilio Patti (July 21, 1913 – April 23, 1998) was a lieutenant colonel in the United States Army and an Office of Strategic Services officer who headed operations in Kunming and Hanoi in 1945 when he was a Major. (Note: "This [village near Jingxi city, Baise prefecture, Guangxi province, China, near Cao Bằng province, Vietnam] was where Ho had his first meeting with Major Archimedes Patti, Chief of the OSS in Indochina; the two men met again in autumn 1945—but this time in Hanoi.") (Note: "The full group consisted of thirteen OSS officers and enlisted men under Maj. Archimedes L. A. Patti and five French officers, including Sainteny.") (Note: "The man in charge of the American Mission to Hanoi was Capt. Archimedes Patti, whose team was greeted with the same warmth and respect that had been accorded the Deer Team earlier." So was Patti Captain or Major when he arrived in Hanoi in 1945? See Notes on Vietnam History for more extensive references and analysis on this issue.) Patti is known for having worked closely with Hồ Chí Minh and the Việt Minh, this before (Note: On 1945 Aug 26, Ho Chi Minh arrived in Hanoi, invited Patti for lunch, and expressed his concerns about the French and the Chinese in Tonkin. "Patti listened intently. He had met with Ho Chi Minh once before, in April 1945, in southern China, on the subject of potential OSS–Viet Minh cooperation in the struggle against Japan.") and after (Note: Ho Chi Minh became President of the Provisional Government of the Democratic Republic of Vietnam (DRV) on August 28, 1945, or 29, and Patti left Hanoi on October 1, 1945 "after sharing one last dinner with Ho Chi Minh.") Ho became President of the Provisional Government of the Democratic Republic of Vietnam in 1945.

== Early life ==
Patti was born in The Bronx, New York City, on July 21, 1913, to Sicilian immigrants. His father worked as a tailor, his mother as dress maker.

He was married to Margaret Telford. They had two daughters.

== Career ==
The 1940 U.S. census lists Patti's profession as "Special Agent, U.S. War Department." In 1941, he joined the United States Army and served in Europe, where he was in contact with various anti-Axis resistance organizations including groups in North Africa, Italy, and Yugoslavia.

He was later transferred to the Office of Strategic Services in China after he had unknowingly volunteered for the mission in January 1944 on an assignment at Anzio with OSS Director William J. Donovan.

=== Vietnam ===
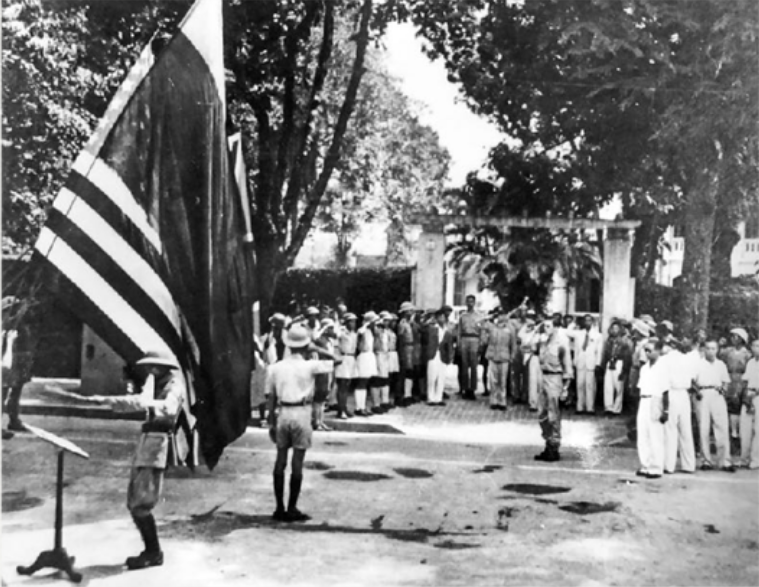
OSS Maj. Archimedes Patti and Võ Nguyên Giáp saluted American flag, with a Viet Minh band playing the Star Spangled Banner, 1945 Aug 26, Sunday

During his career in China and Southeast Asia, Patti met Hồ Chí Minh, leader of the Việt Minh. In later interviews, Patti explained that his mission in Vietnam was to establish an intelligence network but not to assist the French in any way in their attempt to regain control over their former colony, a policy choice that he believed to be linked to U.S. President Franklin D. Roosevelt's belief in the self-determination of all peoples.

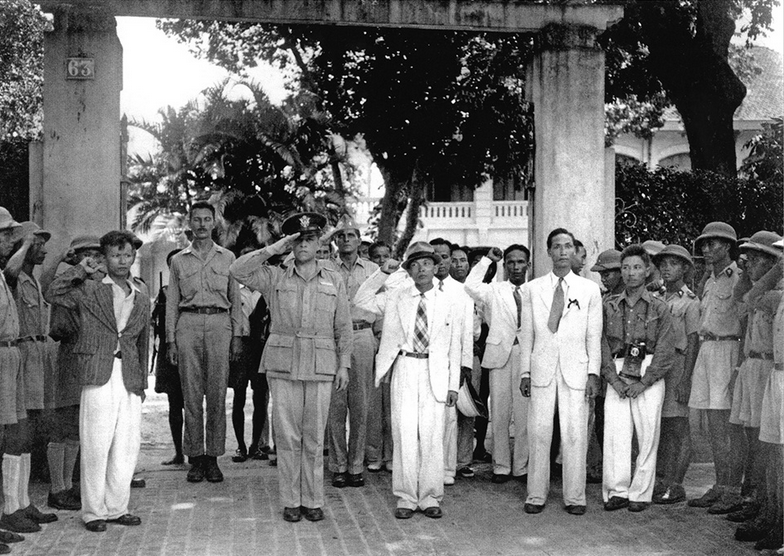
Võ Nguyên Giáp gave a welcoming parade to US Maj. Archimedes Patti, head of the US Army intelligence team (OSS), 1945 Aug 26, Sunday.

However, Patti, from a distance, helped to organize, train, and equip the fledgling Vietnamese forces that Ho was uniting and marshaling against the Japanese and later became known as the People's Army of Vietnam. Patti worked closely with Ho and indeed commented on his early drafts of a Vietnamese constitution.

In my opinion the Vietnam War was a great waste. There was no need for it to happen in the first place. At all. None whatsoever. During all the years of the Vietnam War no one ever approached me to find out what had happened in 1945 or in '44. In all the years that I spent in The Pentagon, Department of State in the White House, never was I approached by anyone in authority. However, I did prepare a large number, and I mean about, oh, well over fifteen position papers on our position in Vietnam. But I never knew what happened to them. Those things just disappeared, they just went down the dry well.

— From an interview with Archimedes Patti in 1981

Patti stated that when he arrived in Kunming in March 1945, the French colonials were either unwilling or unable to assist him in establishing an American intelligence network in Indochina and so he turned to "the only source [available]," the Viet Minh.

Patti was introduced to Ho Chi Minh by Colonel Austin Glass, the OSS expert in Indochina. Patti met Ho Chi Minh on the Indochinese-Chinese border in late April 1945. Ho agreed to provide intelligence to the allies if he could have "a line of communication with the allies."

Patti later helped to co-ordinate some small attacks against the Japanese Imperial Army by using a small group of operatives known as the OSS Deer Team under the command of Major Allison K. Thomas, who worked directly with Ho Chi Minh in August 1945.

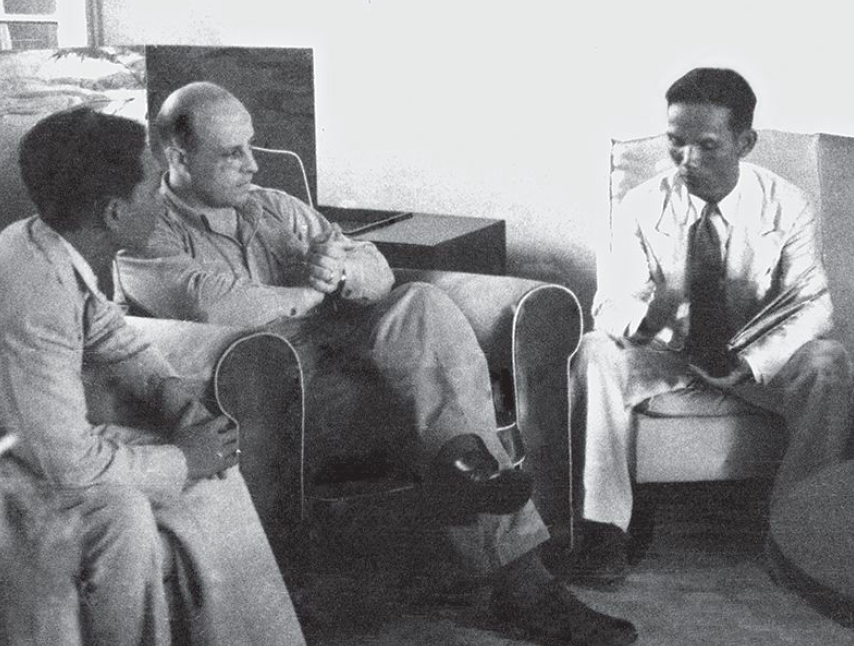
OSS Maj. Archimedes Patti conferred with Võ Nguyên Giáp, 1945 Aug.

Patti arrived in Hanoi on a mercy mission with an OSS agent, Carleton B. Swift, (Note: "Carleton Swift, a CIA employee, replaced Archimedes Patti as head of the O.S.S mission in Hanoi." In the interview, "Swift recounts why he got involved with Indochina and his experiences after he took the mission over from Patti. Swift recalls his impressions of Ho Chi Minh describing him as a slight man and Swift admits to not understand how Ho Chi Minh gained so much power. Swift discusses the way the Americans dealt with the North Vietnamese and the friendships that developed.") and a French government official, Jean Sainteny. His primary mission was to assist in the repatriation of allied prisoners-of-war, as the US government feared reprisals against them by the Japanese after the Atomic bombings of Hiroshima and Nagasaki. His secondary mission was to gather intelligence.

Patti met with Ho Chi Minh on August 26, 1945, over lunch at his residence in Hanoi. Several days later, Ho read a draft of the Vietnamese Declaration of independence to him. Patti offered some corrections to the wording of the opening sentence, which Ho quoted from the United States Declaration of Independence. (Note: See the detailed analysis of the US Declaration of Independence (DoI) and the Vietnam DoI in Notes of Vietnam History.) Ho also quoted the 1791 Declaration of the French Revolution and the motto "liberty, equality, and fraternity." which "first appeared during the French Revolution."

Archimedes Patti Operational Priority communication, sent on September 2, 1945

On September 2, Ho declared independence, and some hours later, Patti had dinner with him. According to historian Pierre Asselin, these references were a strategic move to win Allied support, but behind this façade, Ho Chi Minh had no genuine intention of seeking an alliance with the United States and instead sought an alliance with the Soviet Union, thereby outsmarting Patti.

In the fall of 1945, French colonial forces had returned to Indochina on US-manned Liberty ships. Patti left Hanoi in late September 1945 after French allegations that the Americans had been fomenting a revolution.

== Later life and death ==
Patti retired from the military in 1957. For 13 years, he was a crisis management specialist in the Office of Emergency Planning in Washington, DC.

In 1981, Patti stated that Julia Child, who had worked at the OSS in 1945, had allegedly submitted his position papers on Vietnam to appropriate authorities, but the way in which he had found them upon his retirement was exactly as she had sent them, and they had never been opened or read:

The question rises from time to time as to whether or not the same situation doesn't apply to Iran, to Afghanistan, to El Salvador, to any other trouble spot in the world. That perhaps there are people who may know the causes that actually led to what followed and have never been approached or asked to give at least, if not their views, at least to give what facts they have. That is a question.

In retirement, he wrote several articles and completed his book on Vietnam. In 1980, he finally published his book Why Vietnam? Prelude to America's Albatross, which described his OSS-assigned activities with Ho Chi Minh, the nationalist and communist Viet Minh leader in 1946. His book grew out of his much shorter 1946 memoir, which was completed in the 1950s but had an injunction put by the Department of the Army to prevent its publication because of the anticommunist fervor of the McCarthy era and out of concern for perceived adverse criticism of US foreign policy by military members. (Note: Patti wrote in his book: "Our nation was embroiled in the era of McCarthyism. Sensitive to adverse criticism of American foreign policy by members of the military establishment, the Department of the Army decreed that any public disclosure of information or opinion by me on the question of American involvement in Viet Nam would be regarded with official displeasure and I would be subject to disciplinary action. Under protest I acceded to the Department's injunction.")

He died on April 23, 1998, at the age of 84, and is buried at Arlington National Cemetery.

== Publications ==
- Patti, Archimedes (1980). Why Viet Nam? Prelude to America's Albatross. Berkeley: University of California Press. ISBN 978-0520047839..

== See also ==
- First Indochina War
- Vietnam during World War II
