= Vietnam: The Origins of Revolution =

1966 book by John T. McAlster, Jr.

- Author: John T. McAlister, Jr.
- Language: English
- Genre: Non-fiction
- Publication date: 1966

Vietnam: The Origins of Revolution is a 1966 book by John T. McAlister, Jr. It argues for an original theory on political revolution in Vietnam,

The book, a revised version of the author's doctoral dissertation, chronicles the history of Vietnam from the nascent French colonization in 1885 to the August Revolution in 1945. These events serve as background to the revolution. The author's thesis is that the political events in the middle of the 20th century in Vietnam were not limited to an anti-colonial revolt, but constituted a pervasive political revolution.

== Introduction and conclusion ==
The theory on revolution that McAlister draws from the events in Vietnam is initially foreshadowed in the introduction to the book, and elaborated upon in the conclusion. It is here that the author fully elucidates his theory on revolution and supports it by drawing on the events that were chronicled in the earlier text of the book. Here McAlister cogently argues that modernization of the revolutionary class, enmity towards the so-called oppressive force that surpasses reactionary sentiment, and the capability and determination of the revolutionary leaders are essential factors in order for a revolution to occur.

== Sources ==
The primary sources the author uses to support much of the book were from the archives of the French Army in the First Indochina War. These documents were largely summaries of French intelligence on the Viet Minh during the French occupation. The author, in pursuit of an unbiased account, incorporates sources that were published by Hanoi in order to balance the French sources. At the time of the writing of the book in 1966, McAlister was aware that many sources that could be used in his research were still classified, and he articulated the possibility that relevant information would be contained in the then classified documents.

== Outline ==
The author sets up his thesis by first differentiating between events that are merely revolts and those that are revolutions. A revolt is characterized as a revolution when it is accompanied by significant structural political changes. McAlister makes it a point to clarify his definition of revolution, and does not limit it to a specific event and title, but argues that large scale changes over time are also revolutions. In this way, McAlister's characterization of revolution in Vietnam is more akin to the Industrial Revolution than to other political revolutions such as the Russian Revolution of 1917.

In scope and depth, the events in Vietnam contrasted sharply with a simple revolt against foreign occupiers. The dichotomization of Vietnamese population between the rural peasantry and the urban elites, the horizontal bisection of the country for non-geographical reasons, and expansion of the revolutionary party's antipathy into other areas outside the French occupation are events in Vietnam in the 20th century that McAlister uses to support his thesis.

=== Explaining revolution ===
Aside from characterizing the events in Vietnam as a revolution, McAlister also supports his thesis by arguing why Vietnam underwent a revolution. He does this by drawing a connection between modernity and revolution. In the conclusion of the book he provides evidence that a necessary prerequisite for a large scale revolution is modernization of the revolutionary class. This is supported by other revolutions, for example, those that occurred in Germany and Russia in the 20th century. The group that ultimately became the revolutionary class in Vietnam was the modernized middle class. These were people who were educated and modernized by French institutions, who were expected to serve in the higher level French colonial institutions; thus they felt entitled to an entry into politics, but the French denied them that perceived right. The author concludes that the revolution in Vietnam occurred because the modernized and educated middle class were denied entry into a political realm to which they felt they were entitled.

McAlister argues that the revolutionaries in Vietnam made closing the gap between the educated urbanites with the rural peasantry their central objective. The population of Vietnam was fragmented by geography, class, and culture. The mountain ranges and slim dimensions of Vietnam increased the tendency of the population to be isolated from each other. The population was further split into groups of those who tenaciously adhered to their Confucian values and those who admired the possession of wealth ushered in by the French. To bridge this gap, the Vietnamese revolutionaries used political ideology as a catalyst for solidarity and motivation.

Although communism was the dominant political ideology associated with Vietnam during the 20th century, Vietnamese nationalism played an important role in the incipient revolutionary movement. This was due to pragmatic reasons rather than to an ideological conviction. Because Vietnam was culturally and politically fragmented, no single interest could unite a substantial amount of the population. The only way to unite the country and foment solidarity among a heterogeneous population was through emphasizing their common bond, which was their self-identification as a citizen of Vietnam. In Vietnam nationalism was synthesized with communism, which was the popular ideology of the educated, modernized, and disenfranchised middle class.
