= Carleton B. Swift Jr. =

Carleton Byron Swift Jr. was a U.S. Navy seaman, Office of Strategic Services (OSS) officer, and CIA officer between 1941 and 1974. Swift played a subordinate role to Archimedes Patti as part of the OSS team that met with Ho Chi Minh in September 1945.

== Early life ==
Swift was born on 4 July 1919 in Portland, Oregon, and studied engineering at Harvard University, graduating in 1941. He was the son of Carleton Byron Swift and his wife, Lila Leonard. His father was a member of the Swift meat-packing family.

== Career ==
=== World War II ===
After serving time in the Navy, he joined the OSS and was sent to China where he was based in Kunming and monitored Japanese shipping. He was later assigned to monitor the situation in what would become North Vietnam and after the Atomic bombings of Hiroshima and Nagasaki he traveled with Archimedes Patti and Jean Sainteny to Hanoi. His and Patti's mission was to assist in the repatriation of allied prisoners of war which the U.S. government was concerned the Japanese might hurt following the Atomic bombings of Hiroshima and Nagasaki and secondly to gather intelligence.

During their time in Hanoi the OSS officers and their team met with Ho Chi Minh and although Swift did not speak French as Patti did he also met with Ho Chi Minh on at least one occasion. Swift denied that the U.S. could have been significant in creating the Viet Minh because the OSS had never had more than three 12-14 man commando teams operating in Indochina.

Swift and Patti both left Hanoi at the end of September, 1945 after the French alleged that the Americans had been fomenting a revolution there.

=== Work at the CIA ===
Swift served with the CIA in Seoul, Baghdad, Tokyo, London and The Hague before retiring in 1974.

== Family ==
Swift was married and divorced three times and had six children.

== Death ==
Swift died on January 24, 2012, at his home in Washington.

== See also ==
- Vietnam during World War II
- Decolonisation of Asia
- Imperialism in Asia
- Vietnam War
