= National Liberation Committee of Vietnam =

National Liberation Committee
- Provisional government cabinet of North Vietnam

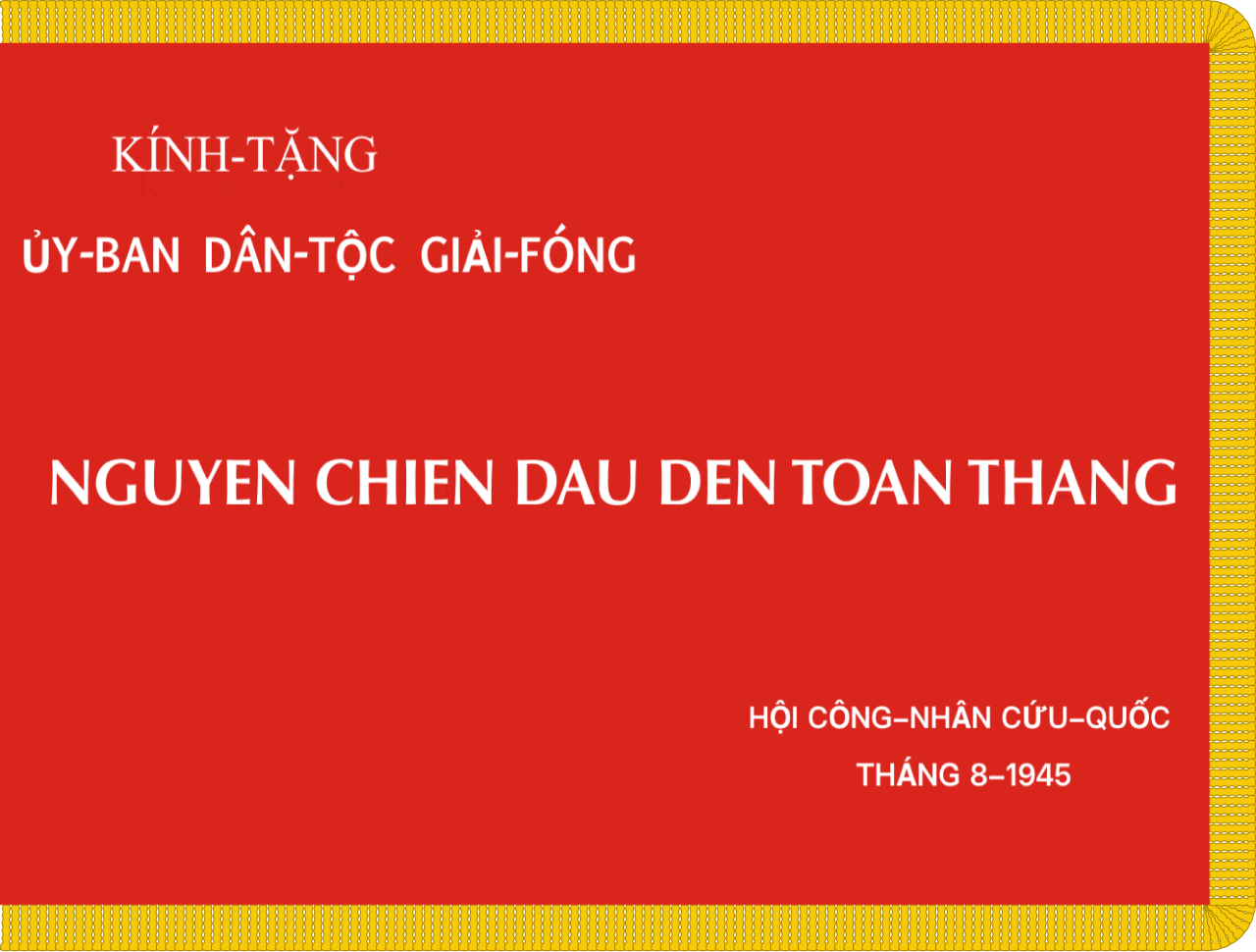
- Award flag of National Liberation Committee
- Date formed: August 16, 1945
- Date dissolved: August 25, 1945

People and organisations
- Head of State: Ho Chi Minh
- General Secretary of ICP: Trường Chinh
- Chairman: Ho Chi Minh
- Deputy Chairman: Trần Huy Liệu
- Member party: Indochinese Communist Party
- Status in legislature: coalition cabinet

History
- Election: Tân Trào National Congress
- Predecessor: Government of Trần Trọng Kim
- Successor: Provisional Revolutionary Government of Democratic Republic of Vietnam

The National Liberation Committee of Vietnam (Vietnamese: Ủy-ban Dân-tộc Giải-phóng Việt-Nam) was the provisional government of the Viet Minh, inaugurated following its approval by the Tân Trào National Congress following the surrender of Japan.

== History ==
After the surrender of Japan on August 15, 1945, Ho Chi Minh and the Viet Minh General Department decided to organize the National Congress on the afternoon of August 16, 1945 and proceed very quickly so that the existing delegates could bring the uprising orders to their localities.

The Congress decided to establish the National Liberation Committee of Vietnam, Ho Chi Minh elected as Chairman, Trần Huy Liệu as Deputy Chairman and members as Nguyễn Lương Bằng, Trường Chinh, Võ Nguyên Giáp, Phạm Văn Đồng, Dương Đức Hiền, Chu Văn Tấn, Nguyễn Chí Thanh, Phạm Ngọc Thạch; Standing members of the Committee are Ho Chi Minh, Tran Huy Lieu, Pham Van Dong, Nguyen Luong Bang, and Duong Duc Hien. The National Congress closed on August 17, 1945.

== Members ==
List of members of the National Liberation Committee of Vietnam:

Name	Office
Hồ Chí Minh	Chairman
Trần Huy Liệu	Deputy Chairman
Nguyễn Lương Bằng	Director of Viet Minh, member
Trường Chinh	General Secretary of ICP, member
Võ Nguyên Giáp	member
Phạm Văn Đồng	member
Dương Đức Hiền	member
Chu Văn Tấn	member
Nguyễn Văn Xuân	member
Cù Huy Cận	member
Nguyễn Đình Thi	member
Lê Văn Hiến	member
Nguyễn Chí Thanh	member
Phạm Ngọc Thạch	member
Nguyễn Hữu Đang	member

== Dissolution ==
On August 25, 1945, Chairman of the National Liberation Committee Ho Chi Minh came to Hanoi. The National Liberation Committee, establish by the National Congress in Tan Trao, was reformed into the Provisional Government of the Democratic Republic of Vietnam. Viet Minh members in the Government voluntarily withdrew from the Government to invite more non-communist politicians to join the Viet Minh.

== See also ==
- August Revolution
- Lê Đức Thọ
- Bình Xuyên
- Viet Cong
