= William J. Duiker =

American historian

William J. Duiker is a former United States Foreign Service officer and is currently Liberal Arts Professor Emeritus of East Asian Studies at Penn State University. His area of expertise is East Asia; while in the Foreign Service, he was stationed in Taiwan (the Republic of China), the Republic of (South) Vietnam, and Washington, D.C.. After leaving the State Department in 1965, he received his PhD degree in East Asian studies at Georgetown University.

While at Penn State, Duiker served for ten years as Director of International Programs and as Chairman of the East Asian Studies Committee. He is the author of several books, including The Rise of Nationalism in Vietnam, Cultures in Collision: The Boxer Rebellion, Sacred War: Nationalism and Revolution in a Divided Vietnam, The Communist Road to Power in Vietnam, U.S. Containment Policy and the Conflict in Indochina, China and Vietnam: the Roots of Conflict, and Ho Chi Minh: A Life. The last, published in 2000, was the first comprehensive biography of Ho Chi Minh using sources from Vietnam. He also collaborates with his colleague Jackson J. Spielvogel in authoring the textbook World History, which is now in its ninth edition with Cengage Press. He is also the sole author of Contemporary World History (Cengage Press), which is now in its seventh edition. Duiker retired from teaching in 1997 and currently lives in Southern Shores, N.C., with his wife Yvonne. He has two children: Laura Duiker Garlitos and Claire Louise Duiker.

== Bibliography ==
- The Communist road to power in Vietnam. Boulder, Colo.: Westview Press. 1981. ISBN 0891587942. OCLC 06735545.
- Ho Chi Minh : a life. New York: Hyperion. 2001. ISBN 0786863870. OCLC 45829411.
