= Jean Sainteny =

20th-century French politician and diplomat

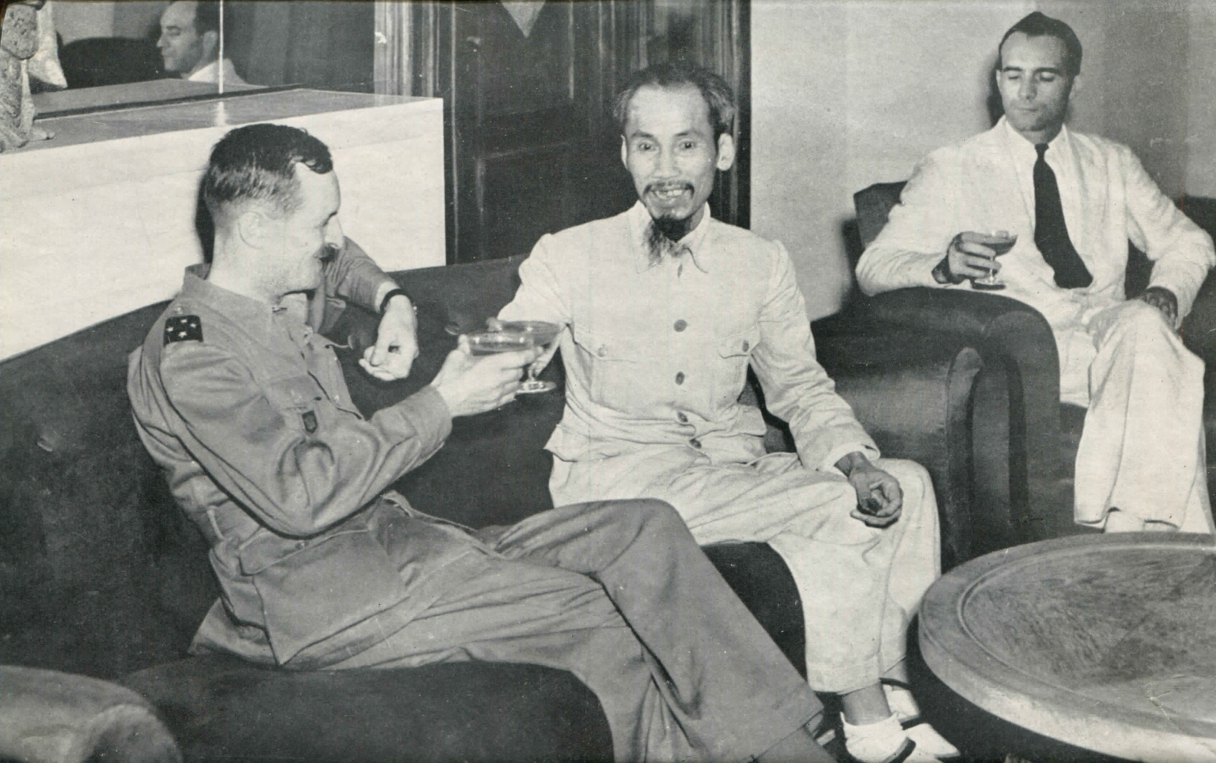
President Ho Chi Minh received at the residence of the French Governor, General Leclerc, left, in the presence of the Commissioner of the Republic of Tonkin, Jean Sainteny, far right, March 18, 1946.

Jean Sainteny or Jean Roger (29 May 1907, in Vésinet – 25 February 1978) was a French politician who was sent to Vietnam after the end of the Second World War in order to accept the surrender of the Japanese forces and to attempt to re-annex Vietnam into French Indochina.

== Biography ==
The son-in-law of the prime minister Albert Sarraut, he was an insurance broker (assureur-conseils). He was in charge of the Normandy sector for the French resistance under the pseudonym "Dragon". He was captured by the Gestapo but succeeded in escaping and took part in organising the Normandy landings, passing to George Patton the information that allowed the Allies to reach Paris.

He traveled to Hanoi on 22 August 1945 with American OSS officers, Archimedes Patti and Carleton B. Swift Jr. before being put under house arrest by the Japanese.

In 1946, he was sent by the French government to Vietnam to negotiate with Ho Chi Minh. In March 1946 he reached the Ho-Sainteny agreement with Ho, recognizing the Vietnamese government as a “free state” (état libre) in the French Union. The agreement became ineffective after the bombing of Haiphong ordered by the High Commissioner Thierry d'Argenlieu, and from then on Sainteny played only a minor role in French-Vietnamese relations. He was wounded in an ambush and after the Geneva Accords, he returned to Hanoi as a French envoy.
