= OSS Deer Team =

United States intelligence agency

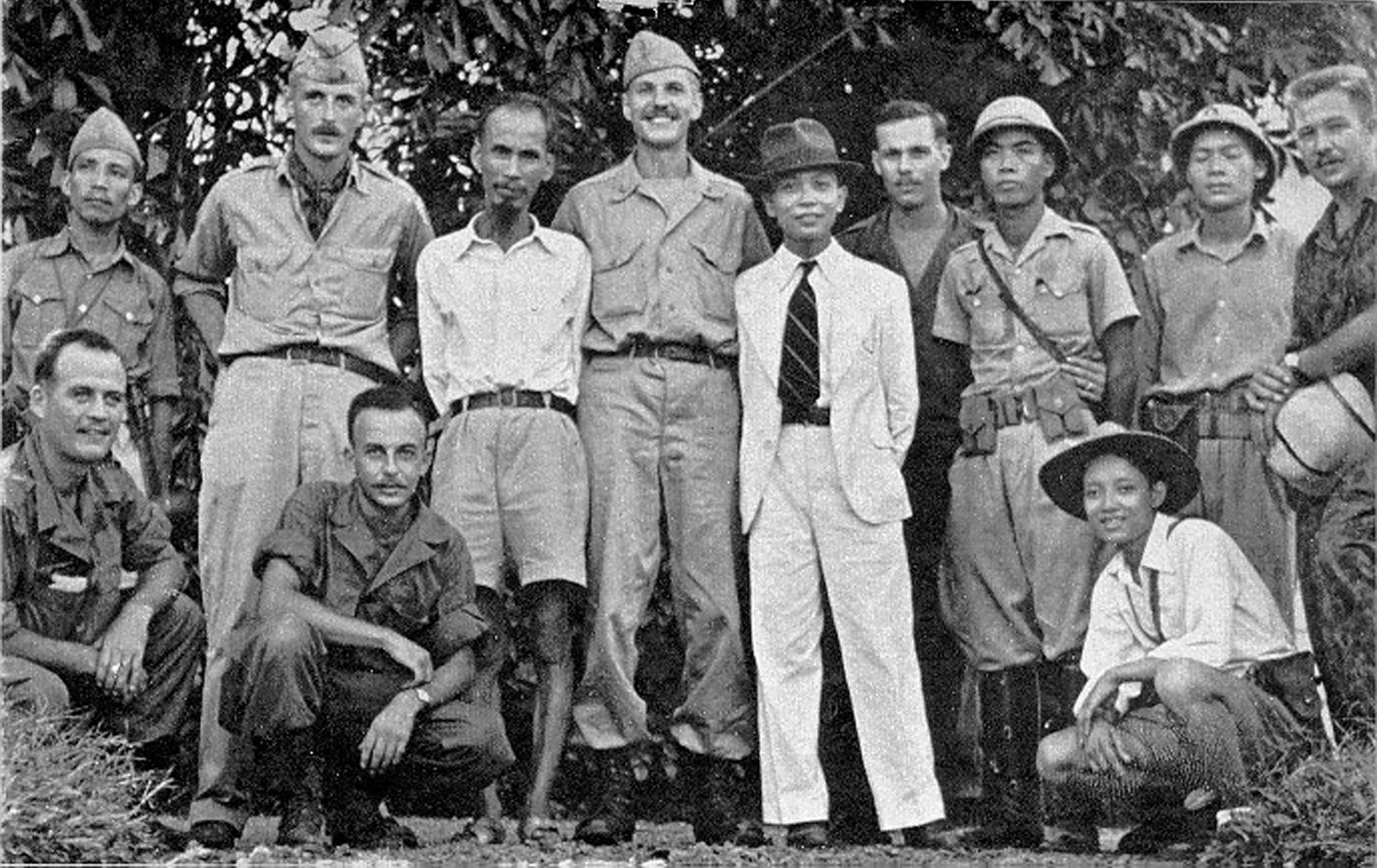
Left to right (standing): Đinh Huy Phan (Hùng Việt), René Defourneaux, Hồ Chí Minh, Allison K. Thomas, Võ Nguyên Giáp, Henry Prunier, Đàm Quang Trung, Nguyễn Quý, and Paul Hoagland. Front row (kneeling): Lawrence Vogt, Aaron Squires, Thái Bạch (Thái Bá Chi) .

The OSS Deer Team was established by the United States Office of Strategic Services on May 16, 1945 to attack and intercept materials on the railroad from Hanoi in central Vietnam to Lạng Sơn in northeast Vietnam with the hope of keeping Japanese military units from entering China. They sent intelligence reports to OSS agents stationed in China. The team provided training, medical and logistical assistance to Hồ Chí Minh and the Việt Minh in 1945.

The first mission of OSS Deer Team was to help train 50 to 100 Việt Minh guerrillas to help drive Japanese soldiers out of French Indochina. Deer Team worked closely with Hồ Chí Minh and Võ Nguyên Giáp, whom they knew only as "Mr. Hoo" and "Mr. Van".

The two groups were friendly and fought as comrades-in-arms to capture the Japanese garrison at Tân Trào, and celebrated that victory by getting drunk together.

The Americans left camp on August 16, not long after hearing the news of Japanese surrender. They traveled on foot with Võ Nguyên Giáp and his troops to Thái Nguyên, the French provincial capital. When guerrilla combatants debuted against French and Japanese troops until the French governor capitulated on August 25, Võ Nguyên Giáp had arranged for the Deer Team to stay hidden away in a safe house on the outskirts of town..

Following the Việt Minh victory, Deer Team stayed for a few days "getting fat, getting a sun-tan, visiting the city and waiting for permission to go to Hanoi. [...] The Việt Minh did everything to make our stay as pleasant as possible for us," said Defourneaux.

Finally, the Americans arrived in Hanoi and returned to the United States. The night before leaving, Major Thomas had a private dinner with Hồ Chí Minh and Võ Nguyên Giáp. Hồ Chí Minh said to Thomas and his men: "I want to thank each of you for what you have done for us. We are truly grateful. You are welcome to come back at any time."

Medic Paul Hoagland is reputed to have saved the life of Hồ Chí Minh with quinine and sulfa drugs. Lieutenant Defourneaux explained:

"Hồ was so ill he could not move from the corner of a smoky hut. [...] Our medic thought it might have been dysentery, dengue fever, hepatitis. [...] While being treated by Pfc Hoagland, Hồ directed his people into the jungle to search for herbs. Hồ shortly recovered, attributing it to his knowledge of the jungle."

When Hồ Chí Minh discovered a French agent sent with the Deer Team who was apparently part of it: "This man is not an American. Look, who are you guys trying to kid? This man is not part of the deal." Lieutenant Montfort was arrested and deported to China. Two other undercover French–Vietnamese agents suffered the same treatment. The OSS was dissolved on 9 September 1945.

== See also ==
- OSS Detachment 101
