= Nguyễn Thái Học =

Vietnamese revolutionary (1902–1930)

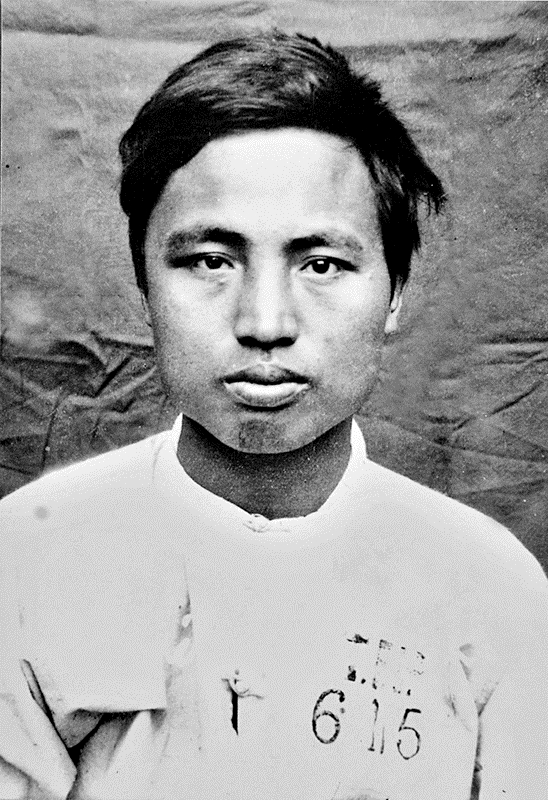
Nguyễn Thái Học, founder and leader of the VNQDD, 1930.

Nguyễn Thái Học (Vietnamese pronunciation: [ŋwiən˦ˀ˥ tʰaːj˧˦ hawk͡p̚˧˨ʔ]; chữ Hán: 阮太學; 1 December 1902 – 17 June 1930) was a Vietnamese revolutionary and independent activist who was the founding leader of the Việt Nam Quốc Dân Đảng, namely the Vietnamese Nationalist Party. He was captured and executed by the French colonial authorities after the failure of the Yên Bái mutiny.

Many cities in Vietnam have named major streets after him. This was the case in both North and South even when the country was divided before the fall of Saigon in April 1975. One of the most notable is Nguyễn Thái Học Street, Hanoi.

== Early activism ==
Học was an alumnus of Hanoi's Commercial School, and had been stripped of a scholarship because of his mediocre academic performance. Hoc had previously tried to initiate peaceful reforms to French colonial rule by making written submissions to authorities, but these were ignored, and his attempt to foster policy change through the publication of a magazine never materialized due to the refusal of a license. In 1925-26, a small group of young Hanoi-based intellectuals, started the Nam Đông thư xã (Southeast Publishing House). They aimed to promote violent revolution as a means of gaining independence and published material about the 1911 Revolution. Học and a few other students and teachers led by Nguyễn Thái Học.

== VNQDD formation ==
The Việt Nam Quốc dân Đảng (VNQDD) was formed at a meeting in Hanoi on December 25, 1927, with Học as the party's first leader. It was Vietnam's first home-grown revolutionary party, established three years before the Indochinese Communist Party. In December 1928, Nguyen Khac Nhu replaced Hoc as chairman. VNQDD membership grew quickly, until a French crackdown in response to the assassination of Alfred Bazin, director of the 'Office général de la main-d’œuvre indochinoise (OGMOI)', a colonial agency for the recruitment of local Coolies. Hoc felt that assassinations were pointless because they would only prompt a crackdown by the French Sûreté, thereby weakening the party. He felt that it was better to strengthen the party until the time was ripe to overthrow the French, viewing Bazin as a 'mere twig on the tree of the colonial apparatus', while other VNQDD leaders felt that killing Bazin was necessary so that the party would appear to be relevant to workers, given that the communists had begun to target this demographic for their recruitment drives. The French reacted by apprehending as many party members as possible; Học and Nhu were among the few senior leaders who escaped from a raid on their hideout at the Vietnam Hotel.

After the crackdowns, Học argued for a change in strategy in favour of a general uprising, citing rising discontent among Vietnamese soldiers in the colonial army. While more moderate party leaders believed this move to be premature, but Học's stature meant he prevailed in shifting the party's orientation towards violent struggle. One of the arguments presented for large-scale violence was that the French response to the Bazin assassination meant that the party's strength could decline in the long term. The plan was to provoke a series of uprisings at military posts around the Red River Delta in early 1930, where VNQDD forces would join Vietnamese soldiers in an attack on the two major northern cities of Hanoi and Haiphong.

== Yen Bai mutiny ==
On November 24, 1929, in preparation for the attack, the VNQDD formed a provisional government in anticipation of ending French rule. Hoc was elected president. On December 25, 1929, the French authorities attempted to arrest the whole VNQDD leadership in a raid on a planning meeting at Vong La, having been tipped off by Military Affairs Minister Pham Thanh Duong. The VNQDD leaders narrowly escaped, learning of Duong's role in the process, before assembling in the village in Son Duong to continue preparations.

As the French knew an uprising was imminent, they began disrupting preparations, while the VNQDD tried to move as quickly as possible. On January 28, 1930, a final planning meeting was held in the village of Vong La in Phú Thọ Province. Học declared that the situation was reaching desperation, and asserted that if the party did not act soon, they would be smashed by French police. Học built up enthusiasm for the revolt, and those who were reluctant to carry through were coerced into complying. The uprising was set for the night of February 9 and the small hours of the following day. Hoc was to command forces in the lower Red River Delta near the city of Haiphong.

The uprisings were supposed to be simultaneous, but Học sent a last-minute order to Nhu to postpone action until February 15. The messenger was arrested by the French and Nhu was unaware of the change in schedule, so the attacks started on the original day, while Học waited until February 15, by which time most of the attacks had already been suppressed. On the night of February 15–16, the nearby villages of Phu Duc in Thái Bình Province and Vĩnh Bảo in Hải Dương Province were seized for a few hours by Học and his remaining forces. In the first case, the VNQDD fighters disguised themselves as colonial troops and managed to trick their opponents, before seizing the military post in the town. In the process, they wounded three guards and disarmed the post. In the second village, the local mandarin representing the French colonial government was murdered. After being driven out, the VNQDĐ fled to the village of Co Am. On February 16, French warplanes responded by bombarding the settlement. Five wooden Potez 35 biplanes dropped 60 10 kg bombs on the village and raked machine-gun fire indiscriminately, killing 200, mostly civilians. The insurrection was officially declared over on February 22, after Hoc and his lieutenants, Pho Duc Chinh and Nguyen Thanh Loi, were apprehended while trying to flee into China.

At his trial, Hoc described himself as a professional revolutionary and took responsibility for the entire campaign. He identified himself as the VNQDD leader and then gave a political speech about the VNQDD's objectives and why non-violent lobbying was ineffective, before being cut off by the presiding judge. Hoc mixed anti-colonial rhetoric based on anecdotes of prior anti-Chinese and anti-French warriors, with French history and political thought regarding civil rights, which according to Luong, showed the influence of French education on the political base of the VNQDD. Luong cited Hoc's use of terms such as equality and liberty repeatedly. Hoc was among 39 sentenced to death, and tried to appeal his death sentence to the Council of the Protectorate, and after this failed, sought clemency. Presidential pardons were granted to most of those condemned to death, but not those who had killed a French officer, warrant officer, or a native soldier. Hoc was denied clemency and was among the 13 who were guillotined on June 17, 1930. The condemned men cried "Viet Nam!" as they were to be executed. Hoc's fiancée committed suicide later on the same day. Hoc made a last plea to the French in the form of a letter. In it, he claimed that he had always wanted to cooperate with the authorities, but that French intransigence had forced him to revolt. He contended that if France wanted to stay in Indochina, then it would have to drop policies that he termed as brutal, and become more amiable towards Vietnamese people. He called for the introduction of universal education, training in commerce and industry and an end to the corruption of the French-installed mandarins.

== Gallery ==
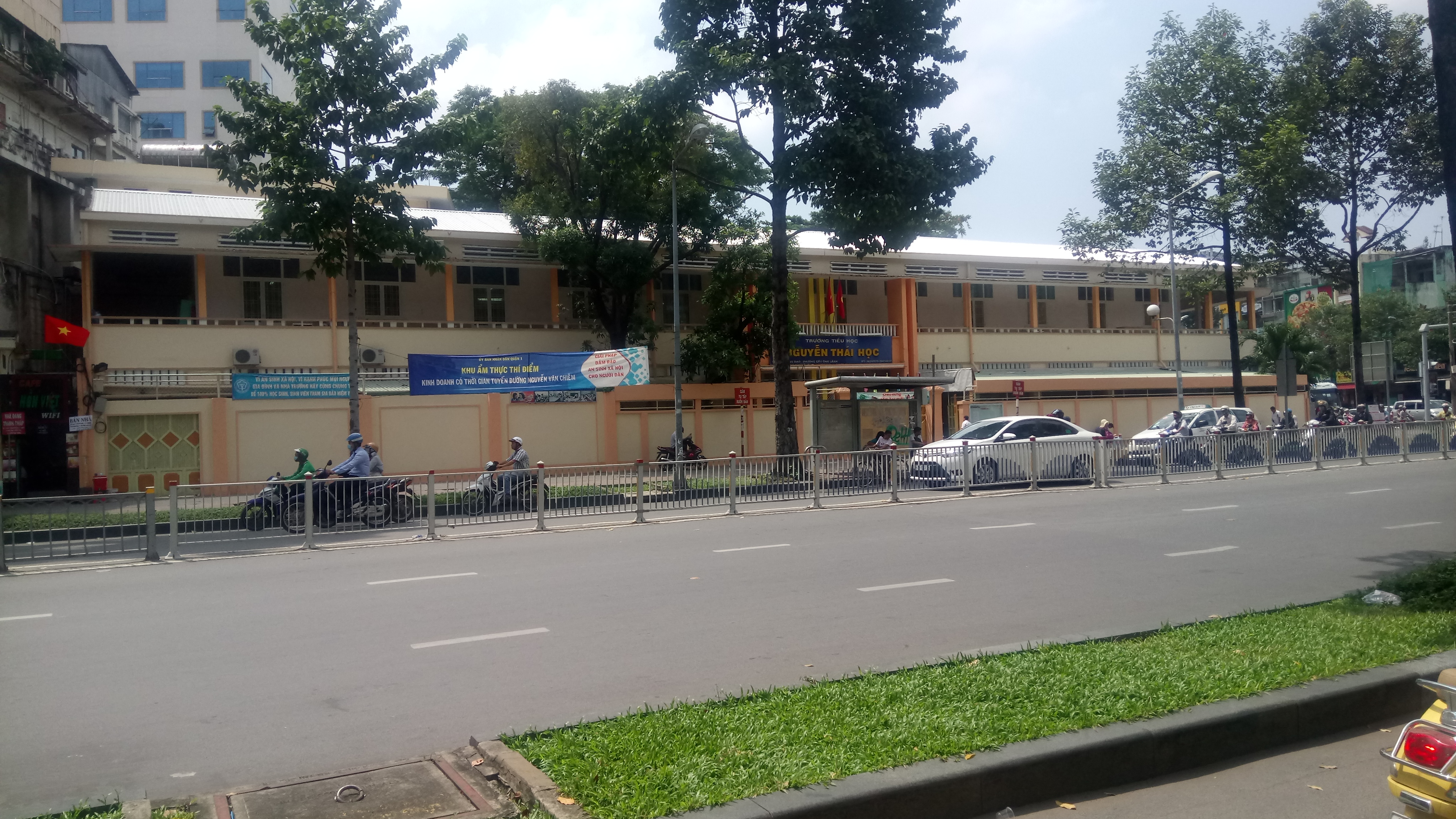
Trường Tiểu học Nguyễn Thái Học (Nguyễn Thái Học Elementary School), District 1, Ho Chi Minh City
