= Yên Bái mutiny =

Failed 1930 uprising in colonial Vietnam against French rule

Yên Báy general uprising
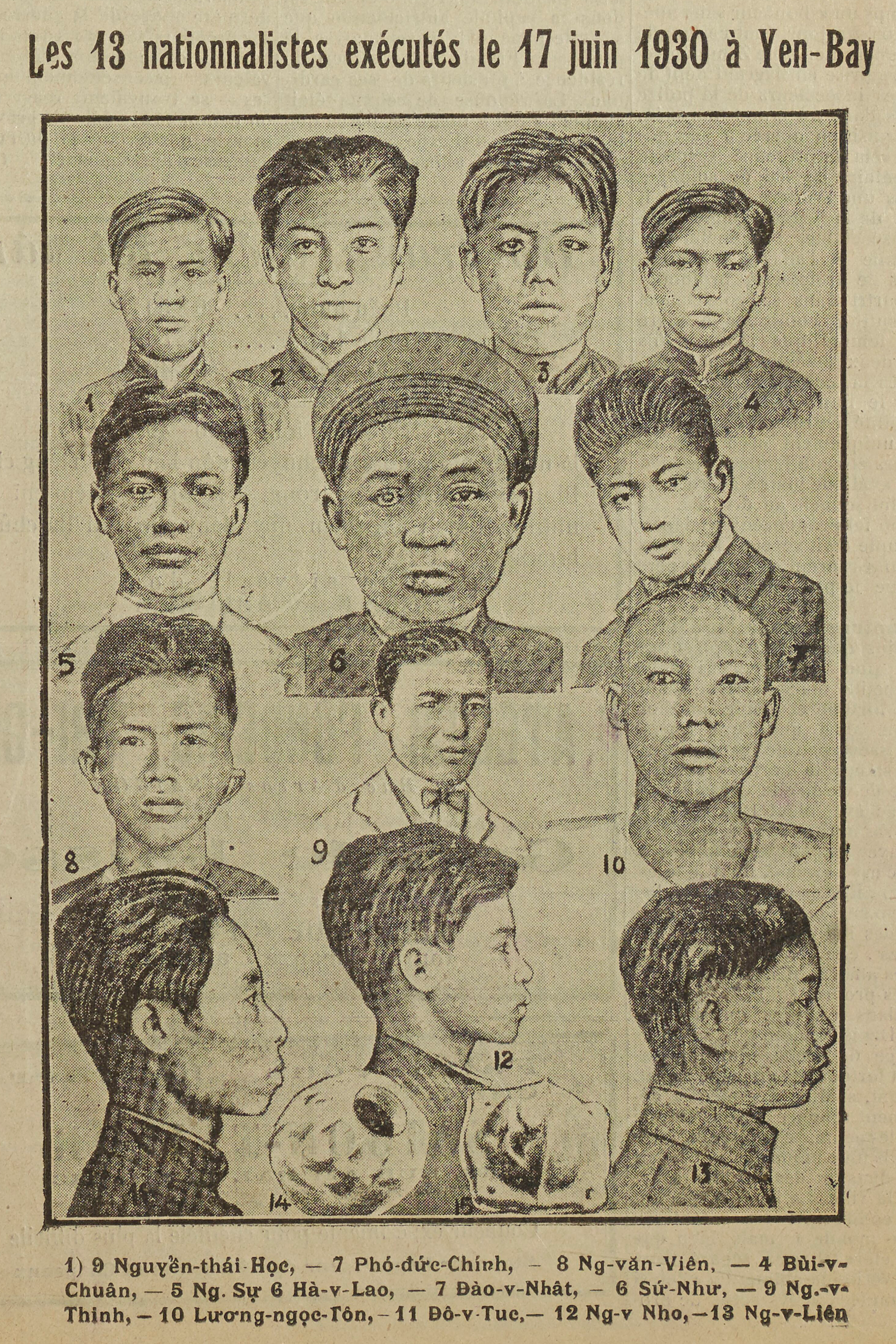
- Portraits of 13 Yên Bái martyrs in 17 June 1930.
Date	10 February 1930
Location	Yên Bái with 7 other provinces and 4 municipalities of French Tonkin.
Result	French victory: Uprising crushed.; Some villages were massacred by French soldiers.; Division of the Nationalist Party.: Rebels severely damaged by arrests and executions by French authorities.; Many leaders had to escape to China.

Belligerents
Vietnam Nationalist Party; Vietnam Revolutionary Force	(France) Government of French Indochina; Tonkin Infantry Regiment; East French Air Force

Commanders and leaders
Nguyễn Thái Học (executed); Phó Đức Chính (executed); Đoàn Trần Nghiệp (executed); Nguyễn Khắc Nhu †; Nguyễn Thị Bắc (POW); Nguyễn Thị Giang †; Vũ Hồng Khanh; Nhượng Tống	Resident Massimi; Commandant Le Tacon; Chief Louis Marty; Governor Vi Văn Định

Strength
~100	~600

Casualties and losses
Unknown number of casualties 13 were later executed	2 French officers and 3 French NCOs dead 3 French NCOs wounded Unknown number of casualties among Vietnamese soldiers in the French army

The Yên Bái mutiny (Vietnamese: Bạo-động Yên-bái) or officially Yên Báy general uprising (Tổng khởi-nghĩa Yên-báy) was an uprising of Vietnamese soldiers in the French colonial army on 10 February 1930. This took place in collaboration with civilian supporters who were members of the Vietnam Nationalist Party.

== Background ==
The aim of the Yên Bái revolt was to inspire a wider uprising among the general populace in an attempt to overthrow the colonial regime and establish independence. The VNQDĐ had previously attempted to engage in clandestine activities to undermine French rule, but increasing French scrutiny on their activities led to their leadership group taking the risk of staging a large-scale military attack in the Red River Delta in northern Vietnam.

Shortly after midnight on 10 February, about 50 Vietnamese soldiers (Tirailleurs indochinois) of the 4th Regiment of Tonkinese Rifles within the Yên Bái garrison turned on their French officers, with assistance from about 60 civilian VNQDĐ members who invaded the camp from the outside. The mutiny failed within 24 hours when the majority of the Vietnamese soldiers in the garrison refused to participate and remained loyal to the colonial army. Further sporadic attacks occurred across the Delta region, with little impact. French retribution to the attack was swift and decisive. The main leaders of the VNQDĐ were arrested, tried and put to death, effectively ending the military threat of what was previously the leading Vietnamese nationalist revolutionary organisation.

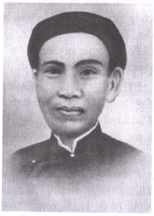
The VNQDĐ provided the first sustained military opposition to French rule since Phan Đình Phùng.

Vietnam had gradually become a French colony between 1859 and 1883. The first phase started in 1859, when French and Spanish forces began an invasion of the Cochinchina, leading to the ceding of three southern provinces to form the colony of Cochinchina under the Treaty of Saigon in 1864. In 1867, the French seized three further provinces and by 1883, the process was complete, when northern and central Vietnam were conquered and made into the French protectorates of Tonkin and Annam and incorporated into French Indochina. Initially, military resistance to French rule came through the Cần Vương movement led by Tôn Thất Thuyết and Phan Đình Phùng, which sought to install the boy Emperor Hàm Nghi at the head of an independent nation. However, with the death of Phùng in 1895, military opposition effectively ended. The only other notable incidents after this came in 1917 with the Thai Nguyen rebellion. The lack of militant activity changed in the late 1920s with the formation of the VNQDĐ, or Vietnamese Nationalist Party. The party began to generate attention among French colonial authorities and was blamed for the assassination of Bazin on 9 February 1929, a French labour recruiter despised among the populace, leading to a heavy French crackdown. The French purges caused considerable detriment to the independence movement in general and the VNQDĐ in particular. Nearly 1000 VNQDĐ members were arrested; the demolition of many of the Party's facilities ensued. The VNQDĐ decided to abandon its clandestine philosophy and engage in open attacks against the French, hoping to foment a general uprising among the people. A minority felt that even though there was a danger that French crackdowns would irreparably weaken the party, they should try and bide their time and go into hiding in the mountainous Hoa Binh Province and focus on writing propaganda books and pamphlets, and take an extended period to prepare a large armed attack. It has also been alleged that Ho Chi Minh had tried to contact the VNQDD leadership to try and advise them to bide their time.

Recruitment campaigns and grassroots activist drives were put in place, even though the VNQDĐ were realistic and understood that their assault was unlikely to succeed. The village elders were used to mobilise neighbours into the political movement. Others travelled to nearby villages and tried to recruit younger members by invoking the success of Japan in militarily defeating Russia in 1905 and Kuomintang in China. The party logic was "Even if victory is not achieved, we will fully mature as human beings with our [heroic] efforts".

Since the VNQDĐ was only strong in the northern areas of Vietnam, the attacks were to be staged in the Red River Delta, and the garrison at Yen Bay was identified as a key point. The French authorities used Vietnamese soldiers and VNQDĐ members were among the garrison at Yen Bay; they engaged in cajoling their colleagues with revolutionary rhetoric. Although armed resistance had died down since World War I, the Red River area of northern Vietnam, which included Yên Bái, had been a disproportionate source of nationalist militancy since the French colonisation.

However, the preparation for the planned uprising was affected by discoveries of arms caches and propaganda material. In part, this was due to a high-ranking informer, Pham Thanh Duong, who was on the VNQDD's Central Committee as the head of military affairs. A high-level planning meeting was held on 1 November 1929, and this was soon reported in full to local colonial officials and military intelligence. At this meeting, the VNQDD leader Nguyễn Thái Học asked for a map of the French military airfield at Bach Mai and assigned Duong the responsibility of recruiting personnel for an attack. Discussions were also held for the finalisation of plans of attack on Nam Dinh, Lang Son, Haiphong, Bac Ninh and Mong Cai, although an intended assault on the capital Hanoi was still not ready. Hoc told Duong that several hundreds of civilians would be found for the airfield attack, and that sufficient food and weaponry was available for participants. Two days later, at another meeting, the leadership discussed the importance of holding the towns to be attacked for several days so that exiled Vietnamese could arrive from China. The VNQDD leadership also discussed the need to try and widen the attacks to areas in central and southern Vietnam, and to recruit Vietnamese soldiers who were members of the colonial army.

On 24 November 1929, in preparation for the attack, the VNQDD formed a provisional government in anticipation of ending French rule. This occurred in the presence of 13 provincial VNQDD leaders. Hoc was elected president, Nhu vice president, Chinh the interior minister, and Duong the military affairs minister. On 25 December 1929, the French authorities made an attempt to arrest the whole VNQDD leadership in a raid on a planning meeting at Vong La, having been tipped off by Duong. The VNQDD leaders narrowly escaped, learning of Duong's role in the process. Duong was later shot in the abdomen by VNQDD members in Hanoi in May 1930, seriously injuring him. Chinh was taken by Nguyen Dac Bang to the latter's village in Son Duong to recover from injuries caused in the raid, and the village turned out to be a focal point for the preparations for the attack, serving as the de facto regional headquarters. Throughout the latter part of 1929, more VNQDD members came to Son Duong to hide and continue preparations.

With the knowledge that an attack was going to take place, and due to prior disturbances, French colonial authorities took measures within the colonial forces to try and dilute the effect of any anticipated mutiny. There had been specific concerns about the fidelity of Vietnamese troops in the garrisons located at Hanoi and Nam Dinh, and plans to transfer some troops to remote areas to lower the level of Vietnamese troops in these areas had been discussed. A number of Vietnamese warrant officers, who had been charged with disciplining their Vietnamese enlisted men, had already been transferred away from larger centres, disrupting VNQDD attempts to foment an insurrection within the colonial military. At a more general level, large-scale arrests in the provinces of Kiên An, Hai Duong, Vinh Yên, Bac Ninh and Bac Giang had also compromised the planned military campaigns in those localities. Despite the fact that Duong's cover had been blown, the French authorities still continued to receive some intelligence indicating that attacks were planned for northern Vietnam during the Lunar New Year period in early February. Military and civilian colonial leaders were placed on alert and efforts were made to clamp down on the propagation of any anti-colonial sentiments among Vietnamese soldiers. Having been warned of an impending attack on the town of Hung Hoa in Phu Tho Province, 50 additional soldiers were brought in on the eve of the attack, something the VNQDD was unaware of.

On 28 January 1930, a final planning meeting was held in the village of Vong La in Phú Thọ Province. The VNQDĐ leader Nguyễn Thái Học declared that the situation was reaching desperation, and asserted that if the party did not act soon, they would be scattered by French police. Học built up enthusiasm for the revolt, and those who were reluctant to carry through were coerced into complying. The uprising was set for the night of 9 February and the small hours of the following day. Hoc was to command forces in the lower Red River Delta near the city of Haiphong, Nguyen Khac Nhu was assigned the upper delta around Yên Bái and Pho Duc Chinh was to lead an attack on the military post at Sơn Tây. Nguyen The Nghiep, who had split with the main body of the VNQDĐ, led a group who was now across the Chinese border in Yunnan province. He said that he had the support of local soldiers at the Lào Cai garrison and would launch attacks on French border posts, so exiled VNQDĐ members could re-enter Vietnam and join the uprising.

The uprisings were supposed to be simultaneous, but Học sent a last-minute order to Nhu to postpone action until 15 February. The messenger was arrested by the French and Nhu was unaware of the change in schedule. Yen Bay was a military post comprising more than 600 troops in four companies of infantry. These were commanded by 20 French officers and non-commissioned officers. VNQDĐ members had been espousing revolutionary sentiment in the area for several months and there was considerable tension in the town leading up to the planned mutiny. The nearby village of Sơn Dương in Phú Thọ was a hotbed of preparations, as many of the bombs and hand grenades used by the VNQDĐ were manufactured there. These were made from cast iron shells or cement opium containers that were then filled with gunpowder. More than 100 bombs by around 20 militants were made at the home of Nguyen Dac Bang, who also organised the drafting and printing of propaganda leaflets—for distribution among soldiers and civilians alike—and led the recruitment of villagers in his area. Over the course of the preparations, the village administrators, who were part of the French regime, joined the movement and did not report the activities to their colonial superiors. It was there that Nhu prepared a command post to coordinate what would be the centrepiece of the attack, the assaults against Yên Bái and Phú Thọ. Bombs and other weapons were also manufactured in Cao Mai and Xuan Lung in the district of Lam Thao.

Some VNQDĐ members, villagers from Sơn Dương and other settlements in Lâm Thao District, both male and female, had begun to arrive in Yen Bay with weapons in their baggage. They travelled to the garrison town by train on the pretence of going on a pilgrimage to a noted temple. They carried bombs, scimitars, and insignia, which they hid under religious material, such as incense and fruit and flowers that were to be offered at the altar. The group split into three and disembarked at three different stations in order to avoid raising the suspicion of the police. They were then led to hideouts by those Vietnamese soldiers in the colonial army who were in league with them. Contemporaneous French military reports and a VNQDD member suggested that there were around 200 people from Phu Tho province, but the final French report estimated 60 participants based on the fluctuation in the number of fourth-class train tickets sold for the relevant rail service.

On 9 February, the evening before the attacks, back in Sơn Dương, a large contingent of rebels made their final preparations before heading into battle. They met at three points; the homes of Bang and the local Confucian scholar, and in the fields. They then joined for a final meeting before Nhu divided the combined forces in two groups. Nhu led one towards a barracks in Hưng Hóa, while the other would attack the town facilities in the district capital of Lâm Thao. Some members of the rebels wore khaki uniforms and they departed for their objective after midnight. Nhu was armed with the pistol, while the others were each given a scimitar and two bombs. The groups traversed rivers on boats and arrived outside their attack points, where they were to synchronised their assaults by sending a light signal.

The local French commander at Yên Bái had been warned of suspicious circumstances, and although he gave them no credence, he did implement minor precautions. At nightfall, the VNQDĐ conspirators in Yên Bái held a final meeting on a nearby hill. They wore red and gold silk headbands. The red stood for revolution and the gold represented the Vietnamese people. They donned red armbands with the words "Vietnam Revolutionary Army". Around forty attended and some wanted to back down, but the remainder threatened to have them shot.

== Military mutiny ==
At around 1:30 a.m. on Monday, 10 February 1930, approximately 50 indigenous soldiers belonging to the Second Battalion of the Fourth Regiment of Tonkinese Rifles (Régiment de Tirailleurs Tonkinois), stationed at Yên Bái and reinforced by around 60 civilian members of the VNQDĐ, attacked their 29 French officers and warrant officers. The plan was for the rebels to split into three groups. One group was to infiltrate the infantry barracks, kill French NCOs in their beds and raise support amongst the Vietnamese troops; a second, which was to include the external VNQDD members, was to fight its way into the post headquarters, while the third group would enter the officers' quarters. The longer-term goal was to capture the barracks, secure the city, set up anti-aircraft guns in the hills and create a strong point around the railway station. They were to dig trenches around it to defend it from incoming colonial forces.

The Frenchmen were caught off guard and five were killed, with three seriously wounded. The mutineers managed to win over a few more tirailleurs from the 5th and 6th companies of the battalion, and raised the flag of the VNQDĐ on top of one of the buildings. They captured the armoury and proclaimed victory. The leaders of the uprising sent a patrol into the centre of the town to exhort the populace to join the insurrection, falsely claiming that they had already eliminated the entire French officer corps.

In part, the authorities in Yên Bai did not anticipate the attack as well as they could have, due to a lack of coordination between military and civilian authorities. The garrison commander saw the base as being outside the realm of civilian administration, and the awkwardness between the military and civilian administrators was accentuated by the fact that the civilian résident had previously been an officer with a lower rank than the garrison commander.

However, about two hours later, it became apparent that the badly coordinated uprising had failed, as the remaining 550 native soldiers refused to participate in the mutiny, instead helping to quell the rebellion. Some went into the town to protect French civilians and office buildings from attack. Three Vietnamese sergeants were subsequently awarded the Médaille militaire for their role in the suppression of the mutiny, while six other tirailleurs received the Croix de Guerre. The attack initially generated confusion among the French administration. It was widely reported by the French media in Vietnam and Europe that the Indochinese Communist Party had organised the uprising, and this was also relayed by local colonial authorities in Vietnam back to the Minister of Colonies, who still maintained his belief that the communists had been responsible three decades after the event.

Due to the failure of their attempt to take control of the barracks, the VNQDĐ leaders did not achieve their goal of seizing the train station. They also failed to cut the telegraph lines, allowing the colonial forces to send a message requesting air support.

One reason given to explain the failure of the bulk of the garrison to support the rebels was that a local VNQDĐ leader inside the garrison, Quang Can, had fallen ill in the lead-up and was sent to a hospital in Hanoi. When he heard of the failed uprising, he committed suicide. In addition, the insurrectionists had failed to liquidate the Garde indigène (native gendarmerie) post of Yen Bay town and were unable to convince the frightened civilian population to join them in a general revolt. At 07:30, a counterattack by tirailleurs of the 8th company of the battalion led by their French commander, backed by a single aircraft, scattered the mutineers; two hours later, order was re-established in Yen Bay.

== VNQDĐ uprising ==
On the same evening, the two VNQDĐ insurrectionary attempts in the Sơn Dương sector also failed. When Nhu saw the light flashing from Lâm Thao, he ordered his men—numbering around 40—to enter Hưng Hóa and head for the barracks, to raid the Garde indigène post. Nhu's men traversed the streets and avoided passing the French administrative offices and arrived at the military complex, shouting at the Vietnamese sentries to open the doors and join the revolt. One of the VNQDĐ militants carried a banner saying "Revolutionary Armed Forces: Every Sacrifice for the Liberation of the Fatherland and the Vietnamese People". They had banked on their countrymen joining them, but instead were met with gunfire. The VNQDĐ responded by throwing bombs over the walls and setting fire to a side door. They then forced their way in and focused their attack on the residence of the commanding officer, but he managed to escape. Three of the men penetrated the officers' compound to mount a search. The colonial forces were stronger and easily repelled the VNQDĐ group, who retreated and headed towards the river. However, their three comrades were in the compound searching for the commanding officer and did not hear the signal to retreat. Nevertheless, they were able to escape after the colonial troops had already dispersed their VNQDĐ colleagues. The French captured three other men and 17 unused bombs.

It appeared that certain of the Vietnamese soldiers and Garde indigène gendarmes comprising the Hưng Hóa garrison had received prior warning of the insurrection. The VNQDĐ members had done propaganda work in trying to cultivate the Hưng Hóa tirailleurs in the past and were confident of being able to sway them. Possibly wary of the loyalty of the locally recruited tirailleurs and gardes, French officials had brought in 50 troops from another area on the eve of the uprising.

Nhu then decided that his men would go to Lâm Thao to reinforce their colleagues. On the way, they stopped at the nearby town of Kinh Khe, where the instructor, Nguyen Quang Kinh, and one of his two wives were slain by VNQDĐ members in an apparent revenge killing. Kinh had previously been affiliated with the VNQDĐ, whose members took him away. His wife had tried to follow him, so the VNQDĐ captured her as well. French intelligence reports speculated that Kinh had been killed because he would not join his former colleagues. Nhu then led his men through Lâm Thao. The plan was that they would help to consolidate the other unit's control on the town until the afternoon. They were hopeful that the attack in Yên Bái would have been successfully completed by then, and that the mutineers and people of Yên Bái would come to Lâm Thao and stage their forces before attacking the barracks at Phu Tho. However, they were not fast enough.

Earlier in the night, the VNQDĐ group at Lâm Thao had managed to destroy the Garde indigène post in Lâm Thao and the VNQDĐ briefly seized control of the district seat. They had disarmed the Vietnamese personnel of the Garde indigène detachment in the town and the district chief fled, so the nationalists were able to burn down his quarters. A young VNQDĐ member had rallied the town's population by propounding the plans of the VNQDĐ, and the population in the surrounding areas responded by entering the town shouting nationalist slogans and offering to either volunteer to join the uprising or donate food supplies. The VNQDĐ flag was raised over the town and a proclamation of victory was read out. At sunrise, a newly arrived Garde indigène unit inflicted heavy losses on the insurgent group, mortally wounding Nhu, one of the main leaders of the VNQDĐ. Nhu attempted to commit suicide, finally succeeding on the third attempt. Many of the rebels were captured and the remainder retreated.

Aware of what had happened in the upper delta region, Chinh abandoned plans for an attack on the Sơn Tây garrison and fled, but he was captured a few days later by French authorities. The French imposed a curfew on Hanoi, the capital of northern Vietnam for 12 days. French troops were sent to Sơn Tây and Phu Tho where attacks by the VNQDD had been planned, and reinforcements were sent to Tuyên Quang, Nam Định and Hải Dương as well. Garrisons that consisted entirely of Vietnamese were reinforced with French soldiers.

A few further violent incidents occurred until 22 February, when Governor-General of French Indochina Pierre Pasquier declared that the insurrection had been defeated. On 10 February, a policeman was injured by a VNQDĐ member at a checkpoint in Hanoi; at night, arts students pelted government buildings with bombs. The buildings were targeted because they symbolised what the students regarded as the colonial state's repressive power. On the night of 15 February and the early morning of 16 February, the nearby villages of Phu Duc in Thái Bình Province and Vĩnh Bảo in Hải Dương Province were seized for a few hours by the leader of the VNQDĐ, Nguyễn Thái Học, and his remaining forces. In the first case, the VNQDD fighters disguised themselves as colonial troops and managed to trick their opponents, before seizing the military post in the town. In the process, they wounded three guards and disarmed the post. In the second village, the local mandarin representing the French colonial government, Tri Huyen, was murdered. After being driven out, the VNQDĐ fled to the village of Co Am. On 16 February, French warplanes responded by bombarding the settlement. It was the first time that air power had been used in Indochina. Five wooden Potez 35 biplanes dropped 60 10 kg bombs on the village and raked machine-gun fire indiscriminately, killing 200, mostly civilians. On the same day, Tonkin's Resident Superior René Robin, ordered a mopping-up operation involving two hundred Gardes indigènes under eight French commanders and two Sûreté inspectors. The insurrection was officially declared over on 22 February, after Hoc and his lieutenants, Pho Duc Chinh and Nguyen Thanh Loi, were apprehended while trying to flee into China. Robin told his officials to publicise the punitive bombing of the village in order to intimidate and dissuade other settlements from supporting the VNQDĐ.

In response to the VNQDD attacks, the French engaged in punitive raids into Sơn Dương, burning down 69 homes, forcing the villages to pay extra taxes and perform corvee labour to rebuild the destroyed French property in Lâm Thao. The villagers were then fined and forced at gunpoint to walk 16 km to Lam Thao from their village to deliver bamboo to the French authorities. In Son Duong and other villages, the large bamboo hedge enclosing the settlements were removed in an attempt to "shame" the populace, who were now "exposed" to the outside world. The troops at Yên Bái initiated a security crackdown by banning local boats from travelling along the Red River and preventing the transport of merchandise by other means, resulting in 10,000 piasters of lost revenue in the space of a month.

The anthropologist and historian Hy V. Luong said that although the failure of the attack was not unexpected given the imbalance in resources, he also noted that the VNQDD support base was overwhelming restricted to the educated urban class rather than the rural masses, and was thus not suited for a protracted guerrilla given that it had not cultivated the population for that purpose.

War flag of the Vietnam Revolutionary Army was erected atop the garrison in Yên Bái.

== French reaction ==
Neither the mutiny nor the popular uprising came entirely as a surprise to the French authorities. The colonial government's first large scale crackdown on the VNQDĐ in 1929 had substantially damaged the party, which had modelled itself on the Chinese Kuomintang of Chiang Kai-shek. The crackdown also had the effect of increasing the violent tendencies within what remained of the VNQDĐ. Its remaining leadership was now willing to intensify preparations for a violent overthrow of colonial rule to create an independent Vietnamese republic. Most of the party's leadership ranks, but not its lower-ranking members and affiliates, seem to have concluded that they were too weak and too closely spied on by the Sûreté to have a meaningful chance of success. At the most optimistic, they could hope to trigger a spontaneous uprising; at the worst, the subsequent French reprisals would transform them into anti-colonial martyrs. Finally, there was disagreement or a communication problem over the timing of the insurrection: after Hoc had ordered the postponement of the mutiny, Nhu still proceeded.

=== Judicial measures ===
One of the first responses taken in the aftermath of Yen Bay mutiny was the "purification of units and the sending of those contaminated into detention or into isolated disciplinary units". This consisted of an internal army purge organised by military authorities, and the prosecution of civilian and military participants in the mutiny and in the VNQDĐ uprising at large by the relevant civilian authorities. The judicial action occurred through the Criminal Commission of Tonkin, created by Governor General Pasquier on 12 February, and presided over by Jules Bride. It convened five times in four different places during 1930. It prosecuted 547 individuals, soldiers and civilians alike, and handed down 80 death sentences (not all of which were enacted), 102 life sentences of forced labour, 243 deportations, 37 sentences of forced labour for 20 years, six shorter sentences of forced labour, two lifelong detentions, and one term detention for 20 years. There were 18 acquittals, and 58 accused individuals could not be prosecuted due to lack of evidence. In addition to the Criminal Commission, provincial tribunals were also involved in the legal procedures. The prisoners who were deported were sent to places such as the island penal colony of Poulo Condore off the coast of southern Vietnam, or to French Guiana to join other prisoners from events such at the Thai Nguyen uprising of 1917, where a prison camp was being used to clear land for economic development.

The largest number of death penalties were handed down by the first Criminal Commission, which had convened at Yen Bay on 27 February, just 17 days after the attacks, to try those implicated in the mutiny and nearby insurrections. The Criminal Commission was actually a military court that held proceedings in makeshift chambers in the barracks. Some of the accused military personnel defended themselves on the reasoning that they had been "surprised and forced to take part in the insurrection". The other defendants, military or civilian, accepted full responsibility for all actions, including for those of the men under their command, while some others denied any involvement. Some mid-level leaders admitted to carrying out the actions in question but said that they did not constitute crimes but duties to the country or party and therefore did not constitute personal fault. Alternatively, they submitted that they were following orders and therefore not responsible. In contrast, Hoc described himself as a professional revolutionary and took responsibility for the entire campaign. He presented himself as the VNQDĐ leader and then gave a political speech about the VNQDD's objectives and why non-violent lobbying was ineffective, before being cut off by the presiding judge. At various times, the high-ranking VNQDD members mixed anti-colonial rhetoric based on anecdotes of prior anti-Chinese and anti-French warriors, with French history and political thought regarding civil rights, which according to Luong, showed the influence of French education on the political base of the VNQDD. He cited the examples of Hoc—who used terms such as equality and liberty repeatedly—and that of the sister of Hoc's fiancée, who said the colonial situation was unjust and inconsistent with the French esteem for Joan of Arc. Among the 87 people found guilty at Yen Bay, 46 were servicemen. Of those convicted, 39 were sentenced to death, five to deportation, 33 to life sentences of forced labour, nine to 20 years, and one to five years of forced labour. Among those condemned to death, 24 were civilians and 15 were servicemen. In a session of the Criminal Commission at Phu Tho, some defendants were sentenced to life exile in other French colonies for donating as little as 100 piasters to the cause, even though in some of these cases, the authorities admitted they could not prove the defendants were members of the VNQDD.

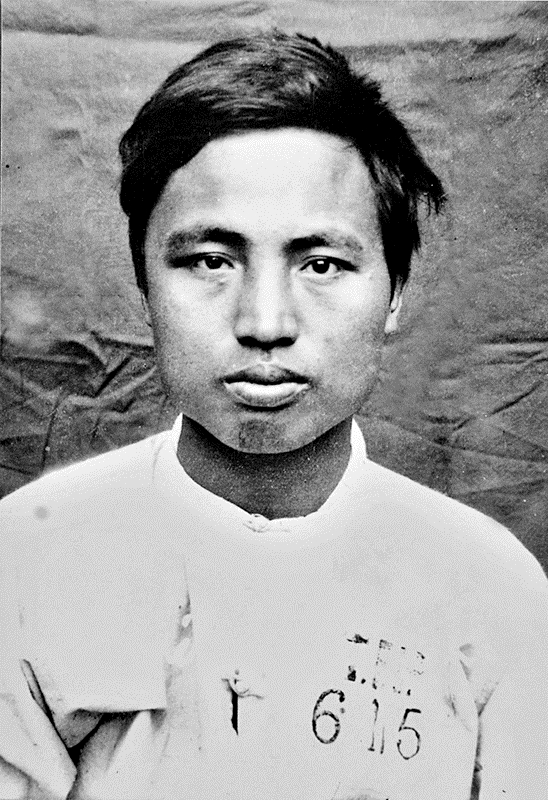
Nguyễn Thái Học, leader of the VNQDĐ, was executed for his role in leading the uprising.

Hoc and others in the leadership group—with the exception of Chinh—tried to appeal their death sentences to the Council of the Protectorate, and after this failed, they sought clemency. Immediately after the large number of death sentences were handed down and while the appeals and clemency requests were being considered, there was vigorous debate over the appropriateness of the judicial measures. Those associated with the colonial regime in Vietnam strongly advocated harsh punishments and a further expansion of power, while domestic authorities in France took a more moderate stance in public due to the presence of leftist political movements. In contrast, Vietnamese public servants disagreed with the opinions of their French colonial supervisors. In March 1930, M Borel, the French delegate to the High Council of Colonies from northern Vietnam called a meeting of local officials with the intention of using it as a show of political support for granting wider powers to colonial authorities to crack down on pro-independence activities. However, this backfired, as the Vietnamese bureaucrats had already unanimously agreed beforehand at a meeting of the Tonkin Chamber of Representatives beforehand to raise the issues of the punitive bombing of Co Am and the death penalty. When the meeting occurred with Borel, they opposed a motion to increase the authority of French officials and opposed a motion to endorse the sentences handed down by the military courts, having tried to delay proceedings with time-wasting speeches. They also called for more Vietnamese participation in the colonial army, and the rescission of the blacklisting of various students from serving in government posts in future for past political agitation. Eventually the local bureaucrats walked out and the French officials voted to increase the powers of the Governor-General of Indochina, purportedly allowing him to review capital punishment cases without requiring final approval from Paris. This motion was not binding on the central government in Paris but was reported widely in the media in both France and Vietnam.

In France, the severity of the sentences led to a campaign by the French Communist Party, the French Human Rights League (FHRL) and to various demonstrations by Vietnamese expatriates. At the time, more than 1,500 Vietnamese students were resident in France, particularly in Paris. On 22 May 1930, more than 1,000 demonstrated outside Élysée Palace against the French reaction to Yen Bay. The police arrested 47 and eventually deported 17 back to Vietnam, where most of them engaged in communist anti-colonial activities. This occurred in defiance of a court order that deemed the government's charges against them to be unfounded, and led to combative debate in the National Assembly between the Communist and Socialist Parties on one side and the conservative majority on the other.

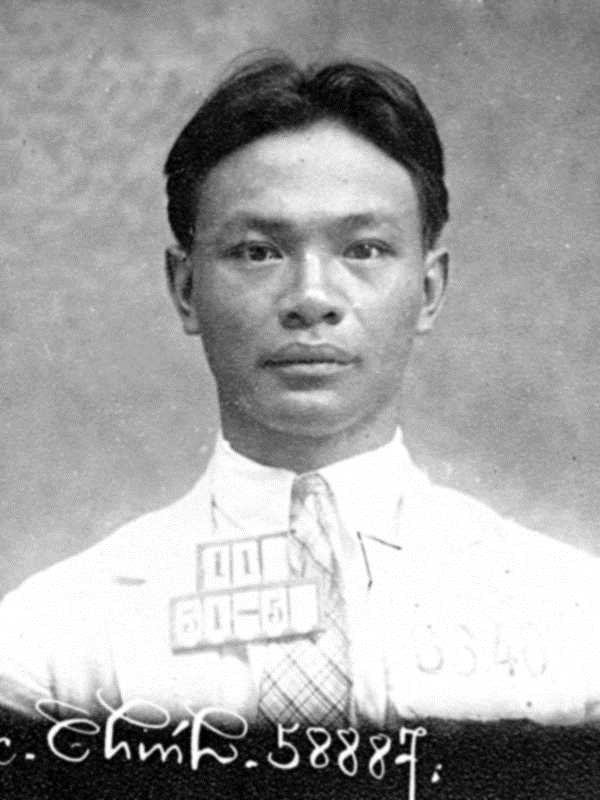
Phó Đức Chính – one of commanders of Vietnamese Revolutionary Army (Việt-nam Cách-mạng Quân).

Due to the high number of death sentences handed down, the Minister of Colonies intervened with Governor-General Pasquier, so that no execution could be performed unless the case had been reviewed by a pardoning commission. The presidential pardon reduced the quantity of death penalties pronounced at the first Criminal Commission at Yen Bay from 39 to 13. Pardon was refused only to those who had killed a French officer, warrant officer, or a native soldier. The civilians benefited proportionately more from this intervention, as the enlisted soldiers had been responsible for most of the killings at Yen Bay. Among the 13 who were guillotined on 17 June 1930 were the top VNQDĐ leaders, Hoc and Chinh. The condemned men cried "Viet Nam!" as they were to be executed. Hoc's fiancée committed suicide later on the same day. Hoc made a last plea to the French in the form of a letter. In it, he claimed that he had always wanted to cooperate with the authorities, but that French intransigence had forced him to revolt. He contended that if France wanted to stay in Indochina, then it would have to drop policies that he termed as brutal, and become more amiable towards Vietnamese people. He called for the introduction of universal education, training in commerce and industry and an end to the corruption of the French-installed mandarins. The magazine Phu Nu Tan Van (Women’s News) disseminated pictures of the condemned VNQDĐ members in one of their issues, raising the stature of the revolutionaries in death.

The punitive bombing of Co Am also led to criticism of the French government. The central government in Paris defended the actions of their officials in Vietnam, citing prior instances in 1912, 1917 and 1920 when airstrikes were used to suppress anti-colonial revolts while minimising regime casualties. Resident Superior Robin strongly defended his policy of airstrikes, saying that as it was well known that the populace was hostile to French authority, it was pointless to risk French casualties, which he felt would embolden nationalist morale. He said:

In my reasoning, it was important to inflict on the bandits and those sheltering them a quick and exemplary lesson. I judged that only a punishment capable of terrifying those tempted to participate in the rebellion could totally reassure the sane and peaceful elements of the population regarding our will to defend French sovereignty in that land and to stop the movement cold.

The FHRL also raised the issue of the punitive house-burning in Son Duong, corresponding with the Ministry of Colonies regarding the legality of the property damage. The FHRL claimed that the burning of dwellings was punishable by death under both Vietnamese and French law. In 1932, the Ministry of Colonies responded and said that the burnings were done with the approval of village elders. The response followed a similar line of deterrence reasoning to the justification for the airstrikes on Co Am. It said "Any other method would have been considered a sign of weakness ... it would have led us not to the destruction of a few thatch houses, but to the use of arms and the sacrifice of a much larger number of people under our protection who might have been drawn into that movement".

There were also penalties enacted against the French officers whose neglectful behaviour had contributed to the mutiny at Yen Bay. Resident Superior Robin released Resident Massimi from his duties immediately after the mutiny. No punishment was handed down to Commandant Le Tacon, the main person responsible for the security at Yen Bay which had failed to stop the mutiny. Neither Robin nor General Aubert, who were ultimately accountable for the failures of their subordinates, were punished. The former remained in Indochina as governor general until retiring in 1936. Aubert returned to France when his three-year term ended in the autumn of 1930.

General Commandant Superior Aubert, who had been so lenient towards Le Tacon, organised an internal army purge in parallel with the trials of the Criminal Commissions. Its objectives were to reassert control over the native armed forces in Tonkin by identifying, penalising, isolating, and re-educating disloyal troops, thereby setting an example to the others. According to Patrice Morlat, "545 tirailleurs and warrant officers were the object of sanctions: 164 were transferred into disciplinary companies in Tonkin, 94 to Africa..., 57 were handed over to the civilian jurisdiction, and 160 were reduced to the ranks and put on leave without pay." Such remedial actions demonstrated the level of infiltration of the army, and clearly showed that the predominant culpability for the mutiny was seen to be placed squarely on the Vietnamese. In contrast with the first phase of suppression of the VNQDD in 1929, when 121 soldiers suspected of having VNQDĐ membership were punished and 40 put under investigation by the Sûreté, the measures taken after Yen Bay were far more extensive and harsh. More than 500 out of Tonkin's 12,000 indigenous soldiers, a percentage of 4.5%, were punished by the military, demonstrating the extent to which Vietnamese soldiers in the north were seen to be involved in activities contrary to their military duty.

At a more general social level, French authorities took a more stringent line towards any activities that could be considered pro-independence. The writing of pro-VNQDD songs were met with detention orders, and many village-level associations were banned due to fears they could be used for political organising.

Many villages heavily affected by the mutiny and the subsequent crackdown saw a sudden increase in conversions to Catholicism, as many hoped that French priests would lobby the authorities for the sentences imposed on their friends and relatives to be reduced. Over the following decade, the proportion of Catholics in Phu Tho Province rose to 14%.

In 1936, the leftist Popular Front came to power, resulting in a wave of sentence reductions, albeit with parole conditions that forced them to stay in their villages and periodically report to local authorities. There was also an increase in attempts to deter nationalist activists by attempting to give them low-level jobs in the administration, but this policy was not very successful.

== Impact on colonial rule ==
The impact of the mutiny on French rule was minimal, in the short and long term. The military casualties inflicted on the French army in the attack were in single figures and the attack did not generate widespread awareness among the populace, as the intended popular uprising did not occur. Instead, the attack backfired and saw a large number of VNQDĐ members killed, captured or executed. The subsequent French military and civilian crackdown saw military security increase and the VNQDĐ's ability to threaten French authority in Vietnam was extinguished. The vast majority of the leadership were killed or sentenced to death, and the remnants of the VNQDĐ fled to China, where several factions emerged under disparate leadership. In the long run, Yên Bái allowed the Indochinese Communist Party of Ho Chi Minh to inherit the VNQDĐ's status as the leading anti-colonial revolutionary movement. After the Second World War, an opportunity to fight for Vietnamese independence arose, and this allowed the communists in the Viet Minh to dictate the platform of the independence movement. As a result, the communists were able to position themselves to become the dominant force in Vietnam post-independence.

== Military reforms precipitated by the mutiny ==
The mutiny refocused attention on the long term tension over the use of Indochinese soldiers, and on the ways in which it could be resolved. The tension could be traced back to the creation of French Indochina. Cochinchina, the European term for southern Vietnam, had been colonised in 1867 and the remaining parts of Vietnam, Tonkin and Annam, the northern and central regions were conquered in 1883. Nominally, only Cochinchina was a colony, while Tonkin, Annam, Cambodia and Laos were protectorates which together comprised French Indochina. The problem centred around the French reliance on native soldiers to maintain colonial control. This need was problematic because Indo-Chinese soldiers were both enforcers of colonial order and colonial subjects. This created constant French concerns about their loyalty. Despite several attempts to deal with the issue, the basic tension between the need for and suspicion of native troops could never be entirely resolved. The need for forces to pacify the countryside was too pressing to do without them. As a result, the tension resurfaced at regular intervals, either due to proposals to improve the position of Indochinese soldiers in the army, or after a mutiny had raised question marks about the loyalty of the soldiers.

=== Background of Vietnamese troops in the French colonial army ===
The demand for Indochinese soldiers, auxiliaries first, and then regular troops, had been present since the beginning of French conquest. French troops were never numerically sufficient to assert control of the populace and then maintain Pax Gallica in the colony, thus requiring local reinforcements. French troops were too expensive compared to the substantially cheaper native troops. A lack of manpower back in Europe caused by other imperial programs and heavy casualties in World War I on the Western Front further caused a need for the recruitment of Indochinese troops. Because French Indochina was a domination and exploitation colony rather than a settler colony, there were insufficient local Frenchmen to build a settler-army. Native troops generally knew local conditions better, and could be used in terrain on which foreign troops were disadvantaged. Particularly after 1915, French Indochina was expected to financially contribute to the defence of the colony and even to send native troops to France.

The indigenous soldiers fulfilled a number of different purposes. Initially they were collaborators in the conquest of Indochina, helping to defeat the forces of the Nguyễn dynasty and then in its pacification. After the pacification campaign was officially completed in 1897, the two main functions of the colonial army were the maintenance of internal peace and external security. Both these tasks were fulfilled in conjunction with other armed institutions, such as the Garde indigène (later indochinoise), the gendarmerie, the police, and the irregular partisans in the border regions. The Garde indigène, a paramilitary force, was primarily responsible for dealing with disturbances of the peace and thus played an important role in the repression of public demonstrations and popular unrest.

The participation of native soldiers in the colonial forces was used as political symbolism, proof that the Union's five territories were rightfully under French tutelage. This was the "blood toll" to be paid for the Pax Gallica. In their position as colonisers and colonial subjects, the native colonial troops were also buffers between the French and the unarmed populace. Their presence demonstrated French control and power to the ordinary population, deterring those who intended to violently overthrow French rule. The dilemma was that the French needed local soldiers to maintain their authority, but could not rely on them too deeply because of an innate fear that they would rebel or desert. This concern was deeply institutionalized in the army in the form of "safe" ratios of "white" and "yellow" soldiers, the segregation of the army, and barriers excluding Vietnamese from becoming officers until 1929. The mutiny triggered the long existing fears about the loyalty of native soldiers, as well as many traditional French responses.

=== Transfer of soldiers ===
Soldiers in Tonkin (areas coloured red, orange and yellow), were transferred after the uprising.

In addition to the individual military punishments, the army took further internal measures to lower the risk of another insurrection. According to Maurice Rives, 10,000 Vietnamese troops were given transfers to different zones. This meant that more than 80% of Tonkin's approximately 12,000 Tirailleurs Tonkinois were moved, a transfer of enormous proportions, indicating the extent of insecurity among French commanders towards Vietnamese troops, and the extent to which they were willing to go to make future Yên Báis impossible. One possible rationale for this measure was to break up any undiscovered VNQDĐ cells and to sever personal ties, within units and between soldiers and civilians in their local district. The mass transfer of soldiers also had the effect of creating a state of constant mobilisation, denying troops the time and opportunity for anti-colonial organisation.

Aside from measures in Vietnam, 2,000 Indochinese soldiers returning from service in France were sent on indefinite leave and were not replaced with new recruits from Vietnam. The reason is put down by historians to be due to the fact that military discipline in France was less regimented than in Indochina and other colonial garrisons. In colonial units, the colonial military and social order with Frenchmen above their colonised troops was more easily reproduced. Metropolitan officers also treated their Vietnamese subordinates on a more equitable basis, making the Vietnamese less likely to accept the discrimination upon return to Vietnam. Overseas Vietnamese soldiers could become so alienated with their experiences that they became soft targets for communist propaganda. Upon returning home, they attempted to indoctrinate other troops with their Marxist doctrine. This train of thought further reinforced French perception that subversive ideas came from the outside rather than domestically: of the 57 soldiers involved in the mutiny, 17 had served abroad. On the other hand, according to the Thiry report, the proportion of soldiers with foreign service at Yên Bái did not exceed that in other garrisons, so this was not abnormal.

=== Military intelligence reforms ===
In addition to punishing soldiers, tightening dismissal regulations and reducing the number of Vietnamese servicemen in France, the French decided to improve the military intelligence service. This was to be achieved by strengthening military intelligence through closer coordination with the Sûreté, and by raising internal standards. An inquiry into the mutiny at showed that cooperation between Resident Massimi and Commandant Le Tacon did not exist despite multiple requests, and that it was partly responsible for the uprising. The relationship between the civilian and military authorities were traditionally poor, but Yên Bái stood out in the total lack of military-civilian cooperation. Further VNQDĐ conspiracies to foment mutinies in other garrisons, such as Kiến An, were detected and scotched at late notice. It was decided that the teamwork with the Sûreté had to be raised to greater heights to prevent future Yên Bái style rebellions. The rebellion allowed the civilian authorities an opportunity to involve themselves in military matters.

The Sûreté's indirect penetration of military affairs involved linking the military intelligence service (SRM) to the Sûreté and the information provided by it, thereby making itself dependent on the political information and even political judgement and agenda of the civilian authorities. The central SRM then relayed this information to its local branches as part of its SRM Bulletin. As a result of the uprising, the SRM became more closely linked to the Sûreté and its methodology and philosophy in of analysing Vietnamese anti-colonial activity. It was further resolved to have all officers involved in studying revolutionary parties. The focus widened from observing only internal army activities to include developments among Vietnamese anti-colonial organisations at large. General Aubert cited complacency and laziness as a factor in the ineffectiveness of the officers in implementing French intelligence strategy. He further asserted that the flow of intelligence between French officers and Vietnamese warrant officers was not as smooth as desired. He felt that his men were often not tactful and discreet enough; citing a lack of language skills or interest in talking to their Vietnamese colleagues in an attempt to extract information. Aubert also believed that the Vietnamese troops were effective in hiding their anti-colonial sentiments from their French colleagues.

In addition to the measures intended to help identify, isolate or eliminate soldiers of suspect loyalty, the regulations for dismissal were liberalised. A decree of 8 April 1930 permitted the General Commandant Superior "to discharge those soldiers who had been the object of convictions in excess of three months imprisonment by a military tribunal, or who would have rendered themselves guilty of activities contrary to military duty".

=== Vietnamese language skills of French officers ===
Aubert's notice stressed the importance of close contact between French officers and their Vietnamese warrant officers in order to improve the quality of intelligence, but did not discuss whether this also required French officers to improve their Vietnamese language skills. The annual report of 1930 considered the language barrier was a problem. The report mentioned creating a Vietnamese studies centre in France to increase the proportion of Vietnamese-speaking French officers to enhance direct communication with their Vietnamese subordinates. However, the report principally had in mind the use of language skills as a tool of command to reinforce hierarchical relationships.

The report also considered using specialised Vietnamese language skills as a means of gathering intelligence and to control the minds of Vietnamese troops, but discarded it, citing that infiltration and clandestine anti-colonial techniques were rendering them irrelevant. The report thus concluded that deeper specialisation would not improve intelligence, and that a degree of expertise – to improve command skills – was all that one would need.

The report further argued that excessive specialization would be counterproductive and thus detrimental because it required long tours in Indochina, which was deemed to be detrimental to the health of the specialist. It also aired suspicions that specialists became too trusting towards their Vietnamese subordinates, to the extent of becoming indigenophiles. Finally, specialisation was said to be detrimental because it would not only make Vietnamese troops more secretive, but would very likely improve their organisational abilities, since they would need to "take even more precautions".

=== Decrease in the proportion of Vietnamese troops ===
The French reaction to the mutiny included military punishments, new regulations, SRM institutional reform, reductions in the numbers of Vietnamese serving or working in France and increased specialisation amongst the units making up the garrison of Indochina. While these were wide-ranging changes, the military and civilian authorities did not judge them sufficient for the reassertion of control over their colonial troops. A further four decisions were implemented, aimed at establishing a stable racial balance amongst the troops in French Indochina. The number of ethnic Vietnamese soldiers was perceived as being too great. A change in recruitment and retention numbers was introduced, aimed at altering the overall ratios of troops in Indochina to a roughly equivalent proportion of one ethnic Vietnamese to each European regular or indigenous ethnic minority (Montagnards) soldier.

The first of the four measures aimed at increasing the dependability of Vietnamese soldiers was intended to revise the ethnic proportions of the troops making up each garrison. The lack of European troops at Yên Bái had been cited as a factor in the mutiny (although it had been suppressed by Vietnamese tirailleurs who remained loyal to their French officers). The decision reversed a major reorganisation of the army that had been initiated by General Aubert in 1928.

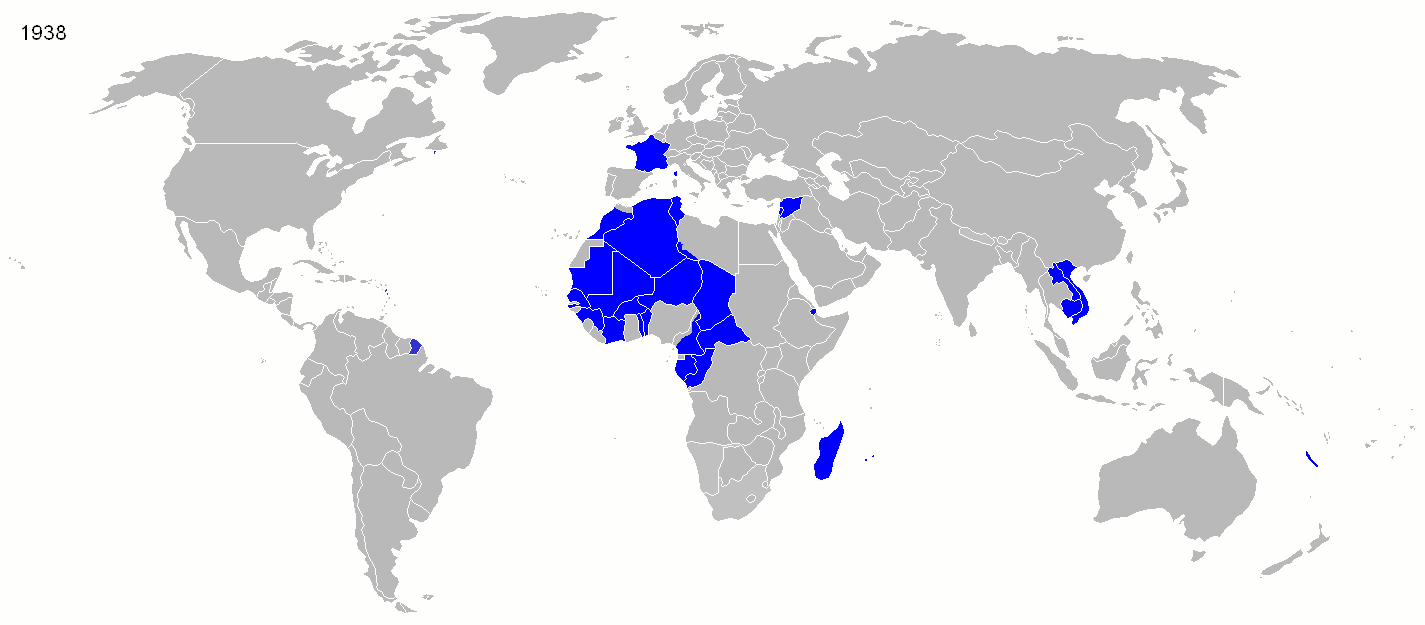
The authorities considered replacing Vietnamese soldiers with troops from North Africa, where France had its largest colonial possessions.

The most sweeping proposal was that made by Resident Superior Robin who wanted to "completely and radically abolish all regiments of Tirailleurs tonkinois (Vietnamese infantry) serving in the delta and the middle regions" and replace them with "white [Foreign] Legion or even North African battalions". This proposal was rejected by General Aubert, and eventually Governor General Pasquier adopted a compromise arrangement, which saw the disbandment of one regiment of Tirailleurs Tonkinois. Policy strategists calculated that this reduction in Vietnamese troops could be made up by a concomitant increase in the number of European and ethnic minority troops.

The third decision involved the "[r]einforcement of the occupation corps by three white battalions: one Foreign Legion battalion, [and] two Colonial Infantry battalions". Since it was decided that the overall number of troops in Indochina could not be reduced for external defence reasons, this necessitated the replacement of at least the two disbanded Vietnamese battalions.

Prior to the mutiny, the Department of War in Paris had clearly indicated that it would not be able "to provide for one more European battalion in Indochina under the 1931 Budget" due to fiscal constraints, manpower shortages and organisational problems. The unrest generated by the Yên Bái mutiny motivated the political will to send more European (French and Foreign Legion) troops to French Indochina. Aside from replacing two Vietnamese battalions with three European battalions, the French authorities also increased the number of ethnic minority soldiers serving in the locally recruited colonial regiments. As such, the "[i]ntensification of recruitment of non-Annamite indigenous people: Thos, Laotians, Mois, Cambodians was decided." The aim was to increase the non-Vietnamese percentage to 50% of the total of locally recruited troops.

== Memory ==
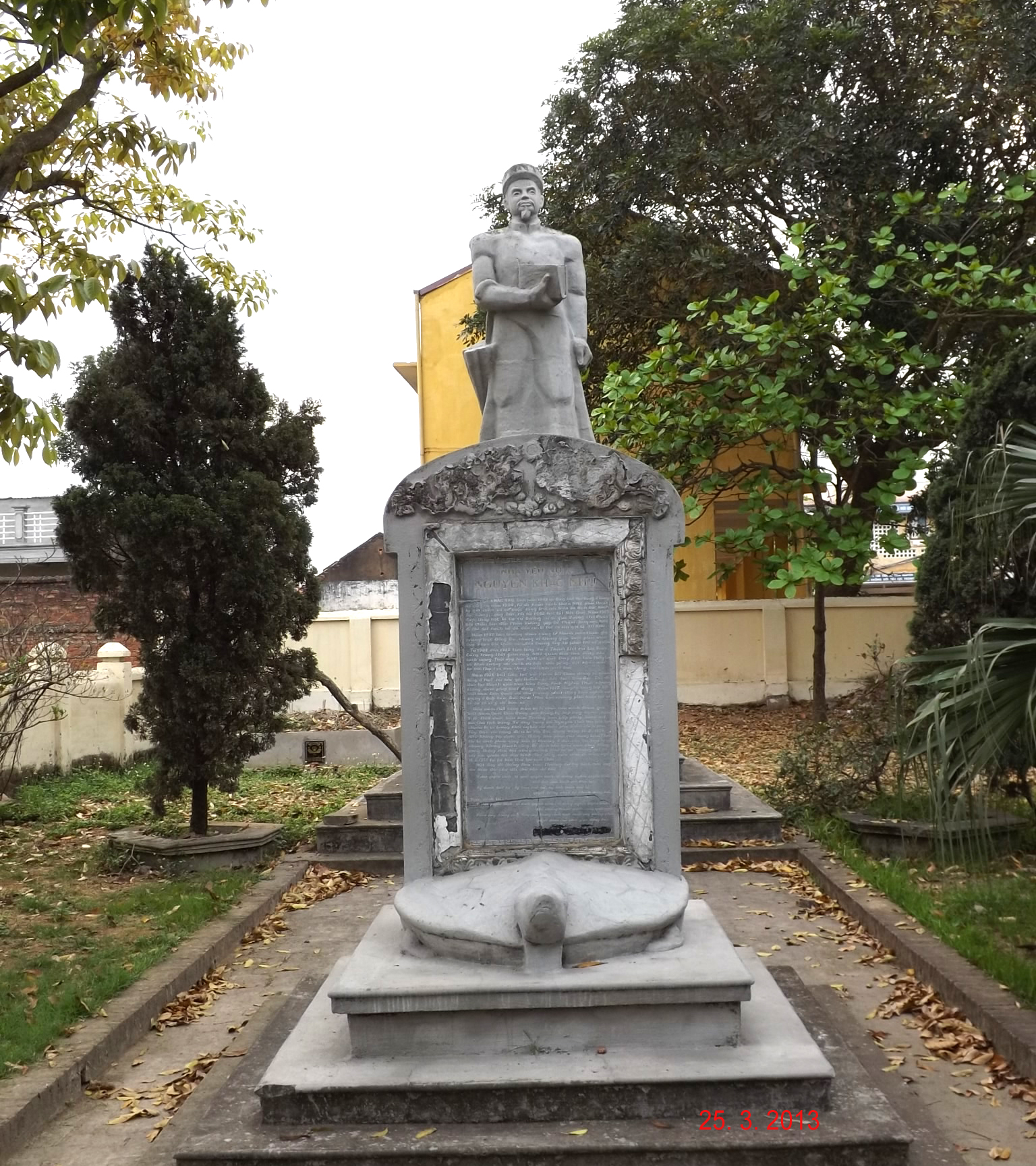
Statue of martyr Nguyễn Khắc Nhu

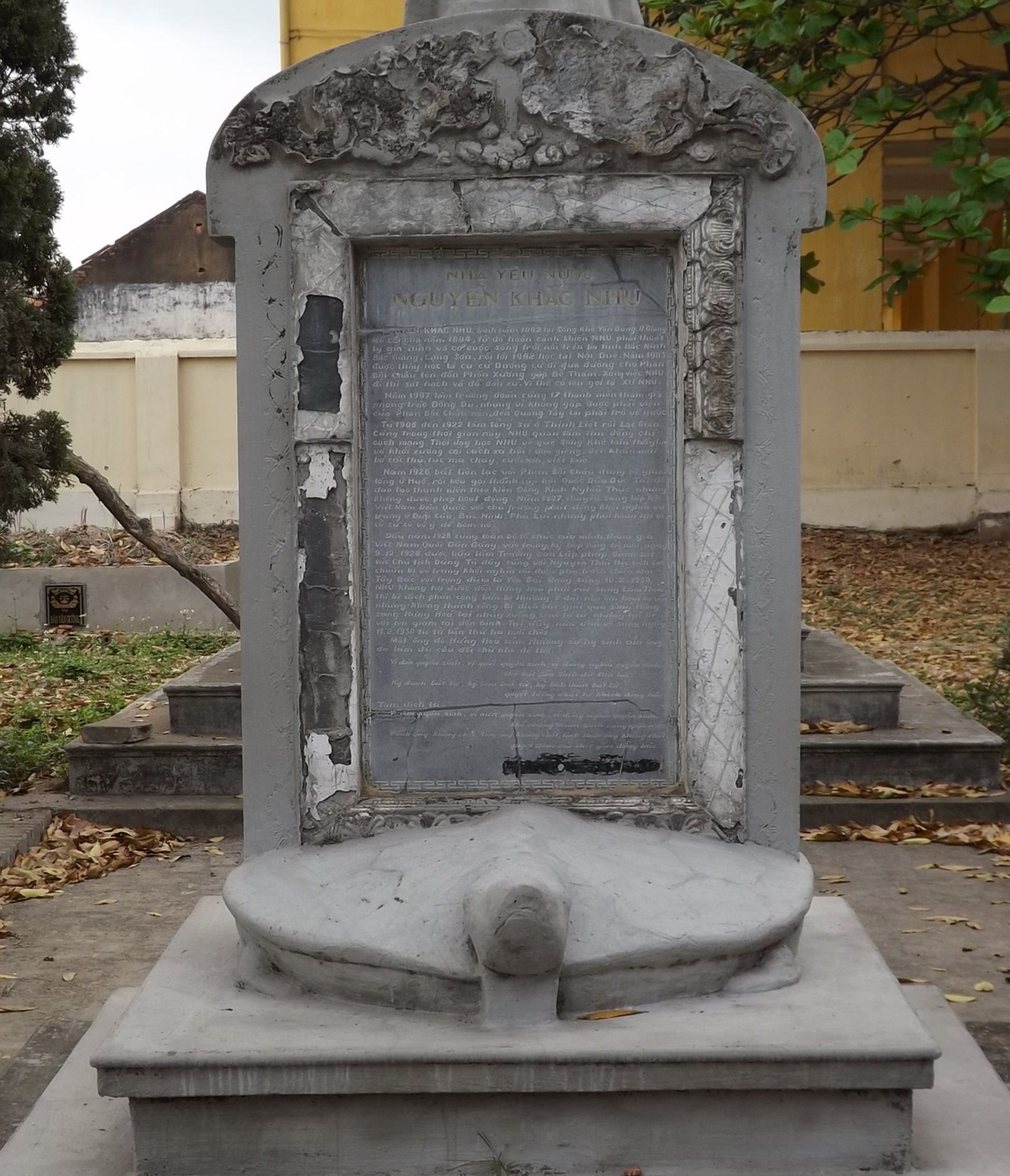
Stele about martyr Nguyễn Khắc Nhu

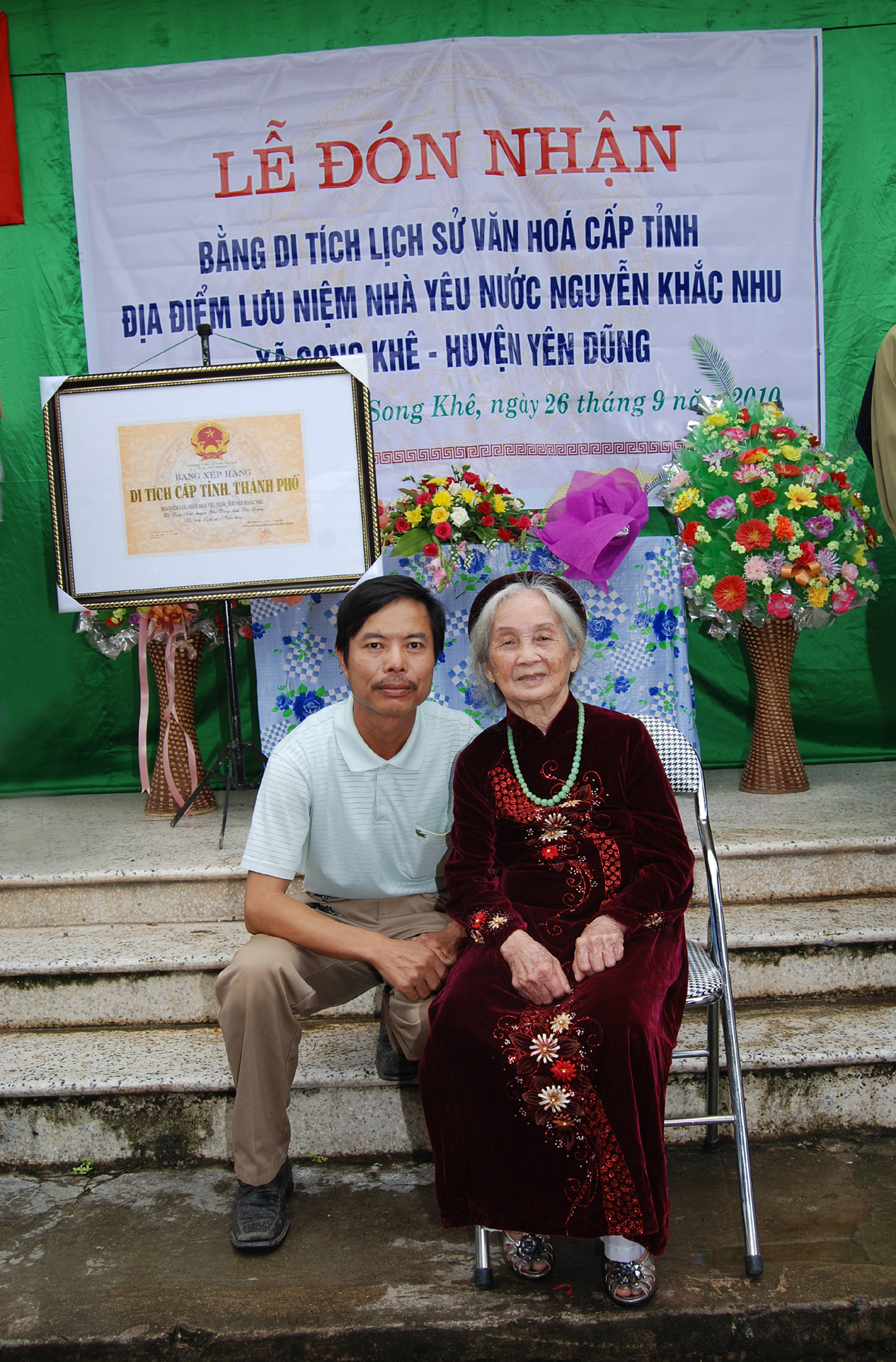
Daughter of Mr Nhu

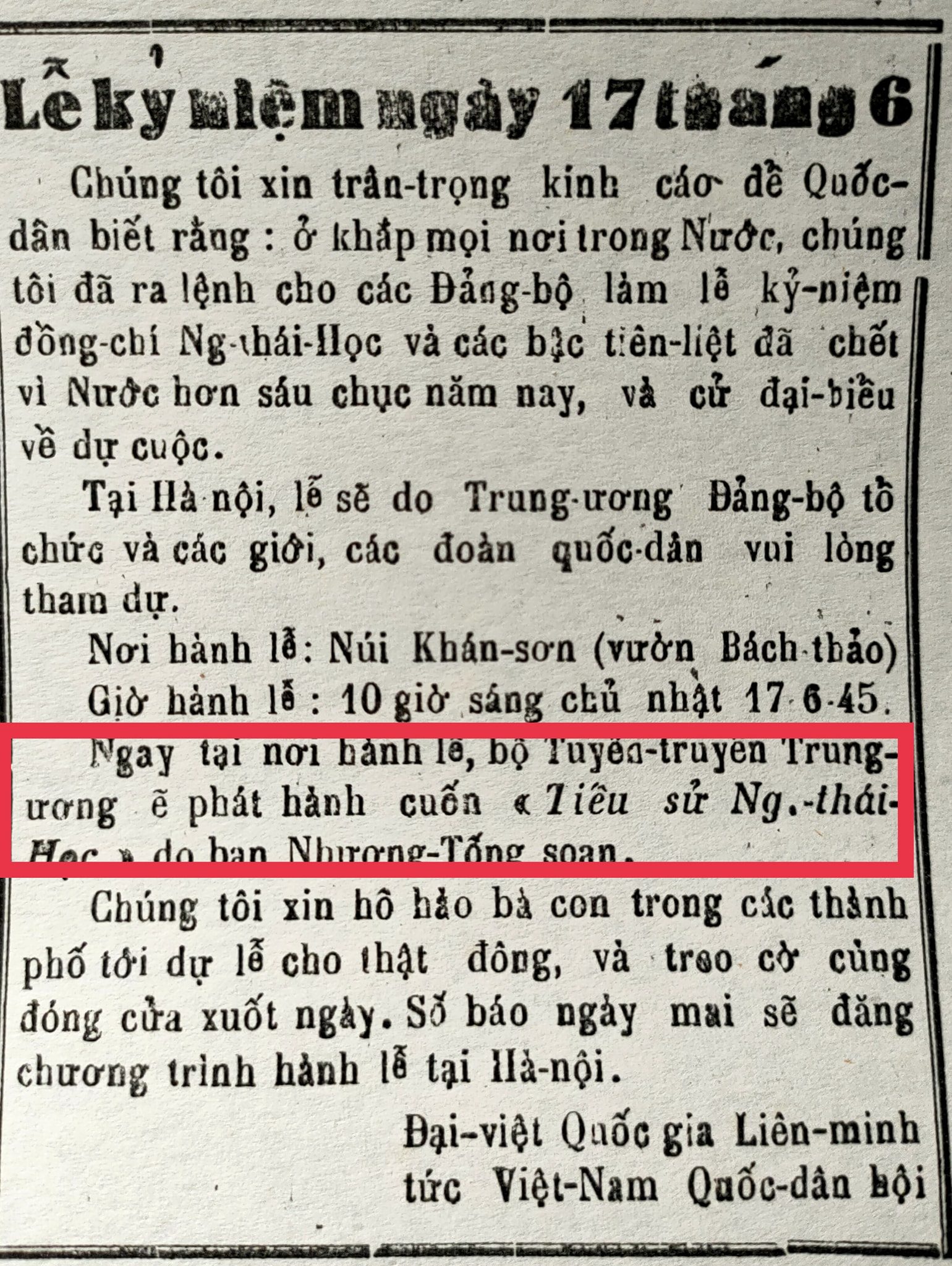
The celebration of June 17, Empire of Vietnam regime, 1945

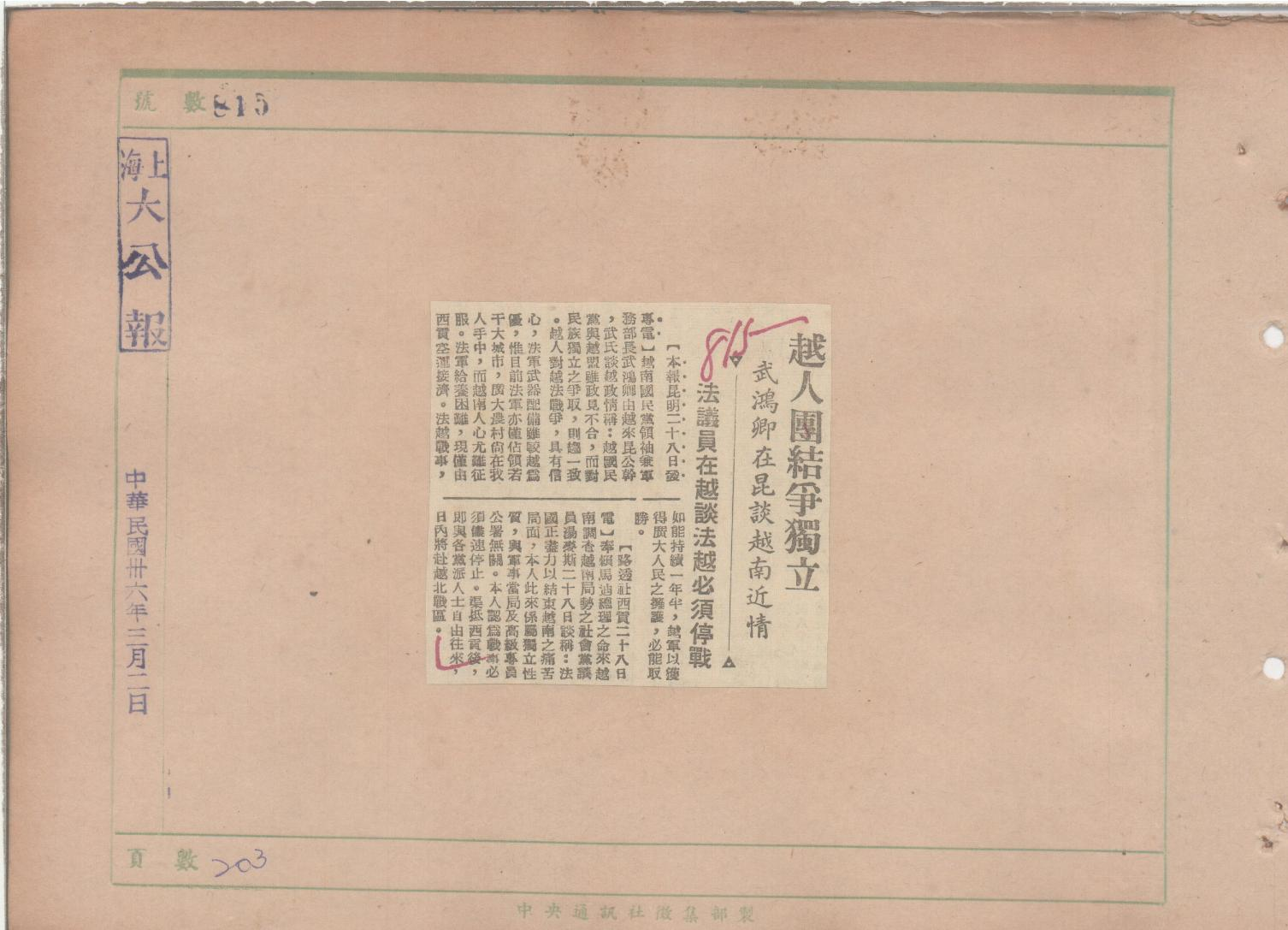
Chinese article reported that revolutionary Vũ Hồng Khanh escaped after the revolution was defeated

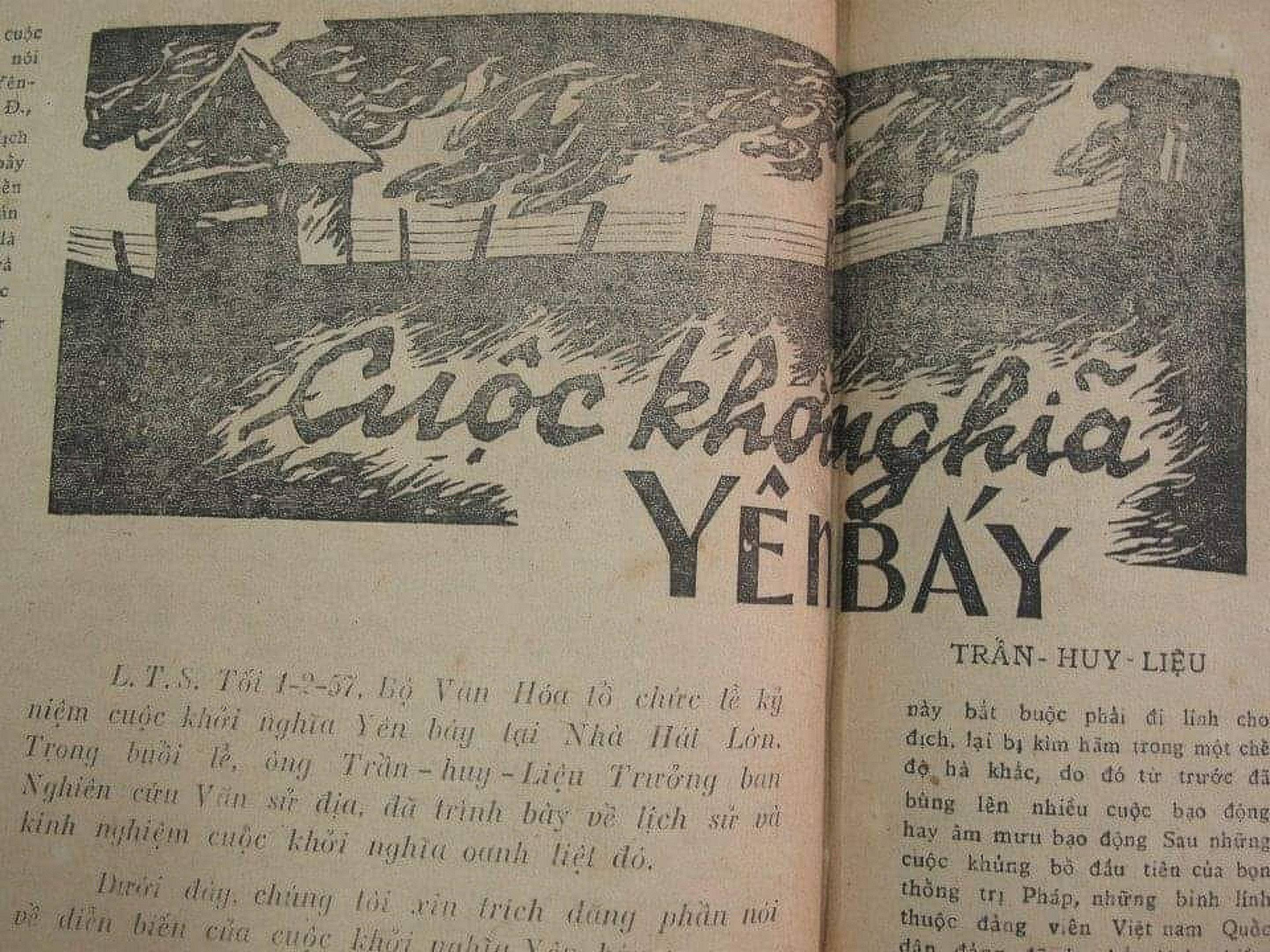
A celebration article by historian Trần Huy Liệu in Hanoi, 1957

== See also ==
- Military reforms resulting from the Yên Bái mutiny
