= Assassination of Alfred François Bazin =

1929 murder in colonial Vietnam

The assassination of Alfred François Bazin (French: [bazɛ̃]), a French labour recruiter in Hanoi, colonial Vietnam on February 9, 1929 marked the beginning of the demise of the Vietnamese Nationalist Party (VNQDĐ), which perpetrated the killing. The resulting French retribution severely weakened the fledgling Vietnamese revolutionary movement and hampered its ability to undermine colonial rule.

== Biography ==
The first account of the affair is Paul Monet's Les Jauniers: Histoire Vraie (Paris, 1930). Monet was a wounded French war veteran who visited Vietnam and became incensed by the treatment of workers by his countrymen. He coined the contemptuous term "jaunier" (Yellow-slave-trader) from "négrier", African slave-trader. According to Monet, Bazin was a graduate of the École coloniale in Paris, who had served as a colonial official before becoming a supervisor of labour recruitment in French Indochina.

Since 1883, Vietnam had been a colony of France and along with Laos and Cambodia was part of French Indochina. Under the direction of Bazin and other such labour recruiters, Vietnamese foremen were hired to recruit Vietnamese laborers to work on plantations. In some cases, the hired work-force would be utilised in southern Vietnam, which the French ruled as the colony of Cochinchina. Others were sent to distant French colonies such as the New Hebrides. The working conditions in which the Vietnamese were placed generated indignation. The methods of recruitment often included beating or coercion, as the foreman received a commission for each recruit. The living conditions were poor and the remuneration was low. Among the Vietnamese population, the perception was that those recruited would never set eyes on their homeland again. The French colonial authorities refused to intervene, claiming both that recruitment "had no official character"; and that recruitment was beneficial to the Vietnamese, since it eased the population pressure on the crowded Red River Delta in northern Vietnam.

== Death ==
Alfred Bazin had come to symbolize the abuses of the recruitment system amongst the Annamite workers involved. Within the VNQDĐ, which had then been in existence for two years, a group led by Nguyễn Văn Viên suggested assassinating Alfred Bazin. Nguyễn Thái Học, the leader of the VNQDĐ, felt that the killing of individuals was pointless and that it would only prompt a crackdown by the Sûreté générale indochinoise that would weaken the party. He felt that it was better to work towards the overthrow of the French colonial system of which Bazin was merely a minor tool. Having been turned down by the VNQDĐ leaders, Nguyen Văn Viên made his own plan. With the help of an accomplice, this individual shot and killed Bazin as he was leaving the home of his mistress Germaine Carcelle at 110 route de Huế on February 9, 1929. Although the status of the assassins within the VNQDĐ was uncertain, the killing of Bazin was seen as the first major attack carried out by the movement.

== French reaction ==
As predicted by Nguyễn Thái Học, the French authorities reacted by apprehending all known members of the VNQDĐ that they could track down, including a young naturalised Frenchman named Léon Sanh. Sanh confessed to the crime, but he later retracted it, claiming only to be a bystander. He later implicated Nguyễn Văn Viên as his alleged accomplice. Viên was then captured, but later committed suicide in prison. The sources disagree, but between three and four hundred men were rounded up. Of those seized, 36 were government clerks, 13 were officials in the French government, 36 were schoolteachers, 39 were merchants, 37 were landowners and 40 were military personnel. Eventually 78 men were convicted and sentenced to between five and twenty years in prison. Léon Sanh himself was acquitted. As a result of the arrests, the VNQDĐ leadership was severely depleted. Most of the Central Committee were captured, and Học and Nguyễn Khắc Nhu were among the few who managed to escape from the hideout at the Vietnam Hotel.

The pressure under which the VNQDĐ was placed eventually led it to engage in overt violent struggle. This culminated in the Yên Bái mutiny of 1930, which resulted in a large section of the party being executed by the French authorities, decapacitating it as a major threat to the colonial order.

== Bibliography ==
- Duiker, William (1976). The Rise of Nationalism in Vietnam, 1900–1941. Ithaca: Cornell University. pp. 160–161. ISBN 0-8014-0951-9.

21.0147°N 105.8516°E
