= Việt Nam Quốc Dân Đảng =

Vietnamese nationalist and democratic socialist political party (1927–1975)

Vietnamese Nationalist Party Việt Nam Quốc Dân Đảng
- Abbreviation: VNQDĐ
- Leader: Nguyễn Thái Học; Nhất Linh; Vũ Hồng Khanh
- Founder: Nguyễn Thái Học
- Founded: 25 December 1927; 98 years ago
- Dissolved: 30 April 1975; 51 years ago
- Newspaper: Tiếng dân (People's Voice); Việt Nam; Chính nghĩa
- Ideology: Vietnamese nationalism; Democratic socialism; Faction: Three Principles of the People
- Slogan: "National independence, civil rights and freedoms, people's well-being."
- Anthem: "Cờ sao trắng" (lit. 'The White Star Flag')

Party flag

Website
- vietquoc.org vietquoc.com

The Việt Nam Quốc Dân Đảng (Vietnamese: [vìət naːm kwə́wk zən ɗa᷉ːŋ]; chữ Hán: 越南國民黨; lit. 'Vietnamese Nationals' Party'), also known as the Vietnamese Nationalist Party and abbreviated VNQDĐ, was a nationalist and democratic socialist political group that sought independence from French colonial rule in Vietnam during the early 20th century. Its origins lie in a group of young Hanoi-based intellectuals who began publishing revolutionary material in the mid-1920s. In 1927, after the publishing house failed because of French harassment and censorship, the VNQDĐ was formed under the leadership of Nguyễn Thái Học. Modelling itself on the Kuomintang of Nationalist China (chữ Hán: 國民黨) the VNQDĐ gained a small following among northerners, particularly teachers and intellectuals. The party, which was less successful among peasants and industrial workers, was organised in small clandestine cells.

From 1928, the VNQDĐ attracted attention through its assassinations of French officials and Vietnamese collaborators. A turning point came in February 1929 with the Bazin assassination, the killing of a French labour recruiter widely despised by local Vietnamese people. Although the perpetrators' precise affiliation was unclear, the French colonial authorities held the VNQDĐ responsible. Between 300 and 400 of the party's approximately 1,500 members were detained in the resulting crackdown. Many of the leaders were arrested, but Học managed to escape.

In late 1929, the party was weakened by an internal split. Under increasing French pressure the VNQDĐ leadership switched tactics, replacing a strategy of isolated clandestine attacks against individuals with a plan to expel the French in a single blow with a large-scale popular uprising. After stockpiling home-made weapons, the VNQDĐ launched the Yên Bái mutiny on February 10, 1930, with the aim of sparking a widespread revolt. VNQDĐ forces combined with disaffected Vietnamese troops, who mutinied against the French colonial army. The mutiny was quickly put down, with heavy French retribution. Học and other leading figures were captured and executed and the VNQDĐ never regained its political strength in the country.

Some remaining factions sought peaceful means of struggle, while other groups fled across the border to Kuomintang bases in the Yunnan province of China, where they received arms and training. Meanwhile, during the 1930s, the Ho Chi Minh's Indochinese Communist Party (ICP) began to gain followers, before being repressed following the failed 1940 Cochinchina Uprising. Vietnam was occupied by Japan during World War II and, in the chaos that followed the Japanese surrender in 1945, the VNQDĐ and the ICP briefly joined forces in the fight for Vietnamese independence. However, after a falling-out, Ho purged the VNQDĐ, leaving his communist-dominated Viet Minh unchallenged as the foremost anti-colonial militant organisation. As a part of the post-war settlement that ended the First Indochina War, Vietnam was partitioned into two zones. The remnants of the VNQDĐ fled to South Vietnam, where they remained until the Fall of Saigon in 1975 and the reunification of Vietnam under communist rule. Today, the party survives only among overseas Vietnamese.

== Origins ==
French involvement in Vietnam started in the late 18th century when the Catholic priest Pigneau de Behaine helped Nguyễn Ánh, to found the Nguyễn dynasty by recruiting French volunteers. In return, Nguyễn Ánh, better known by his era name Gia Long, allowed Catholic missionaries to operate in Vietnam. However, relations became strained under Gia Long's successor Minh Mạng as missionaries sought to incite revolts in an attempt to enthrone a Catholic. This prompted anti-Christian edicts, and in 1858 a French invasion of Vietnam was mounted-ostensibly to protect Catholicism, but in reality for colonial purposes. The French steadily made gains and completed the colonization of Vietnam in 1883. Armed revolts against colonial rule occurred regularly, most notably through the Cần Vương movement of the late-1880s. In the early-20th century, the 1916 southern revolts and the Thái Nguyên uprising were notable disruptions to the French administration.

In late 1925, a small group of young Hanoi-based intellectuals, led by a teacher named Phạm Tuấn Tài and his brother Phạm Tuấn Lâm, started the Nam Đồng thư xã (Southeast Asia Publishing House). They aimed to promote violent revolution as a means of gaining independence for Vietnam from French colonization, and published books and brochures about Sun Yat-sen and the 1911 Revolution, as well as opening a free school to teach chữ Quốc ngữ (Vietnamese alphabet) to the working class. The group soon attracted the support of other progressive young northerners, including students and teachers led by Nguyễn Thái Học. Hoc was an alumnus of Hanoi's Commercial School, who had been stripped of a scholarship because of his mediocre academic performance. Hoc had previously tried to initiate peaceful reforms by making written submissions to the French authorities, but these were ignored, and his attempt to foster policy change through the publication of a magazine never materialized due to the refusal of a license.

Harassment and censorship imposed by the French colonial authorities led to the commercial failure of the Nam Đồng thư xã. By the autumn of 1927, the group's priorities turned towards more direct political action, in a bid to appeal to more radical elements in the north. Membership grew to around 200, distributed among 18 cells in 14 provinces across northern and central Vietnam.

At the time, nationalist sentiment had been on the increase in Vietnam. The French colonial authorities were bringing more Vietnamese into the administration, and there was a small but growing proportion who were exposed to Western education. As a result, they became aware of French ideals such as Liberté, égalité, fraternité, republicanism and democracy, which sharply contrasted to the racial inequality and stratified system of the colonial elite ruling the masses in Vietnam. There was also an increasing awareness of the political writings of Montesquieu and Jean-Jacques Rousseau, which stoked a desire for civil and political rights, combined with the knowledge of the Japanese victory over Russia in 1905 which gave people confidence that Asians could defeat western powers.

== Formation ==
The army flag of the Vietnamese Nationalist Party, used in the 1930 uprising.

The Việt Nam Quốc Dân Đảng (VNQDĐ) was formed at a meeting in Hanoi on December 25, 1927, with Nguyen Thai Hoc as the party's first leader. It was Vietnam's first home-grown revolutionary party, established three years before the Indochinese Communist Party. The party advocated democratic socialism, but at the outset there was considerable debate over its other fundamental objectives. Many wanted it to promote worldwide revolution rather than limiting itself to campaigning for an independent Vietnamese republic, but there were fears that this would lead to accusations of communism and put off potential Vietnamese supporters who yearned above all for independence. In a bid for moderation, the final statement was a compromise that read:

The aim and general line of the party is to make a national revolution, to use military force to overthrow the feudal colonial system, to set up a democratic republic of Vietnam. At the same time we will help all oppressed nationalities in the work of struggling to achieve independence, in particular such neighboring countries as Laos and Cambodia.

A manifesto released in February 1930 showed that the VNQDĐ heavily based its rhetoric on appealing to resentment against the system of racial inequality and the French imposition of capitalism. It appealed to the populace to rise up against colonisation and the poor treatment of Vietnamese people. It assailed the French for restricting the Vietnamese people's ability to study, discuss policy and associate, and what it perceived as exploitative capitalist policies that enriched French enterprises while leaving Vietnamese people unhealthy. It criticised the colonial administration, which it saw as corrupt and encouraging low-level Vietnamese bureaucrats to mistreat their compatriots, and said that the ouster of French rule was necessary to stop the "elimination process" against the Vietnamese race.

In order to attain its primary aim of independence the VNQDĐ had three principles by which it intended to operate. The first was nationalism, under which people of all ethnic groups in Vietnam were to be citizens of a sovereign nation. Secondly, democracy; to give citizens the right to vote, impeach elected officials, ratify and abolish laws. The third and final principle was to implement socialist controls on the economy, and to restrict capitalism through nationalisation, guarantee minimum working conditions and enact land reform. This was ultimately aimed towards reducing income inequality. There had been a debate over the socioeconomic bent of the party when it was formed, with some advocating communism and others private property, but the position reached was not dissimilar from an existing Vietnamese social norm where villagers often owned land communally although social hierarchies still existed. Although the socioeconomic side of the VNQDĐ agenda was not as heavily promoted at a high political level as the other two principles, there was a strong push at grassroots level to implement more socialist systems.

Although the VNQDĐ modelled itself on Sun Yat-sen's Chinese Nationalist Party (the Kuomintang or KMT, later led by Chiang Kai-shek), even down to copying the "Nationalist Party" designation, it had no direct relationship with its Chinese counterpart and in fact did not gain much attention outside Vietnam until the Yen Bay mutiny in 1930. However, in elucidating its primary objective of national independence, it did rely ideologically on Sun's Three Principles of the People (nationalism, people's welfare and human rights). Like the KMT, it was a clandestine organisation held together with tight discipline. Its basic unit was the cell, above which there were several levels of administration, including provincial, regional and central committees. Also like the KMT, the VNQDĐ's revolutionary strategy envisaged a military takeover, followed by a period of political training for the population before a constitutional government could take control.

Most party members were teachers, young people who had been exposed to a western education and political theory, employees of the French colonial government, Confucian-oriented village notables, or non-commissioned officers in the colonial army. In particular, they sought to cultivate support among warrant officers who would then be able to mobilise their enlisted men. This led to a membership based heavily on traditional Asian and western-style political elites. The VNQDĐ campaigned mainly among these facets of society—there were few workers or peasants in its support base, and those that were supporters of the VNQDĐ, were put into affiliated organisations that were adjunct to the parent organisation. The party's popularity was based on a groundswell of anti-French feeling in northern Vietnam in the 1920s; many writers had assailed society for glorifying military actions against China, Champa, Siam and Cambodia, Vietnam's historical rivals, while neglecting to oppose French colonialism. The VNQDĐ admitted many female members, which was quite revolutionary for the time. It set about seeking alliances with other nationalist factions in Vietnam. In a meeting on July 4, 1928, the Central Committee appealed for unity among the Vietnamese revolutionary movements, sending delegates to meet with other organisations struggling for independence. The preliminary contacts did not yield any concrete alliances. Talks with the New Vietnam Revolutionary Party (NVRP) failed because the NVRP wanted a more centralised and structured party organisation, although the VNQDĐ did manage to absorb the NVRP branch in Hưng Hóa. The VNQDĐ also assailed the Vietnamese communists of Ho Chi Minh for betraying the leading nationalist of the time—Phan Bội Châu—to the French in return for a financial reward. Ho had done this to eliminate other nationalist rivals. The VNQDĐ would later be on the receiving end of another of Ho's manoeuvres.

== Initial activities ==
Financial problems compounded the VNQDĐ's difficulties. Money was needed to set up a commercial enterprise, a cover for the revolutionaries to meet and plot, and for raising funds. For this purpose, a hotel-restaurant named the Vietnam Hotel was opened in September 1928. The French colonial authorities were aware of the real purpose of the business, and put it under surveillance without taking further preliminary action. The first notable reorganisation of the VNQDĐ was in December, when Nguyen Khac Nhu replaced Hoc as chairman. Three proto-governmental organs were created, to form the legislative, executive and judicial arms of government. The records of the French secret service estimated that by early 1929, the VNQDĐ consisted of approximately 1,500 members in 120 cells, mostly in areas around the Red River Delta. The intelligence reported that most members were students, minor merchants or low-level bureaucrats in the French administration. The report stated that there were landlords and wealthy peasants among the members, but that few were of scholar-gentry (mandarin) rank. According to the historian Cecil B. Currey, "The VNQDĐ's lower-class origins made it, in many ways, closer to the labouring poor than were the Communists, many of whom…[were] from established middle-class families." At the time, the two other notable nationalist organisations were the communists and the New Vietnam Revolutionary Party, and although they had different visions of a post-independence nation, both competed with the VNQDĐ in attracting the support of the small, educated, urban class. In the late-1920s, around half of the communists were from bourgeoise backgrounds.

Beginning in 1928, the VNQDĐ attracted substantial Vietnamese support, provoking increased attention from the French colonial administration. This came after a VNQDĐ death squad killed several French officials and Vietnamese collaborators who had a reputation for cruelty towards the Vietnamese populace.

== Assassination of Bazin ==
The assassination of Hanoi-based French labour recruiter Hervé Bazin on February 9, 1929, was a turning point that marked the beginning of the VNQDĐ's decline. A graduate of the École Coloniale in Paris, Bazin directed the recruitment of Vietnamese labourers to work on colonial plantations. Recruiting techniques often included beating or coercion, because the foremen who did the recruiting received a commission for each enlisted worker. On the plantations, living conditions were poor and the remuneration was low, leading to widespread indignation. In response, Vietnamese hatred of Bazin led to thoughts of an assassination. A group of workers approached the VNQDĐ with a proposal to kill Bazin. The sources disagree on whether the party adopted a policy of sanctioning the assassination. One account is that Học felt that assassinations were pointless because they would only prompt a crackdown by the French Sûreté, thereby weakening the party. He felt that it was better to strengthen the party until the time was ripe to overthrow the French, viewing Bazin as a mere twig on the tree of the colonial apparatus. Another view is that the senior VNQDĐ leaders felt that killing Bazin was necessary so that the party would appear to be relevant to workers involved in industry or commerce, given that the communists had begun to target this demographic for their recruitment drives.

The first account says that, turned down by the VNQDĐ leadership, one of the assassination's proponents—it is unclear whether or not he was a party member—created his own plot. With an accomplice, he shot and killed Bazin on February 9, 1929, as the Frenchman left his mistress's house. The French attributed the attack to the VNQDĐ and reacted by apprehending all the party members they could find: between three and four hundred men were rounded up, including 36 government clerks, 13 French government officials, 36 schoolteachers, 39 merchants, 37 landowners and 40 military personnel. The subsequent trials resulted in 78 men being convicted and sentenced to jail terms ranging between five and twenty years. The arrests severely depleted the VNQDĐ leadership: most of the Central Committee were captured, though Học and Nhu were among the few who escaped from a raid on their hideout at the Vietnam Hotel.

== Internal split and change in strategy ==
In 1929, the VNQDĐ split when a faction led by Nguyễn Thế Nghiệp began to disobey party orders and was therefore expelled from the Central Committee. Some sources claim that Nghiệp had formed a breakaway party and had begun secret contacts with French authorities.

Perturbed by those who betrayed fellow members to the French and the problems this behaviour caused, Học convened a meeting to tighten regulations in mid-1929 at the village of Lạc Đạo, along the Gia Lâm-Haiphong railway. This was also the occasion for a shift in strategy: Hoc argued for a general uprising, citing rising discontent among Vietnamese soldiers in the colonial army. More moderate party leaders believed this move to be premature, and cautioned against it, but Hoc's stature meant he prevailed in shifting the party's orientation towards violent struggle. One of the arguments presented for large-scale violence was that the French response to the Bazin assassination meant that the party's strength could decline in the long term. The plan was to provoke a series of uprisings at military posts around the Red River Delta in early 1930, where VNQDĐ forces would join Vietnamese soldiers in an attack on the two major northern cities of Hanoi and Haiphong. The leaders agreed to restrict their uprisings to Tonkin, because the party was weak elsewhere.

For the remainder of 1929, the party prepared for the revolt. They located and manufactured weapons, storing them in hidden depots. The preparation was hindered by French police, particularly the seizure of arms caches. Recruitment campaigns and grassroots activist drives were put in place, even though the VNQDĐ were realistic and understood that their assault was unlikely to succeed. The village elders were used to mobilise neighbours into the political movement. Their logic was "Even if victory is not achieved, we will fully mature as human beings with our [heroic] efforts".

== Yên Bái mutiny ==
At around 01:30 on Monday, February 10, 1930, approximately 40 troops belonging to the 2nd Battalion of the Fourth Régiment de Tirailleurs Tonkinois stationed at Yên Bái, reinforced by around 60 civilian members of the VNQDĐ, attacked their 29 French officers and warrant officers. The rebels had intended to split into three groups: the first group was to infiltrate the infantry, kill French NCOs in their beds and raise support among Vietnamese troops; the second, supported by the VNQDĐ civilians, was to break into the post headquarters; and the third group would enter the officers' quarters. The French were caught off guard; five were killed and three seriously wounded. The mutineers isolated a few more French officers from their men, even managing to raise the VNQDĐ flag above one of the buildings. About two hours later, however, it became apparent that the badly coordinated uprising had failed, and the remaining 550 Vietnamese soldiers helped quell the rebellion rather than participate in it. The insurrectionists had failed to liquidate the Garde indigène town post and could not convince the frightened townspeople to join them in a general revolt. At 07:30, a French Indochinese counterattack scattered the mutineers; two hours later, order was re-established in Yên Bái.

That same evening, two further insurrectionary attempts failed in the Sơn Dương sector. A raid on the Garde indigène post in Hưng Hóa was repelled by the Vietnamese guards, who appeared to have been tipped off. In the nearby town of Kinh Khê, VNQDĐ members killed the instructor Nguyễn Quang Kính and one of his wives. After destroying the Garde indigène post in Lâm Thao, the VNQDĐ briefly seized control of the district seat. At sunrise, a new Garde indigène unit arrived and inflicted heavy losses on the insurgents, mortally wounding Nhu. Aware of the events in the upper delta region, Phó Đức Chính fled and abandoned a planned attack on the Sơn Tây garrison, but he was captured a few days later by French authorities.

On February 10, a VNQDĐ member injured a policeman at a Hanoi checkpoint; at night, Arts students threw bombs at government buildings, which they regarded as part of the repressive power of the colonial state. On the night of February 15–16, Học and his remaining forces seized the nearby villages of Phụ Dực and Vĩnh Bảo, in Thái Bình and Hải Dương provinces respectively, for a few hours. In the second village, the VNQDĐ killed the local mandarin of the French colonial government, Tri Huyen. On February 16, French warplanes responded by bombarding the VNQDĐ's last base at Cổ Am village; on the same day, Tonkin's Resident Superior René Robin dispatched 200 Gardes indigènes, eight French commanders and two Sûreté inspectors. A few further violent incidents occurred until February 22, when Governor-General Pierre Pasquier declared that the insurrection had been defeated. Học and his lieutenants, Chính and Nguyễn Thành Lợi, were apprehended.

A series of trials were held to prosecute those arrested during the uprising. The largest number of death penalties was handed down by the first Criminal Commission, which convened at Yen Bay. Among the 87 people found guilty at Yen Bay, 46 were servicemen. Some argued in their own defence that they had been "surprised and forced to take part in the insurrection". Of the 87 convicted, 39 were sentenced to death, five to deportation, 33 to life sentences of forced labour, nine to 20 years imprisonment, and one to five years of forced labour. Of those condemned to death, 24 were civilians and 15 were servicemen. Presidential pardons reduced the number of death penalties from 39 to 13. Học and Chính were among the 13 who were executed on June 17, 1930. The condemned men cried "Vietnam!" as the guillotine fell. Học wrote a final plea to the French, in a letter that claimed that he had always wanted to cooperate with French authorities, but that their intransigence had forced him to revolt. Học contended that France could only stay in Indochina if they dropped their "brutal" policies, and became more amiable towards the Vietnamese. The VNQDĐ leader called for universal education, training in commerce and industry, and an end to the corrupt practices of the French-installed mandarins.

== Exile in Yunnan ==
Following Yen Bay, the VNQDĐ became more diffuse, with many factions effectively acting virtually autonomously of one another. Lê Hữu Cảnh—who had tried to stall the failed mutiny—attempted to reunite what remained of the party under the banner of peaceful reform. Other factions, however, remained faithful to Học's legacy, recreating the movement in the Hanoi-Haiphong area. A failed assassination attempt on Governor-General Pasquier led to French crackdowns in 1931 and 1932. The survivors escaped to Yunnan in southern China, where some of Nghiệp's supporters were still active. The Yunnan VNQDĐ was in fact a section of the Chinese Kuomintang, who protected its members from the Chinese government while funds were raised by robbery and extortion along the Sino-Vietnamese border. This eventually led to a Chinese government crackdown, but VNQDĐ members continued to train at the Yunnan Military School; some enlisted in the nationalist Chinese army while others learned to manufacture weapons and munitions in the Yunnan arsenal.

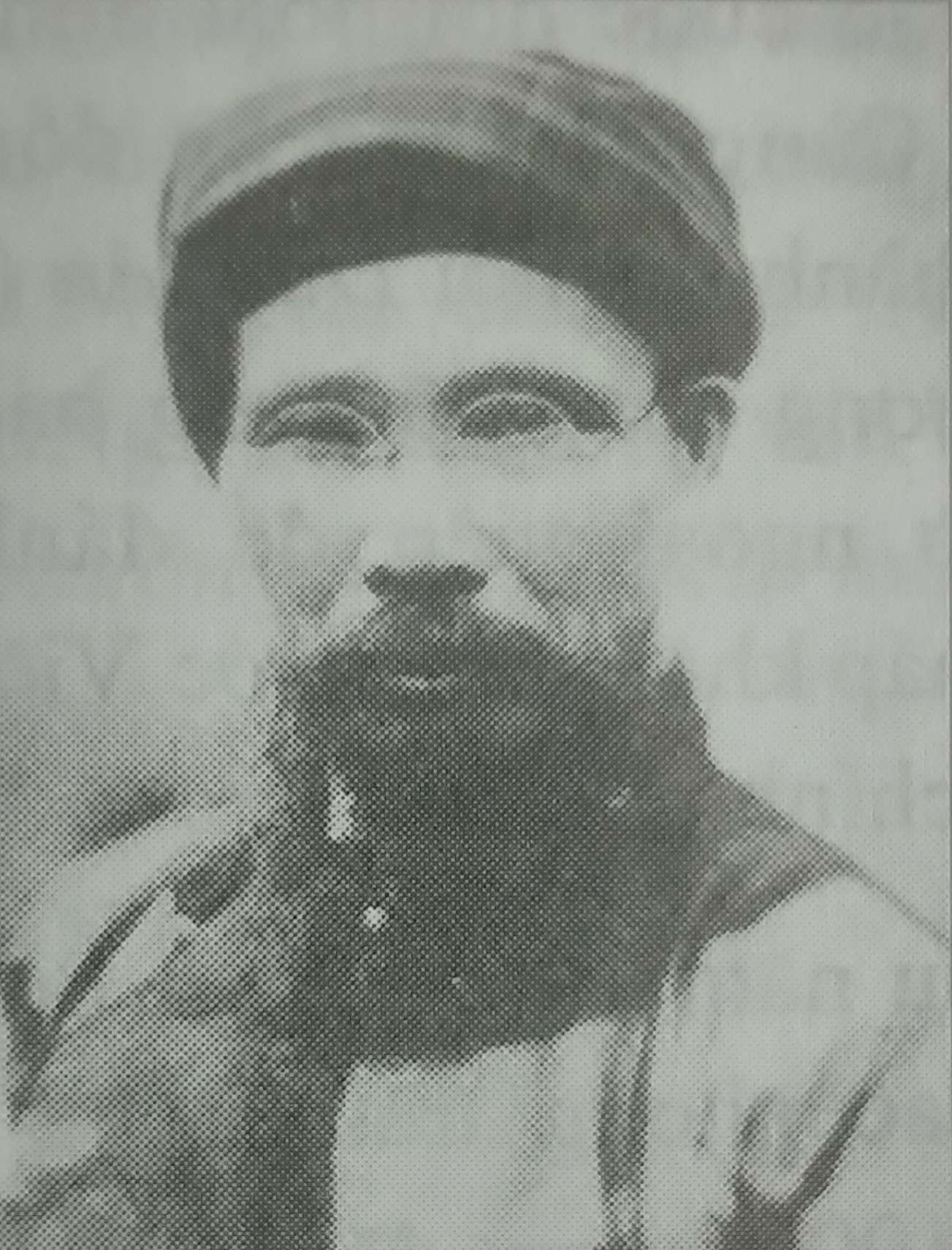
Following the Yên Bái mutiny, the VNQDĐ went into exile, merging with some followers of Phan Bội Châu (pictured).

Nghiệp was briefly jailed by Yunnan authorities, but continued to run the party from his cell. Upon his release in 1933, Nghiệp consolidated the party with similar groups in the area, including some followers of Phan Bội Châu who had formed a Canton-based organisation with similar aims in 1925. Châu's group had formed in opposition to the communist tendencies of Ho Chi Minh's Revolutionary Youth League. However, Ho betrayed Châu to eliminate a potential rival and to pocket a reward. With nationalist Chinese aid, Châu's followers had set up a League of Oppressed Oriental Peoples, a Pan-Asian group that ended in failure. In 1932 the League made the point of declaring a "Provisional Indochinese Government" at Canton. In July 1933, Châu's group was integrated into Nghiệp's Yunnan organisation. In 1935, Nghiệp surrendered to the French consulate in Shanghai. The remainder of the VNQDĐ was paralysed by infighting and began losing political relevance, with only moderate activity until the outbreak of World War II and Japan's invasion of French Indochina in 1940. They attempted to organise workers along the Yunnan railway, threatening occasional border assaults, with little success.

The VNQDĐ was gradually overshadowed as the leading Vietnamese independence organisation by Ho's Indochinese Communist Party (ICP). In 1940, Ho arrived in Yunnan, which was a hotbed of both ICP and VNQDĐ activity. He initiated collaboration between the ICP and other nationalists such as the VNQDĐ. At the time, World War II had broken out and Japan had conquered most of eastern China and replaced the French in Vietnam. Ho moved east to the neighbouring province of Guangxi, where Chinese military leaders had been attempting to organise Vietnamese nationalists against the Japanese. The VNQDĐ had been active in Guangxi and some of their members had joined the KMT army. Under the umbrella of KMT activities, a broad alliance of nationalists emerged. With Ho at the forefront, the Việt Nam Độc lập Đồng minh Hội (Vietnamese Independence League, usually known as the Viet Minh) was formed and based in the town of Chinghsi. The pro-VNQDĐ nationalist Hồ Ngọc Lâm, a KMT army officer and former disciple of Phan Bội Châu, was named as the deputy of Phạm Văn Đồng, later to be Ho's Prime Minister. The front was later broadened and renamed the Việt Nam giải phóng đồng minh (Vietnam Liberation League). It was an uneasy situation, as another VNQDĐ leader, Trương Bội Công, a graduate of a KMT military academy, wanted to challenge the communists for pre-eminence, while Vũ Hồng Khanh led a virulently anti-communist VNQDĐ faction. The Viet Nam Revolutionary League was a union of various Vietnamese nationalist groups, run by the pro Chinese VNQDĐ. Chinese KMT General Zhang Fakui created the league to further Chinese influence in Indochina, against the French and Japanese. Its stated goal was for unity with China under the Three Principles of the People, created by KMT founder Dr. Sun and opposition to Vietnamese and French Imperialists. The Revolutionary League was controlled by Nguyễn Hải Thần, who was born in China and could not speak Vietnamese. General Zhang shrewdly blocked the Communists of Vietnam, and Ho Chi Minh from entering the league, as his main goal was Chinese influence in Indochina. The KMT utilized these Vietnamese nationalists during World War II against Japanese forces. At one stage, the communists made an appeal for other Vietnamese anti-colonialists to join forces, but condemned Khanh as an "opportunist" and "fake revolutionary" in their letter. The cooperation in the border area lasted for only a few months before VNQDĐ officials complained to the local KMT officials that the communists, led by Đồng and Võ Nguyên Giáp, were attempting to dominate the league. This prompted the local authorities to shut down the front's activities.

== End of World War II ==
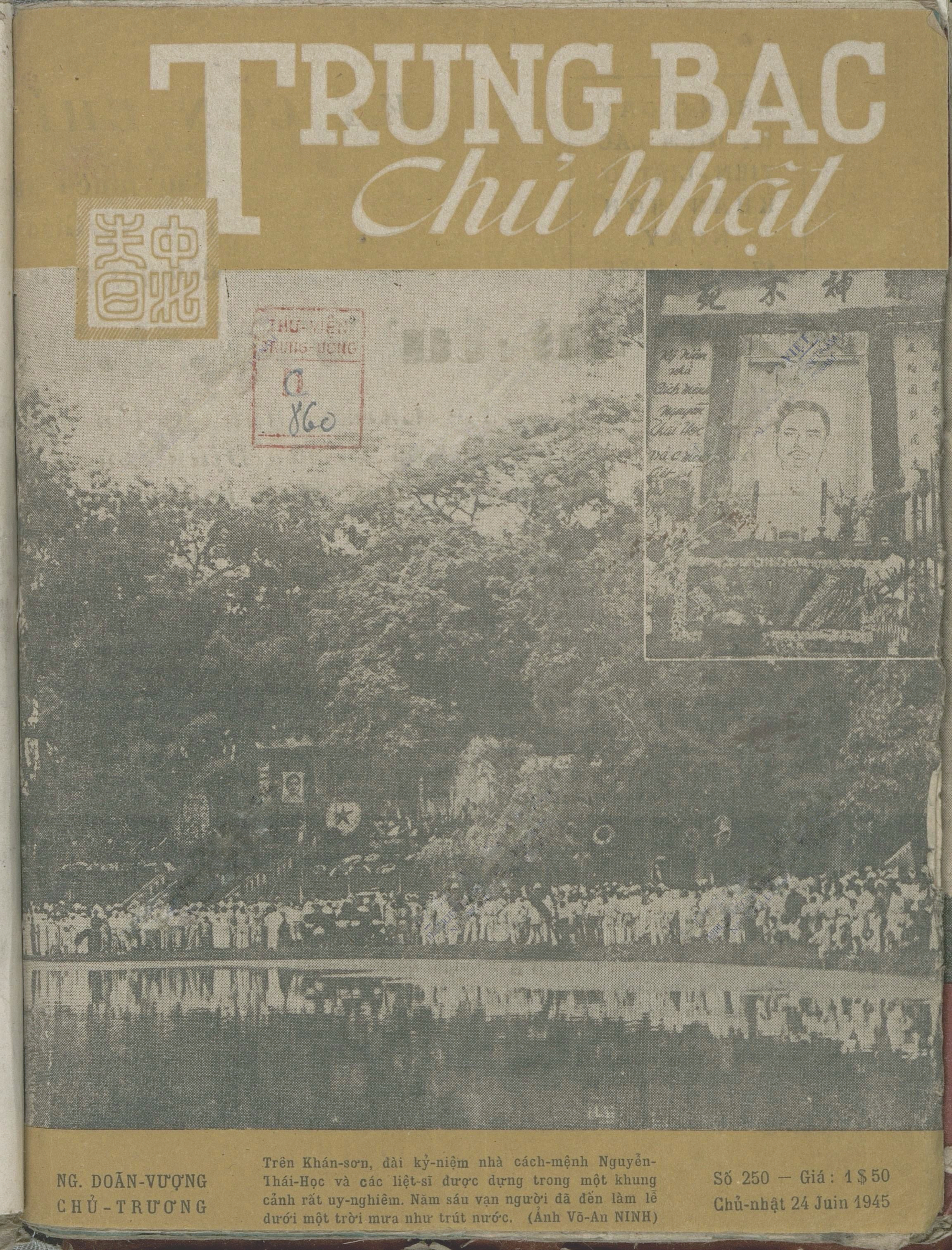
Public ceremony in commemoration of the Yên Bái mutiny, held in Hanoi, June 1945

In March 1945, the VNQDĐ received a boost, when Imperial Japan, which had occupied Vietnam since 1941, deposed the French administration, and installed the Empire of Vietnam, a Japanese-sponsored regime. This resulted in the release of some anti-French activists, including VNQDĐ members.

On August 15, 1945, Japanese forces in Vietnam surrendered. General Lu Han led Chinese Nationalist troops into Indochina north of the 16th parallel to accept the Japanese surrender. The government of the Republic of China favored the VNQDĐ over Viet Minh which led to Ho's reliance on the rebel Chinese communists.

Ho's Viet Minh seized power and set up a provisional government in the wake of Japan's withdrawal from Vietnam. This move violated a prior agreement between the member parties of the Vietnamese Revolutionary League (Việt Nam Cách mệnh Đồng minh Hội), which included the VNQDĐ as well as the Vietminh, and Ho was pressured to broaden his government's appeal by including the VNQDĐ (now led by Nguyễn Tường Tam). The Vietminh announced that they would abolish the mandarin governance system and hold national elections with universal suffrage in two hold. The VNQDĐ objected to this, fearing that the communists would perpetrate electoral fraud.

After the seizure of power, hundreds of VNQDĐ members returned from China, only to be killed at the border by the Vietminh. Nevertheless, the VNQDĐ arrived in northern Vietnam with arms and supplies from the KMT, in addition to its prestige as a Vietnamese nationalist organisation. Nationalist China backed the VNQDĐ in the hope of gaining more influence over its southern neighbour. Ho tried to broaden his support in order to strengthen himself, in addition to decreasing Chinese and French power. He hoped that by co-opting VNQDĐ members, he could shut out the KMT. The communists had no intention of sharing power with anyone in the long term and regarded the move as purely a strategic exercise. Giáp, the Vietminh's military chief, called the VNQDĐ a "group of reactionaries plotting to rely on Chiang Kai-Shek's Kuomintang and their rifle barrels to snatch a few crumbs". The VNQDĐ dominated the main control lines between northern Vietnam and China near Lào Cai. They funded their operations from the tribute that they levied from the local populace. Once the majority of the non-communist nationalists had returned to Vietnam, the VNQDĐ banded with them to form an anti-Vietminh alliance. The VNQDĐ and the Đại Việt Quốc dân Đảng (DVQDD, Nationalist Party of Greater Vietnam) started their own military academy at Yên Bái to train their own military recruits. Armed confrontations between the Vietminh and the nationalists occurred regularly in major northern cities. The VNQDĐ were aided by the KMT, who were in northern Vietnam as the result of an international agreement to stabilise the country. The KMT often disarmed local Vietminh bands.

The VNQDĐ then established their national headquarters in Hanoi, and began to publish newspapers, expounding their policies and explaining their ideology. The OSS agent Archimedes Patti, who was based in Kunming and northern Vietnam, reported that the VNQDĐ were "hopelessly disoriented politically" and felt that they had no idea of how to run a government. He speculated that the VNQDĐ were driven by "desires for personal power and economic gain". Giap accused them of being "bandits". Military and newspaper attacks between the groups occurred regularly, but a power-sharing agreement was put in place until the elections occurred in order to end the attacks and strengthen national unity to further the goal of independence. The communists also allowed the VNQDĐ to continue printing material.

However, the agreement was ineffective in the meantime. The VNQDĐ kidnapped Giáp and the Propaganda Minister Trần Huy Liệu and held them for three weeks until Ho agreed to remove Giáp and Liệu from the cabinet. As a result, the VNQDĐ's Vũ Hồng Khanh became defence minister, with Giáp as his deputy. What the VNQDĐ and other non-communist nationalists thought to be an equitable power-sharing agreement turned out to be a ruse. Every non-communist minister had a communist deputy, and if the former refused to approve a decree, the Vietminh official would do so. Many ministers were excluded from knowing the details of their portfolio; Khanh was forbidden to see any military statistics and some were forbidden to attend cabinet meetings. In one case, the Minister of Social Works became a factory worker because he was forced to remain politically idle. Meanwhile, Giáp was able to stymie the activities of VNQDĐ officials of higher rank in the coalition government. Aside from shutting down the ability of the VNQDĐ officials to disseminate information, he often ordered his men to start riots and street brawls at public VNQDĐ events.

Ho scheduled elections for December 23, but he made a deal with the VNQDĐ and the Đồng Minh Hội, which assured them of 50 and 20 seats in the new national assembly respectively, regardless of the poll results. This only temporarily placated the VNQDĐ, which continued its skirmishes against the Vietminh. Eventually, Chinese pressure on the VNQDĐ and the Đồng Minh Hội saw them accept a coalition government, in which Tam served as foreign minister. For the communists' part, they accused the KMT of intimidating them into sharing power with the VNQDĐ, and claimed that VNQDĐ soldiers had tried to attack polling stations. The VNQDĐ claimed that the communists had engaged in vote fraud and intimidation, citing Vietminh claims that they had received tallies in excess of 80% in areas controlled by French troops.

== Colonial and civil war ==
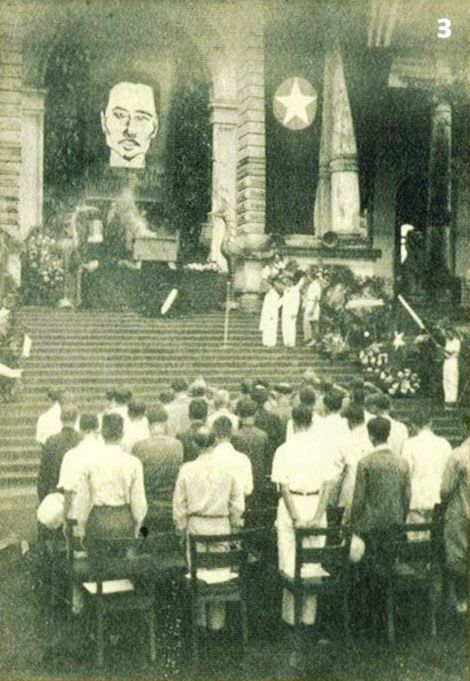
Ceremony in tribute to Nguyễn Thái Học, Hanoi, June 1946

The Ho–Sainteny Agreement, signed on March 6, 1946, saw the return of French colonial forces to North Vietnam, replacing the Chinese nationalists who were supposed to be maintaining order. The VNQDĐ were now without their main supporters. As a result, the VNQDĐ were further attacked by the French, who often encircled VNQDĐ strongholds, enabling Viet Minh attacks. Giáp's army hunted down VNQDĐ troops and cleared them from the Red River Delta, seizing arms and arresting party members, who were falsely charged with crimes ranging from counterfeiting to unlawful arms possession. The Viet Minh massacred thousands of VNQDĐ members and other nationalists in a large scale purge. Most of the survivors fled to southern China or non-Vietminh areas in Vietnam. After driving the VNQDĐ out of their Hanoi headquarters on Ôn Như Hầu Street, Giáp ordered his agents to construct an underground torture chamber on the premises. They then planted exhumed and badly decomposed bodies in the chamber, and accused the VNQDĐ of gruesome murders, although most of the dead were VNQDĐ members who had been killed by Giáp's men. The communists made a public spectacle of the scene in an attempt to discredit the VNQDĐ, but the truth eventually came out and the "Ôn Như Hầu street affair" lowered their public image.

When the National Assembly reconvened in Hanoi on October 28, only 30 of the 50 VNQDĐ seats were filled. Of the 37 VNQDĐ and Đồng Minh Hội members who turned up, only 20 remained by the end of the session. By the end of the year, Tam had resigned as foreign minister and fled to China, and only one of the three original VNQDĐ cabinet members was still in office. In any case, the VNQDĐ never had any power, despite their numerical presence. Upon the opening of the National Assembly, the communist majority voted to vest power in an executive committee almost entirely consisting of communists; the legislature met only once a year. In any case, the façade of a legislature was dispensed with as the First Indochina War went into full flight. A small group of VNQDĐ fighters escaped Giáp's assault and retreated to a mountainous enclave along the Sino-Vietnamese border, where they declared themselves to be the government of Vietnam, with little effect.

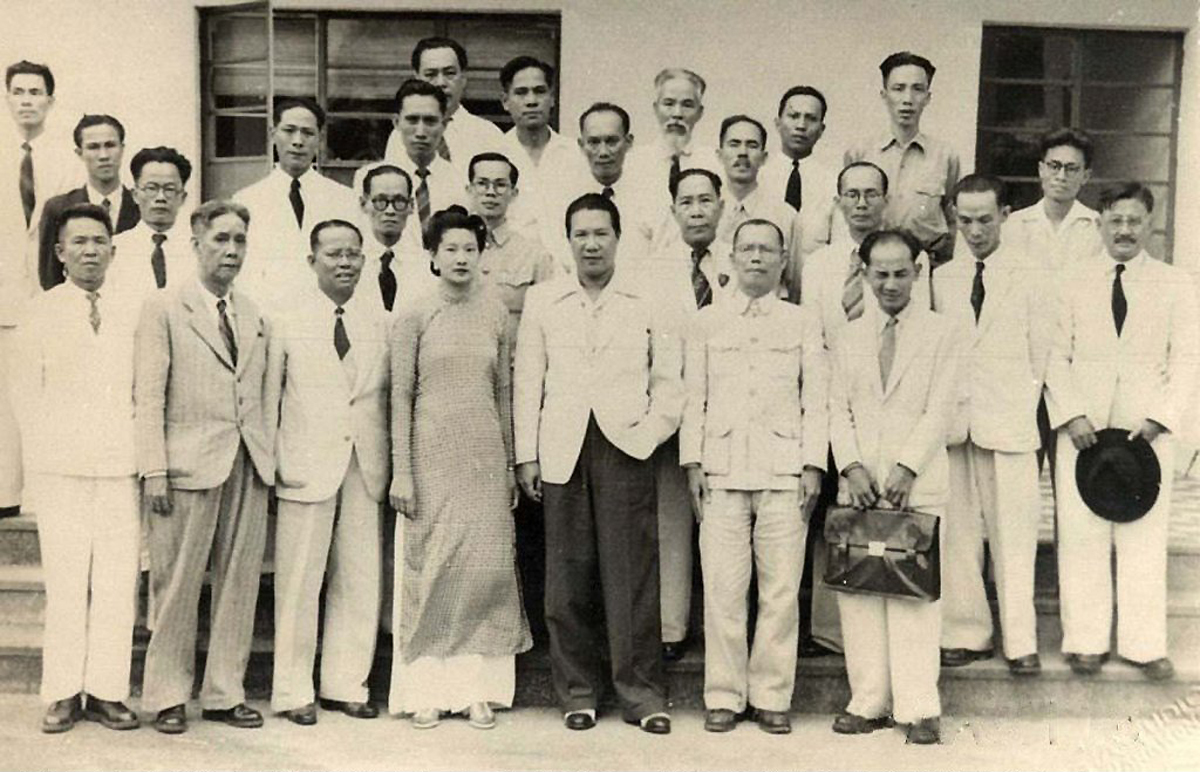
Bảo Đại with nationalist revolutionaries in Hong Kong, September 1947

Since February 1947, several party members had rallied around Bảo Đại to reopen negotiations with France to fight communism while building democracy and gradually gaining independence for Vietnam within the French Union, leading to the establishment of the State of Vietnam. Vũ Hồng Khanh initially opposed compromise with the French, but as Chinese communist forces approached total victory on the mainland in December 1949, he led a force composed of Vietnamese, upland minorities, and Kuomintang soldiers from China toward Lạng Sơn in an attempt to attack both the Viet Minh and the French. After being defeated by both sides, he eventually joined the State of Vietnam. Nguyễn Tường Bách, the youngest brother of Nhất Linh and Hoàng Đạo, intended to stay temporarily in Foshan but ultimately remained there for 40 years before moving to the United States.

== Relocation South Vietnam ==
After Vietnam gained independence in 1954, the Geneva Accords partitioned the country into a communist north and an anti-communist south, but stipulated that there were to be 300 days of free passage between the two zones. During Operation Passage to Freedom, most VNQDĐ members migrated to the south.

The VNQDĐ was deeply divided after years of communist pressure, lacked strong leadership and no longer had a coherent military presence, although they had a large presence in central Vietnam. The party's disarray was only exacerbated by the actions of autocratic President Ngô Đình Diệm, who imprisoned many of its members. Diệm's administration was a "dictatorship by Catholics—A new kind of fascism", according to the title of a VNQDĐ pamphlet published in July 1955. The VNQDĐ tried to revolt against Diệm in 1955 in central Vietnam. During the transition period after Geneva, the VNQDĐ sought to set up a new military academy in central Vietnam, but they were crushed by Ngô Đình Cẩn, who ran the region for his elder brother Diệm, dismantled and jailed VNQDĐ members and leaders.

Many officers in the Army of the Republic of Vietnam (ARVN) felt that Diệm discriminated against them because of their political leanings. Diệm used the Cần Lao Party to keep control of the army and stifle attempts by VNQDĐ members to rise through the ranks.

During the Diệm era, the VNQDĐ were implicated in two failed coup attempts. In November 1960, a paratrooper revolt failed after the mutineers agreed to negotiate, allowing time for loyalists to relieve the president. Many of the officers involved had links to or were members of the VNQDĐ, and fled the country after the coup collapsed. In 1963, VNQDĐ leaders Tâm and Vũ Hồng Khanh were among those arrested for their involvement in the plot; Tâm committed suicide before the case started, and Khanh was jailed. In February 1962, two Republic of Vietnam Air Force pilots, Nguyễn Văn Cử—son of a prominent VNQDĐ leader—and Phạm Phú Quốc, bombed the Independence Palace in a bid to kill Diệm and his family, but their targets escaped unharmed. Diệm was eventually deposed in a military coup and killed in November 1963. While the generals that led the coup were not members of the VNQDĐ, they sought to cultivate ARVN officers who were part of the VNQDĐ because of their antipathy towards Diệm.

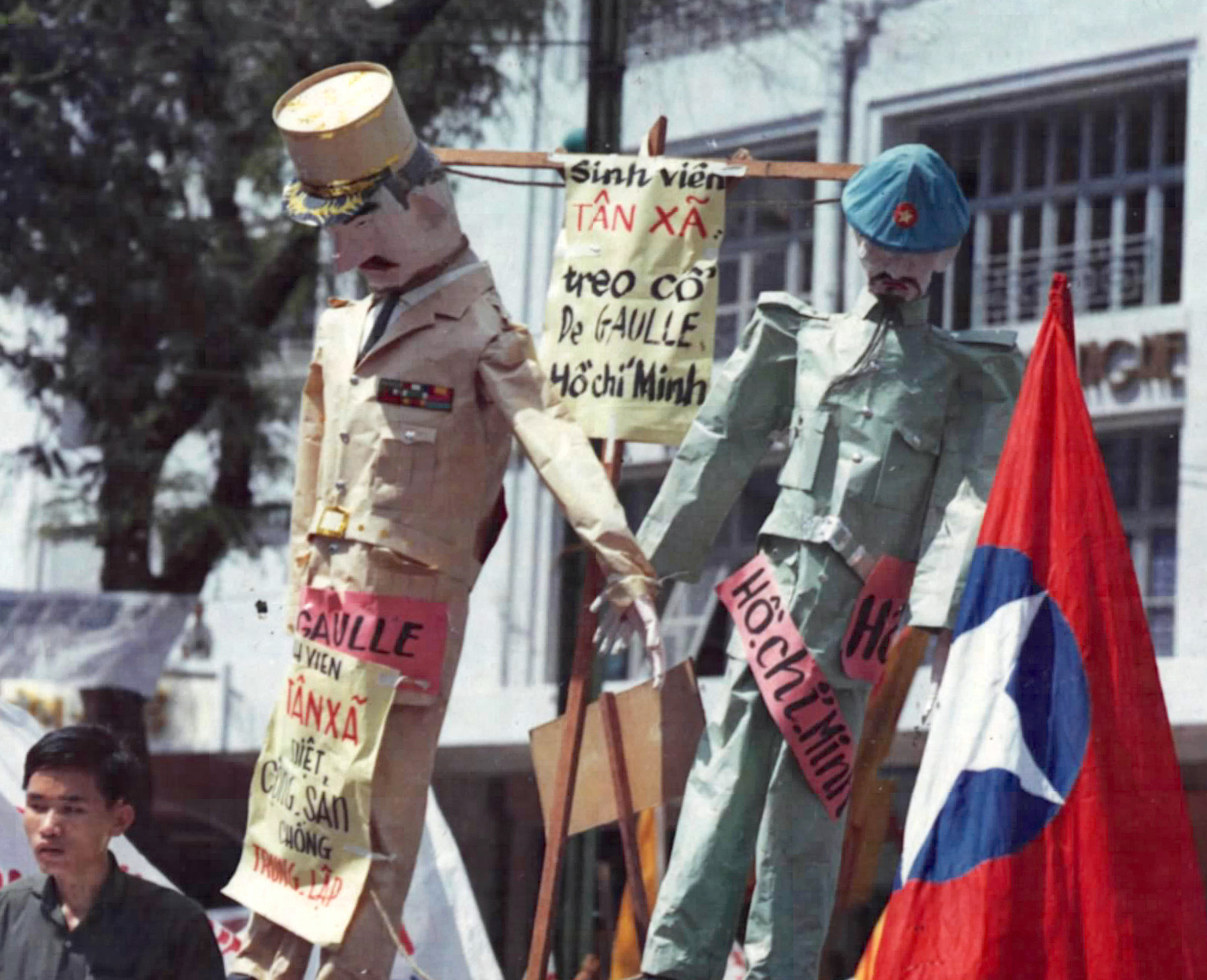
Commemorating 10 years of the partition of Vietnam, condemning both the French and Ho Chi Minh

Many VNQDĐ members were part of the ARVN, which sought to prevent South Vietnam from being overrun by communists during the Vietnam War, and they were known for being more anti-communist than most of their compatriots.

After the fall of Diệm and the execution of Cẩn in May 1964, the VNQDĐ became more active in their strongholds in central Vietnam. Nevertheless, there was no coherent national leadership and groups at district and provincial level tended to operate autonomously. By 1965, their members had managed to infiltrate and take over the Peoples Action Teams (PATs), irregular paramilitary counter-insurgency forces organised by Australian Army advisers to fight the communists, and used them for their own purposes. In December, one VNQDĐ member had managed to turn his PAT colleagues towards the nationalist agenda, and the local party leadership in Quảng Nam approached the Australians in an attempt to have the 1000-man PAT outfit formally allied to the VNQDĐ. The overture was rejected. The politicisation of paramilitary units worked both ways; some province chiefs used the anti-communist forces to assassinate political opponents, including VNQDĐ members.

In 1966, the Buddhist Uprising erupted in central Vietnam, in which some Buddhist leaders fomented civil unrest against the war, hoping to end foreign involvement in Vietnam and end the conflict through a peace deal with the communists. The VNQDĐ remained implacably opposed to any coexistence with the communists. Members of the VNQDĐ made alliances with Catholics, collected arms, and engaged in pro-war street clashes with the Buddhists, forcing elements of the ARVN to intervene to stop them.

On April 19, clashes erupted in Quảng Ngãi Province between the Buddhists and the VNQDĐ, prompting the local ARVN commander Tôn Thất Đính to forcibly restrain the two groups. Three days later the VNQDĐ accused the Buddhists of attacking their premises in Hội An and Da Nang, while US officials reported that the VNQDĐ were making plans to assassinate leading Buddhists, such as the activist monk Thích Trí Quang.

The VNQDĐ contested the national elections of 1967, the first elections since the fall of Diem, which were rigged—Diệm and his people invariably gained more than 95% of the vote and sometimes exceeded the number of registered voters. The campaign was disorganised due to a lack of infrastructure and some VNQDĐ candidates were not formally sanctioned by any hierarchy. The VNQDĐ focused on the districts in I Corps in central Vietnam where they were thought to be strong. There were 60 seats in the senate, and the six victorious tickets would see all ten of their members elected. The VNQDĐ entered eight tickets in the senate election, and while they totalled 15% of the national vote between them, the most of any grouping, it was diluted between the groupings; none of the tickets and thus none of the candidates were elected. This contrasted with one Catholic alliance with three tickets that won only 8% of the vote, but had all 30 candidates elected. They won nine seats in the lower house, a small minority presence, all from districts in central Vietnam, where they tended to poll between 20 and 40% in various areas. The VNQDĐ members made several loose alliances with Hòa Hảo members of the lower house.

During the Tet Offensive of 1968, the communists attacked and seized control of Huế for a month. During this time, in the Massacre at Huế they executed around 3,000–6,000 people that they had taken prisoner, out of a total population of 140,000. The communists had compiled a list of "reactionaries" to be liquidated before their assault. Known for their virulent anti-communism, VNQDĐ members appeared to have been disproportionately targeted in the massacre.

After the Fall of Saigon and the end of the Vietnam War, the remnants of the VNQDĐ were again targeted by the victorious communists. As Vietnam is a single-party state led by the Vietnamese Communist Party, the VNQDĐ is illegal. Some VNQDĐ members fled to the West, where they continued their political activities. The VNQDĐ remains respected among some sections of the overseas Vietnamese community as Vietnam's leading anti-communist organisation.
