= Nguyễn Thái Học Street =

Street in Hanoi, Vietnam

Coordinates: 21.0305°N 105.8357°E

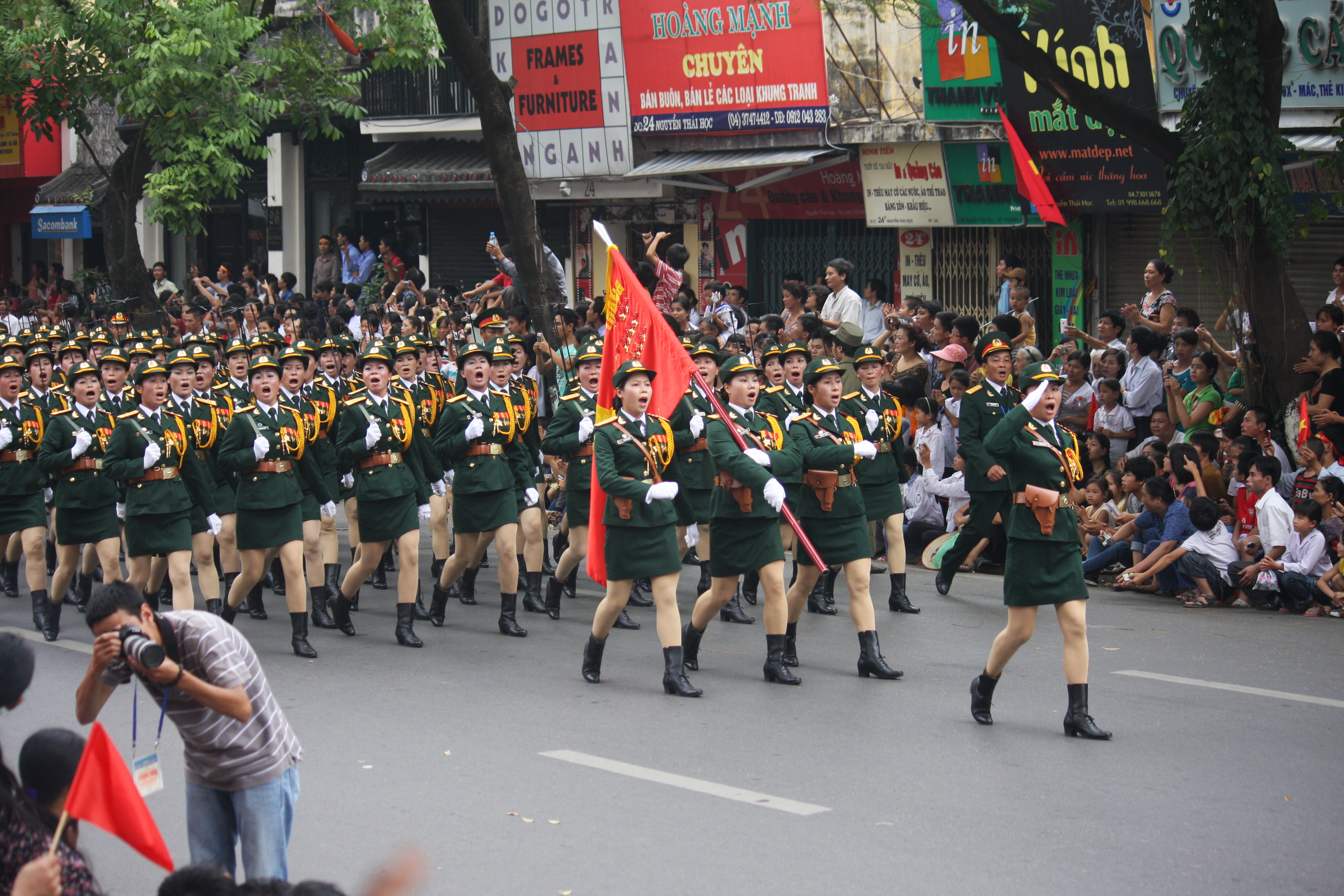
Female troops parading on the street during the Millennial Anniversary of Hanoi

Nguyễn Thái Học Street (phố Nguyễn Thái Học) is a major street in Văn Miếu - Quốc Tử Giám Ward, Hanoi.

== History ==
The old name of the street was Duvillier Street, but became known as phố Hàng Đẫy. Under the French this became Rue Duvillier in 1908, named after a French official. This became the phố Hàng Đẫy, then phố Phan Chu Trinh in 1945, then finally the street was given the revolutionary name phố Nguyễn Thái Học in 1950.

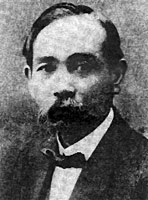
Phan Châu Trinh

== Notable buildings ==
The street contains many merchant houses.

- No. 65 (Số nhà 65 Nguyễn Thái Học) was an artists colony, in which a dozen artists worked, lived and held a gallery.
- No. 66 Nguyễn Thái Học, is the Vietnam Fine Arts Museum. The building, built in 1937, was an abandoned Catholic girl's boarding house.
- Temple of Literature, Hanoi (Văn Miếu-Quốc Tử Giám)
