= Nguyễn Khắc Nhu =

Patriotic scholar and member of the Vietnamese Nationalist Party

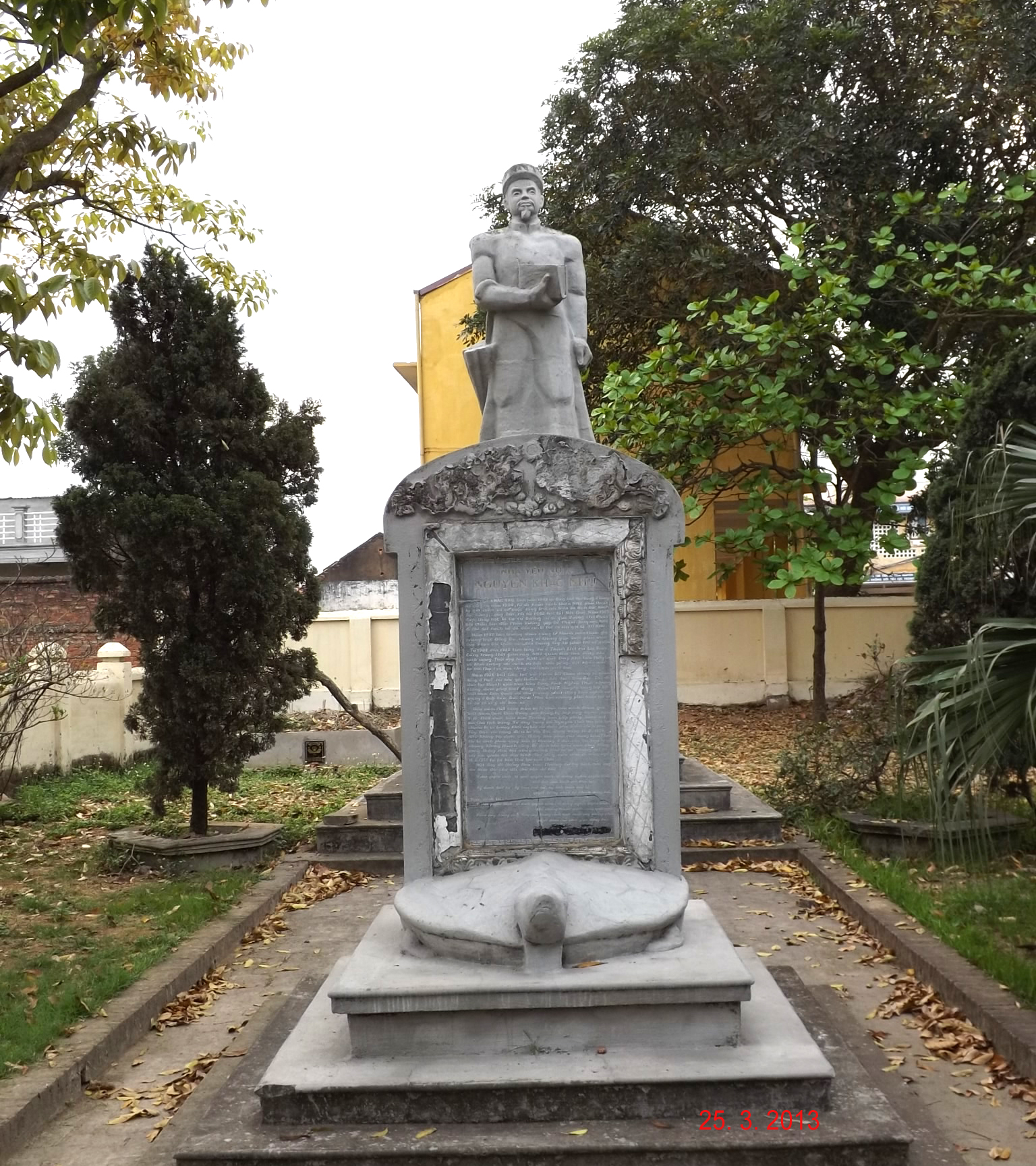
Grave of Nguyễn Khắc Nhu.

Nguyễn Khắc Nhu (1882–1930) was a patriotic scholar and member of the Vietnamese Nationalist Party.

== Background ==
He was born in 1882, in Song Khe village, Yen Dung district (now Song Khe commune, Bac Giang province), Bac Giang province.

== Revolutionary career ==
In 1903, he led Phan Boi Chau to see Hoàng Hoa Thám. After many times have failed to pass the national examination, he returned to his hometown to teach and join the Dong Du Movement, founded Hội Quốc Dân dục tài, made some changes in his hometown. However, it was forbidden by Colonial authorities

== Legacy ==
On February 8, 1961 he was awarded by the Prime Minister Pham Van Dong for his contribution to the country.

Streets are named after him in Hanoi, Ho Chi Minh City, Bac Giang, Da Nang, An Giang, Yen Bai and some other cities in Vietnam.

A memorial monument to him was built in Song Khe hamlet, Song Khe commune, Bac Giang city.
