= Nguyen Giac Ngo =

Vietnamese military and religious leader (1897–1967)

- Nguyễn Giác Ngộ
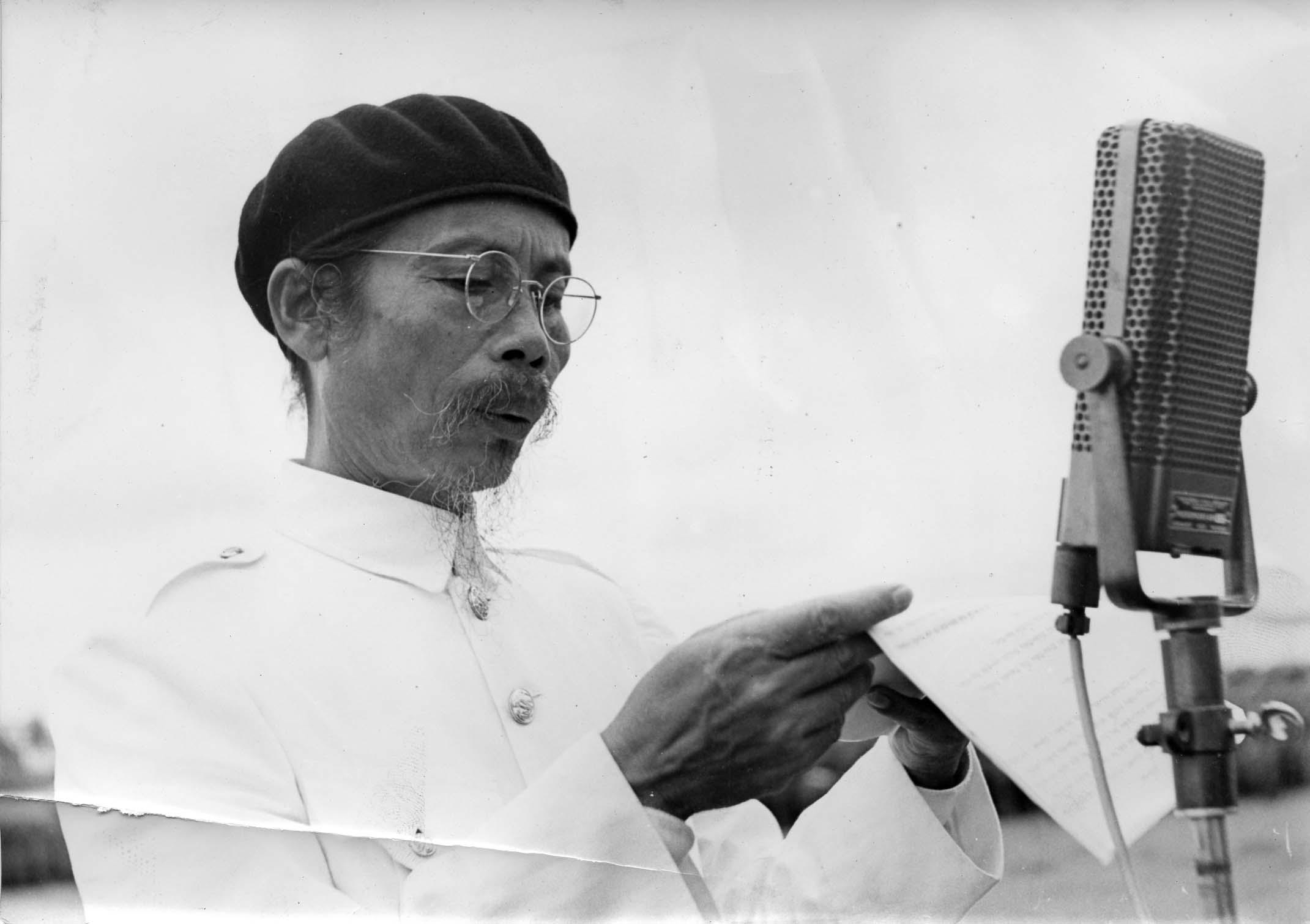
- Born: 18 May 1897; Chợ Mới, French Indochina
- Died: February 2, 1967 (aged 69); Chợ Mới, South Vietnam
- Military career
- Allegiance: Hòa Hảo/ South Vietnam
- Service years: 1940–1955
- Rank: Major General
- Nickname: Nguyễn Văn Ngượt
- Commands: Hòa Hảo armed forces
- Conflicts: World War II; First Indochina War; Vietnam War

Nguyen Giac Ngo (Vietnamese: Nguyễn Giác Ngộ; lit. 'Nguyen the Enlightened'), real name Nguyen Van Nguot (Vietnamese: Nguyễn Văn Ngượt; 1897–1967), was a Vietnamese military leader, serving as the major general of the Republic of Vietnam Military Forces, and a senior officer of the armed forces of the Hòa Hảo, and one of their religious leaders. Receiving French military training, he stood in the ranks of the Hòa Hảo forces for over a decade. In 1950, he turned to cooperating with the Vietnamese National Army.

== Life ==
=== Early years ===
He was born on 18 May 1897 as Nguyễn Văn Ngượt in the Chợ Mới district of Long Xuyên, French Cochinchina, in a family of a middle-sized landowners. He worked as a warrant officer in the Long Xuyên municipal police. After meeting Huỳnh Phú Sổ, the founder of the Hòa Hảo sect, in 1940, he changed his name to Nguyễn Giác Ngộ. He became an ardent and devout preacher for the sect, particularly among law enforcement, where he remained until 1945.

Some Hòa Hảo adepts left their fields in early 1943 and rushed to Thạnh Mỹ Tây to "seek sanctuary." The adepts restored the temple of Linh Lang under the direction of Giác Ngộ, which had been ordered demolished in 1913. However, the presence of tens of thousands of sectarians in Thạnh Mỹ Tây sparked further turmoil. The French ordered the temple's restoration to be halted, and Nguyen Giác Ngộ and other prominent sectaries were taken to Bà Rá camp or Côn Sơn Island. Giác Ngộ returned to the Mekong Delta after being released in 1945 and immediately began forming new armed units.

=== First Indochina War ===
While war was raging in the north, the sect renewed its anti-French and anti-Việt Minh operations in December 1946. They renamed themselves The Thirtieth Nguyen Trung True Division during the reorganization of the Hòa Hảo military forces, and Giác Ngộ was appointed the general-in-chief.

After the death of Sổ in April 1947, the sect began to lose momentum, leading to factionalism, parochialism, and outside organization influence, which caused an increase in violence as the various internal factions engaged in conflicts among themselves. By 1948, Giác Ngộ had left the military to devote his entire life to religious self-improvement, though he returned to military leadership after being appealed by the Vietnamese Democratic Socialist Party, as the other Hòa Hảo generals Trần Văn Soái (1889–1961), Lâm Thành Nguyên (1904–1977), and Ba Cụt were fighting with each other. This frustrated Thành Nguyên and provoked his reconciliation with Soái. Meanwhile, Giác Ngộ was attempting to oust Ba Cụt from the Chợ Mới district. He surrendered immediately to the French colonial authorities after he had accomplished this. Soái was drawn into Chợ Mới by this slight. It took the French until 1950 to persuade him to leave the district under Giác Ngộ's control.

=== Sect crisis ===
During the sect crisis of 1955, 200 people led by Giác Ngộ and Cao Đài leaders gathered in the Saigon City Hall to declare the General Assembly of the Democratic and Revolutionary Forces of the Nation. Its members tore down a large photograph of the Emperor Bảo Đại, hurled it out the window, and stomped on it in the street before the meeting started, and proceeded to condemn the French and their allies. The assembly then drafted a list of demands that included Bảo Đại's abdication, the removal of all French forces, and the formation of a new government headed by President Ngô Đình Diệm (1901–1963). They formed a committee to deliver the demands to the government, but when they arrived at the palace, they discovered General Nguyễn Văn Vỹ (1916–1981) sitting in Diệm's office, declaring that he was taking over the army as Bảo Đại had instructed. Vỹ was taken hostage and compelled to cancel his plans by several members of the committee. After a paratroop colonel threatened Diệm, he let Vỹ go, and Vỹ left the next day for Paris.

== Sources ==
- Tai, Hue-Tam Ho (2013). Millenarianism and Peasant Politics in Vietnam. Harvard University Press. ISBN 978-0674433694.
- Bourdeaux, Pascal (2018). "Phật Giáo Hòa Hảo". In Pokorny, Lukas; Winter, Franz (eds.). Handbook of East Asian New Religious Movements. Brill Handbooks on Contemporary Religion. Brill Publishers. pp. 584–601. ISBN 978-9004362055.
- Kiernan, Ben (2017). Viet Nam: A History from Earliest Times to the Present. Oxford University Press. ISBN 9780195160765.
- Marr, David G. (1 April 1984). "Hue-Tam Ho Tai. Milllnarianism and Peasant Politics in Vietnam. (Harvard East Asian Series, number 99.) Cambridge: Harvard University Press. 1983. Pp. xii, 220. $30.00". The American Historical Review. 89 (2): 508–509. doi:10.1086/ahr/89.2.508-a.
- Elliott, David W. P. (2003). The Vietnamese War: Revolution and Social Change in the Mekong Delta, 1930–1975. Armonk, New York: M. E. Sharpe. ISBN 0-7656-0602-X.
- Moyar, Mark (2009). Triumph Forsaken: The Vietnam War, 1954–1965. Cambridge University Press. ISBN 978-0521757638.
- Thống, Trần Ngọc; Huân, Hồ Đắc; Thụy, Lê Đình (2011). Lược sử Quân lực Việt Nam Cộng hòa (in Vietnamese).
