= Đạo Bửu Sơn Kỳ Hương =

Vietnamese religion

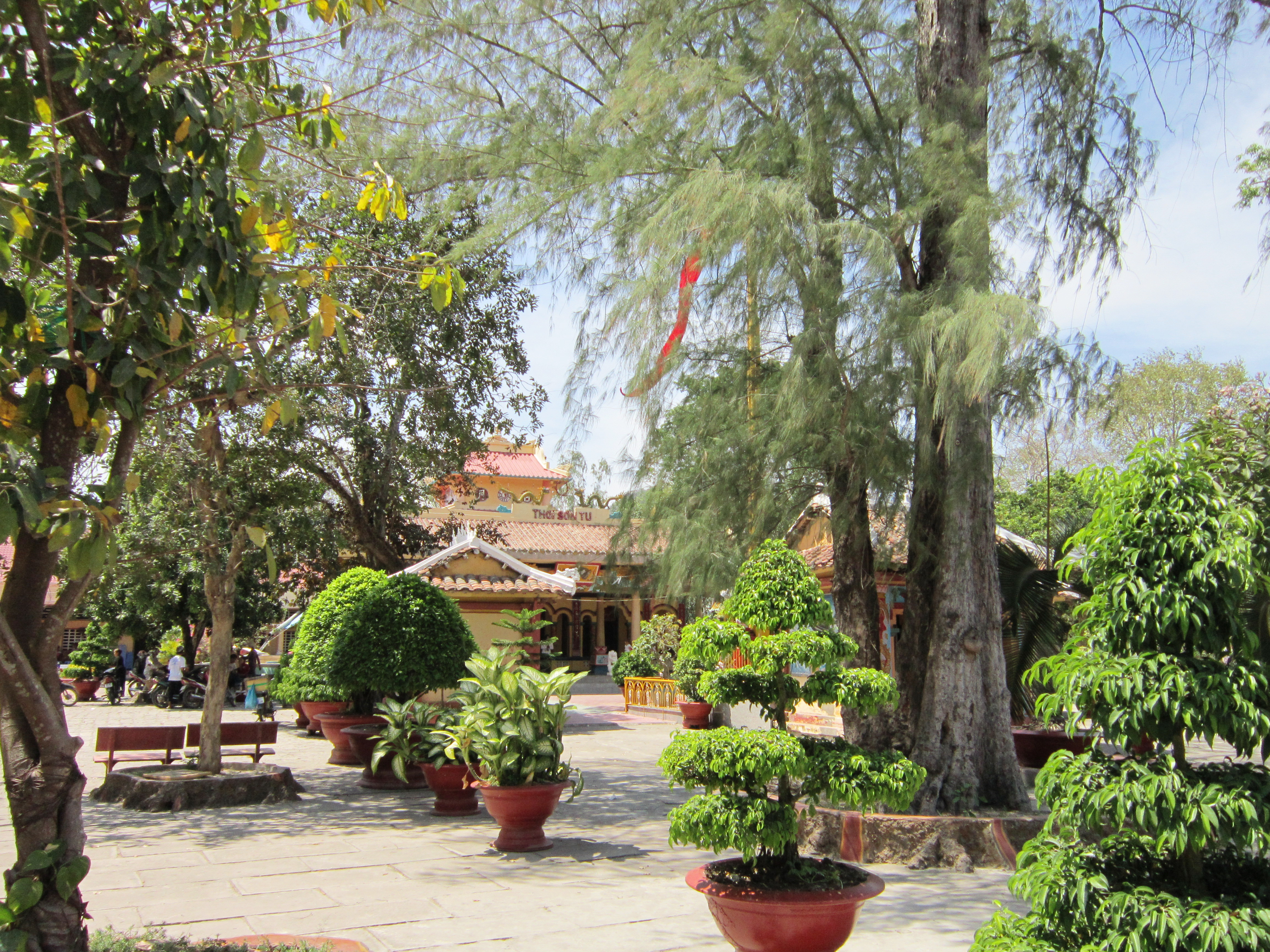
Thới Sơn Tự, a temple of Bửu Sơn Kỳ Hương

Đạo Bửu Sơn Kỳ Hương (道寶山奇香, Vietnamese: [ɗâːwˀ ɓɨ᷉w ʂəːn kî hɨəŋ], "Way of the Strange Fragrance from the Precious Mountain") refers to a religious tradition originally practiced by the mystic Đoàn Minh Huyên (1807–1856) and continued by Huỳnh Phú Sổ, founder of the Hòa Hảo sect. The phrase itself refers to the Thất Sơn range on the Vietnamese-Cambodian border, where Huyên, claiming to be a living Buddha sent into the world to rescue humankind, and accepted as such by followers of Hòa Hảo, is said to have made his first appearance in 1849.

== History ==
Đoàn Minh Huyên, a native of Sa Đéc (now Đồng Tháp) province in the Mekong Delta region of Vietnam, came to be known as the "Buddha Master of Western Peace" (Phật Thầy Tây An) during the cholera epidemic in 1849, which killed over a million people. Huyên was reputed to have supernatural abilities to cure the sick and the insane. His followers wore amulets bearing the Chinese characters for Bửu Sơn Kỳ Hương, a phrase that became identified, retrospectively, with the religion practiced by Huyên, and the millenarian movement associated with the latter.

Huyên, along with Huỳnh Phú Sổ, are regarded by Hòa Hảo followers as living Buddha destined to save mankind from suffering and to protect the Vietnamese nation. Historian Hue-Tam Ho Tai suggests that the phrase Bửu Sơn Kỳ Hương may have been coined by writers belonging to Hòa Hảo.
