= Chợ Mới =

Chợ Mới may refer to several places in Vietnam, including:

- Chợ Mới, An Giang, a commune in An Giang province
- Chợ Mới, Thái Nguyên, a commune in Thái Nguyên province
- Chợ Mới district, An Giang, a former district in An Giang province
- Chợ Mới district, Bắc Kạn, a former district in Bắc Kạn province
