= Trần Văn Soái =

Vietnamese military leader

Tran Van Soai
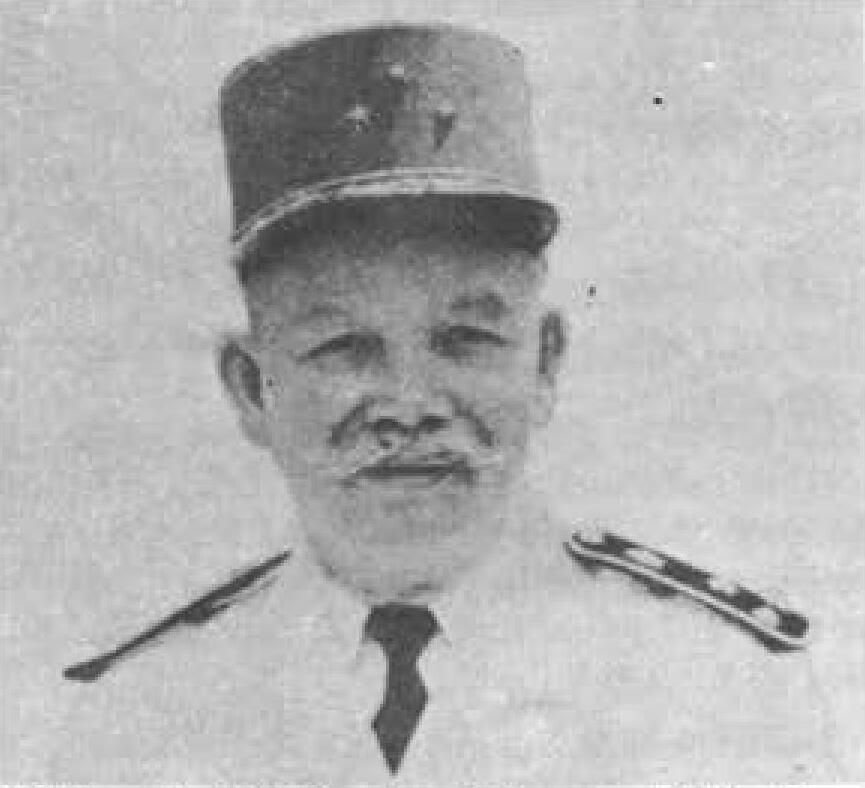
- Native name: Trần Văn Soái
- Nickname: Năm Lửa
- Born: 1889; Long Xuyên, French Indochina
- Died: February 9, 1961 (aged 71–72) Saigon, South Vietnam
- Allegiance: Hòa Hảo
- Service years: 1940–1956
- Rank: Lieutenant General
- Commands: Hòa Hảo armed forces
- Conflicts: World War II; Civil conflicts in Vietnam (1945-1949); First Indochina War; Vietnam War

Trần Văn Soái (1889–1961), also known as Năm Lửa (lit. 'Five Fires'), was a Vietnamese general and warlord, he served as commander-in-chief of the armed forces of the Hòa Hảo.

Born in Southern Vietnam into peasantry, he initially worked as a bus driver and became a gang leader. He converted to Hòa Hảo during World War II, and then quickly rose to prominence as the sect's leading military leader. He fought against the Japanese and Viet Minh during World War II and the First Indochina War. His forces then struggled against the South Vietnamese leader Ngô Đình Diệm in the 1950s, during the Vietnam War.

== Life ==
=== Early years ===
Trần Văn Soái was born in Long Xuyên in 1889. He then settled in Cái Vồn of Cần Thơ, a province in Southern Vietnam. He began his career as an uneducated peasant, working as a mechanic on ships that sailed the Bassac River, then as a ticket collector for a bus company, and finally as a bus driver. He eventually moved up to become the owner of a bus service that operated between Trà Ôn and Cần Thơ. During this period, Soai was the leader of his own gang of bus drivers. In a struggle with a rival gang boss in 1940, he was seriously injured and had to give up his job.

=== Hòa Hảo ===
Around this time, he converted to Hòa Hảo, founded by Huỳnh Phú Sổ, and devoted his significant energies to advancing through the ranks of the sect. His third wife, Le thi Gam, took over his financial interests as well as management of his bus firm. He became the sect's leading military leader during World War II.

On 7–9 September 1945, a band of 15,000 Hoahaoists armed with hand-to-hand weapons, and aided by the Trotskyists, attacked the Việt Minh garrison at the port city of Cần Thơ, which the Hòa Hảo considered the rightful capital of their domain. They were led by Soái, his eldest son, Lâm Thành Nguyên, and Sổ's younger brother, but with their antiquated weapons, the Hòa Hảo were defeated and Sổ's men were massacred by the Việt Minh-controlled Advanced Guard Youth, who were reportedly aided by a nearby Japanese garrison. The slaughter was characterized by its savagery. After Sổ's death, Soái assumed the title of commander in chief of the Hòa Hảo armed forces.

During the 1950s, the new authority in Saigon, led by Ngô Đình Diệm, desired to relinquish the Hòa Hảo autonomy. Diệm demanded that Soái hand over control of his administrative region to the Saigon government. Soái refused this, and Diệm dispatched the Vietnamese National Army (VNA) to the region and threatened to level Soái's headquarters if the Hòa Hảo forces resisted. Nevertheless, the Diệm government paid $3 million for Soái's loyalty.

As the VNA wiped out most of Bình Xuyên's forces, an independent military force within the army, Soái, along with other Hòa Hảo generals, declared war on Saigon government in late May 1955, furious that they were not granted enough privileges. They knew that a direct confrontation with the VNA would be catastrophic, so they burned down to their bases and dispersed their army of 16,000 men into the jungle to operate as guerrillas. The Americans did not discourage Diệm from fighting back this time. The VNA, led by the General Dương Văn Minh, went on an offensive on 5 June and by mid-June, the army crushed Soái's forces near the Cambodian border, forcing him to retreat into Cambodia. Two other generals surrendered and another general, Ba Cụt, was arrested and beheaded in front of the public after being convicted of a series of murders in court.

He resigned in 1956, and died in Saigon on 9 February 1961.

== Sources ==
- Fall, Bernard (1963). The Two Viet-Nams: A Political and Military Analysis. New York: Praeger Publishers. ISBN 0999141791.
- G. Marr, David (2013). Vietnam: State, War, and Revolution (1945–1946). Berkeley, California: University of California Press. ISBN 978-0520274150.
- Fall, Bernard (September 1955). "The Political-Religious Sects of Viet-Nam". Pacific Affairs. 28 (3): 235–253. doi:10.2307/3035404. JSTOR 3035404.
- T. Jr McAlister, John (1969). Vietnam, The Origins of Revolution. New York: Alfred A. Knopf for the Center of International Studies, Prince University. LCCN 69010690.
- Tai, Hue-Tam Ho (1983). Millenarianism and Peasant Politics in Vietnam. Harvard University Press. ISBN 978-0-674-43369-4. OCLC 900822076.
- Dommen, Arthur J. (2001). The Indochinese Experience of the French and the Americans: Nationalism and Communism in Cambodia, Laos, and Vietnam. Indiana University Press. ISBN 0253338549.
- Jacobs, Seth (2004). America's Miracle Man in Vietnam: Ngo Dinh Diem, Religion, Race, and U.S. Intervention in Southeast Asia (Second ed.). Duke University Press. ISBN 0822334291. ISSN 2692-0514.
- Moyar, Mark (2009). Triumph Forsaken: The Vietnam War, 1954–1965. Cambridge University Press. ISBN 978-0521757638.
- Thi Lâm, Quang (2001). The Twenty-five Year Century: A South Vietnamese General Remembers the Indochina War to the Fall of Saigon. University of North Texas Press. ISBN 1574411438.
- Currey, Cech B. (2011) [1998]. "Dewey, Albert Peter". In Tucker, Spencer C. (ed.). Encyclopedia of the Vietnam War (Second ed.). ABC-Clio. ISBN 978-1851099603.
