= Hòa Hảo =

Vietnamese new religious movement founded in 1939

Symbol of Hòa Hảo Buddhism

Hòa Hảo is a Vietnamese new religious movement. It is described either as a syncretistic folk religion or as a sect of Buddhism. It was founded in Cochinchina in 1939 by Huỳnh Phú Sổ (1920–47), who is regarded as a saint by its devotees. It is one of the major religions of Vietnam with between one million and eight million adherents, mostly in the Mekong Delta.

The religious philosophy of Hòa Hảo, which rose from the Miền Tây region of the Mekong Delta, is essentially Buddhist. It reforms and revises the older Bửu Sơn Kỳ Hương tradition of the region, and possesses quasi-millenarian elements. Hòa Hảo is an amalgam of Buddhism, ancestor worship, animistic rites, elements of Confucian doctrine, and the White Lotus religion, transformed and adapted to the mores and customs of the peasants of the region. Coming from the remote edges of Southern Vietnam, it opposes urban life and prefers a communitarian lifestyle. Unlike orthodox Buddhism, Hòa Hảo eschews elaborate rituals and temples, maintains no monastic order, and teaches home practice. It also advocates that each devotee can have direct communion with the Buddha, and that inner faith is more important than external rites. Regular Hòa Hảo rites are limited to four prayers a day, while the devotees are to maintain the Three Fundamental Bonds and Five Constant Virtues.

The influence of colonial overlords, the growing intensity of war from the late 1930s to the mid-1970s, and the attendant ideological conflicts all shaped the inception and later development of Hòa Hảo. It was, along with Hồ Chí Minh's Việt Minh and another religious movement known as Cao Đài, one of the first groups to engage in military conflict with colonial powers, first the French and then the Japanese. Hòa Hảo flourished under the Japanese occupation of World War II, with its adherents largely being peasants, tenants, and agricultural workers. It transformed into a militant and nationalist religion, and rapidly developed into a private army that operated mainly for the benefit of its leaders, while setting up its own virtually autonomous government in the region. The Hòa Hảo remained an autonomous force in Vietnamese politics after the war, opposing both French colonialists and the Việt Minh movement.

During the First Indochina War, disagreements with other major factions made the Hòa Hảo an aggressive religio-political-military cult. Sổ was kidnapped and executed by the Việt Minh while coming back from an unsuccessful conference to resolve issues with the Communists. Many Hoahaoists hailed him as a Messianic figure who would arrive in a time of crisis. Sổ's death led to factionalism, parochialism, and outside organizational influence. The Hòa Hảo led a war against the Communists, being labelled as the "strongest anti-Việt Minh element in the country". Nevertheless, the Hòa Hảo, along with other religio-political organizations, dominated the political and social scene of Southern Vietnam by the 1950s, claiming a stake in the formation of a non-communist South Vietnam.

After 1954, the Hòa Hảo initiated armed opposition to President Ngô Đình Diệm's American-backed government. They controlled various southern and western regions of South Vietnam at the time of Diệm's death in 1963. They then led a campaign against Việt Cộng for the defense of their home provinces during the Vietnam War, becoming a major autonomous political force in South Vietnam until the Fall of Saigon in 1975. Disbanded by the new government, the Hòa Hảo were oppressed and struggled for rights following the war. Only in 1999 were they officially recognized by the state, but the government imposes harsh controls on dissenting Hòa Hảo groups that do not follow the state-sanctioned branch.

The Hòa Hảo sought to preserve their religious identity and independence. They made temporary alliances with past enemies. Originally concerned only with religious autonomy, the Hòa Hảo struggled against the French, the Japanese, the Việt Minh, again the French, the newly independent South Vietnam, the Việt Cộng, and the North Vietnamese Army. They enjoyed political influence during post-Diệm regimes of Saigon.

== Designation ==
=== Name ===
Hòa Hảo is a new religious movement and it was named after the founder Huỳnh Phú Sổ's native village of Hoa Hao (Hòa Hảo; Vietnamese: [hwaː˨˩ haːw˧˩]; chữ Hán: 和好; literally "peace and amicability"), in what is now Thốt Nốt District of An Giang Province, Vietnam. The name is also spelled as Hoa-Hao. Another label, Hoahaoism, is also rendered as Hoa Haoism. It has also been called Hoa Hao Buddhism (Phật Giáo Hòa Hảo). The village of Hoa Hao was renamed Phú Mỹ by the contemporary Communist government.

Initially, the followers of the movement were called Dao Xen, literally meaning the "Followers of Xen", in reference to Sổ's childhood nickname.

=== Classification ===
The religious group has been traditionally classified as a Buddhist sect. General Joseph Lawton Collins, who served as a U.S. Special Representative in Vietnam, described Hòa Hảo as a "pseudo-religious sect", adding that it "appealed to the peasants with a veneer of Buddhism and a protective paternalism". Indeed, the American press of the 1950s labelled Hòa Hảo as "a pseudo-religious sect which follows a perverted form of Buddhism", and as "a rowdy sect of dissident Buddhists" whose founder "was sent to a lunatic asylum".

Despite this, other sources refer to it as a distinct syncretistic folk religion.

== Origins ==
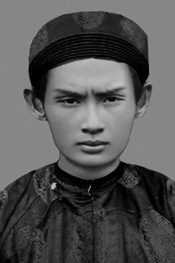
Huỳnh Phú Sổ

Flag of the Hòa Hảo used since their foundation

Hòa Hảo was founded by Huỳnh Phú Sổ (1919–1947), an ethnic Vietnamese born in 1919 to a Roman Catholic family of small-holders. The religious movement was found in the remote Miền Tây region of the Mekong Delta, which was known as Transbassac under French colonial rule. In the mid-nineteenth century, the Mekong Delta was a rough frontier society; the political power was shaky, social relations were tenuous, and religious currents were diverse. Buddhism, Taoism, Confucianism, and various spirit cults all had differing impacts on the population. The ethnic Vietnamese interacted with Cambodians and Chinese, and everyone was forced to accept French colonial rule in 1867. The religion arose from a tangle of mysticism, magic, and witchcraft, which could be found in most of the region's local beliefs. Rooted in earlier Vietnamese anti-colonial religious traditions, the Hòa Hảo philosophy claims to be based on the thoughts of Phật Thầy Tây An (1807–1856), known as Đạo Bửu Sơn Kỳ Hương. Tây An, in the 1830s, prophesied the collapse of the Nguyễn Vietnam at the hands of Western powers; the prophecies survived his death and spread throughout the Miền Tây, resulting in two major rebellions in 1875 and 1913 in which the region's French administration was nearly deposed.

Sổ received no particular education as a child and did not associate with monks, Confucian-minded thinkers, or Westernized intelligentsia. He was afflicted by an unknown illness since he was 15, a failed candidate for the Cao Đài. This prompted him to leave his native village of Hòa Hảo in 1939 and go to the Bảy Núi range 60 kilometres (37 mi) away. There, amid hermits and spiritual leaders, he obtained unorthodox Buddhist knowledge and a composite spiritual education. Sổ founded the religion on the eighteenth day of the fifth lunar month of the year kỷ mão, according to the Vietnamese lunisolar calendar, or 4 July 1939, according to the Gregorian calendar. He declared himself a prophet, and began preaching a doctrine based on faith and simplicity; he traveled throughout Vietnam practicing herbal healing and acupuncture. In the second half of 1939, Sổ's declamations were concurrently published. They took the shape of several small collections of texts written in verse (sấm giảng; lit. 'prophetic teachings') that were distributed to the general populace free of charge.

By the end of the year, Sổ gathered ten thousand followers and by 1940 had a following of over 100,000 converts. Also, Sổ had reached another two million people in Miền Tây through his preaching. The devotees were easily recognizable as they wore amulets that bore the inscription "Bửu Sơn Kỳ Hương". Sổ was certain about the necessity for ordinary peasants to believe in the movement, and their pleas for allegiance were successful. There were two major reasons for his success: the prophecies he made about the outbreak of World War II and the conquest of Southeast Asia by Japan, and his work as a mystical healer—his patients claimed to have been miraculously cured of all manner of serious illnesses after seeing him, when Western medicine had failed. He proclaimed himself as the reincarnation of the Buddha, and he was regarded as such. According to the Austrian politician Joseph Buttinger, the masses held the movement's native origins in high regard.

Sổ became a wildly popular leader as his faithful group grew in size. His influence quickly expanded beyond religious matters, and he became a powerful figure in lay affairs as well. The Hòa Hảo grew from a purely religious movement to encompass an impressive lay power structure centered on Cần Tho Province. Sổ's religious prescriptions quickly merged with nationalist, anti-colonial sentiment, and he quickly rose to prominence as a key nationalist figure. The group grew into the Mekong Delta's most powerful nationalist force, with strong sentiment against the colonial French rulers and the landlords who dominated the agriculture of Cochinchina. The Hòa Hảo played a crucial role in the anti-colonial, nationalist fervor that grew in the years leading up to World War II. It ultimately became a homegrown political movement in the region. Despite this, the Hòa Hảo, according to Edwin E. Moise, were patriotic and anti-nationalist in nature. He argued that they were too small to have a realistic possibility of governing a national government, thus a powerful central government had to imply control of their districts by a government ruled by people, not beliefs; they preferred a weaker government in order to gain a de facto autonomy. Meanwhile, other anti-French organizations arose, the most notable of which was the Indochinese Communist Party's (ICP) Việt Minh, which was led by Hồ Chí Minh and became the sole anti-colonial organization to establish a grassroots structure. The movement's leadership competed with the Communist movement for the peasants' support, though initial conflict was not about the Việt Minh's then-hidden Communist ideas, but rather about the fact that they were not native to the region.

== Expansion ==
=== World War II ===
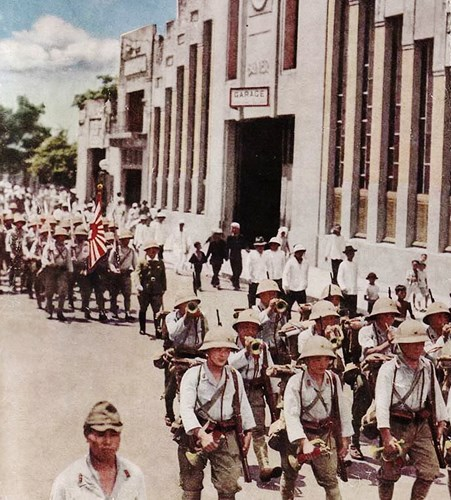
Imperial Japanese forces entering Saigon, 1940

Early prophecies of Sổ began to come true: he anticipated the eruption of a major war in the Far East and the expulsion of the French by Asians. World War II and the Japanese occupation of Indochina seemed to confirm his predictions. By 1940, he had gained such influence that the Vichy French governor Jean Decoux, fearing anti-French revolts, had Sổ imprisoned in Bạc Liêu under the pretense that he was a lunatic. The imprisonment of Sổ was seen by his followers as an unforgivable act of war against the faith itself. In prison, Sổ succeeded in converting his psychiatrist, Dr. Tam, who became an ardent supporter. A board of French psychiatrists declared him sane in May 1941, though he was exiled upon his release. His key supporters were sent to a concentration camp in Nui Bara. The French restrictions strengthened his nationalist appeal, and Bạc Liêu soon became a place of Hòa Hảo pilgrimage, although it was far from the movement's strongholds. He used the pilgrims to spread religious fervor and anti-French sentiment. In 1942, the French could no longer withstand the growing popular reactions generated by Sổ's oracular pronouncements and political instructions, so they exiled him to Laos.

The Japanese quickly recognized the Hòa Hảo movement as a powerful anti-colonialist force. As they took over French Indochina, they intercepted and relocated Sổ to Saigon (nowadays Hồ Chí Minh City), placing him under the protection of the Kenpeitai. The Japanese authorities rebuffed French demands for extradition by saying that he was held as a "Chinese spy". The extent of the Japanese military assistance is unknown, and some historians speculate that the Hòa Hảo benefited from the general availability of weapons during wartime, but nevertheless, the first Hoahaoist armed militias emerged in the Mekong Delta towards the end of 1943. Initially, they were used as village patrols, called self-defense forces. They then created battle formations to fight landlords, authorities, and French forces across the delta. This led to the Hòa Hảo becoming less of a religious and more of a military-political movement, as people such as landowners converted in the hope that they could gain protection. Under Japanese protection, the religious movement grew quickly. Though Sổ was unable to leave Saigon, his missionaries recruited on his behalf, using the combination of doom-laden prophesies and veiled threats against those who would not join, as well as the distribution of cures and amulets. They supported Cường Để, a member of Vietnam's Nguyễn royal dynasty residing in exile in Japan, as the legitimate ruler of Vietnam. Sổ felt powerful enough to make a pact with F. Moresco, the Sureté director in Saigon, to denounce members of competing groups in exchange for immunity. By late 1944, there were up to a million Hòa Hảo devotees. Sổ used his authority to subvert colonial administration in regions where he had influence. The Hòa Hảo took over the role of colonial courts, converted French-led Vietnamese troops, and supplied the Japanese forces with rice.

The Hòa Hảo had accepted Japanese assistance as a means of bolstering themselves against future threats, having been in conflicts with both the French and the Việt Minh. The Hòa Hảo had a capable military force in place by the end of World War II, thanks to Japanese patronage, and had taken the offensive throughout the western Mekong Delta. Sổ and the Hòa Hảo began to mobilize against Japanese military troops in order to demonstrate their credentials as a resolute nationalist organization hostile to all foreign powers, having obtained the military strength required to ensure the religious community's survival. During the Japanese patronage, Sổ wrote new religious texts that no longer referenced catastrophic millenarian notions, but rather to a Pure Land Buddhism. Also, he entered politics openly by creating the Village People Party in 1944, known as Dân Xã for short. Sổ claimed that instead of politicizing religion, he was bringing religion into politics.

=== August Revolution ===
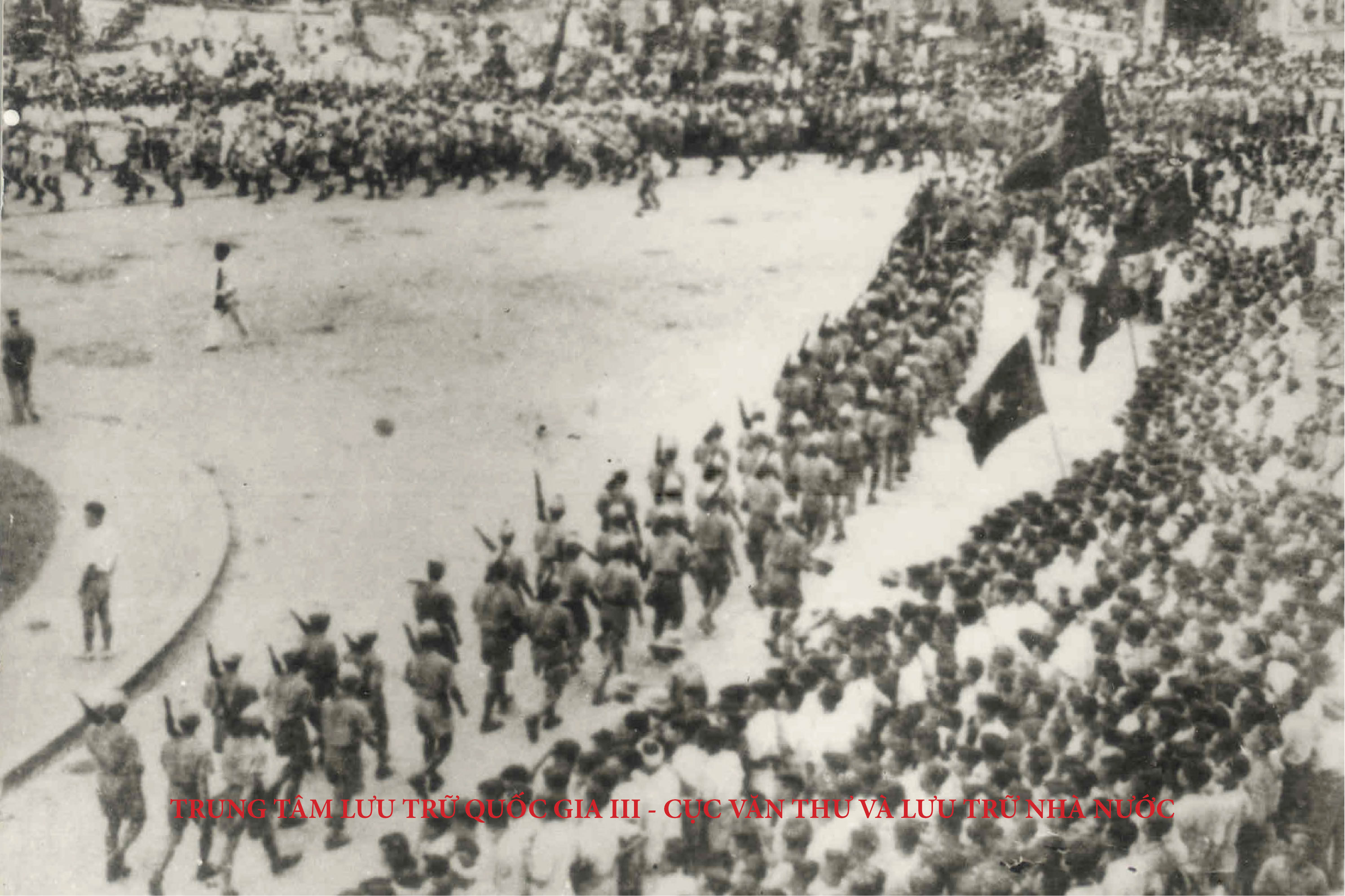
August Revolution in Hanoi, 1945

Sổ avoided the stigma of being labeled a Japanese puppet by forecasting the empire's defeat months in advance. His movement joined the nationalist front that took power in the interregnum following Japan's surrender to establish a united resistance to both the Japanese and the French. Sổ requested and received a Communist cadre to assist him in training his followers. The Japanese requested from Sổ and his followers more crops, but instead, he advised peasants to stop farming, putting his new alliance with the ICP in jeopardy, as the Communists regarded southern rice as critical to ending the northern famine. Peasants were persuaded to partially restore production levels by local Communists, and the ICP maintained its precarious unity with the Hòa Hảo in the common cause of independence. The Hòa Hảo, Việt Minh, and Cao Đài, another religious group, united in the independence effort and the ICP took power in Saigon during the August Revolution. The Việt Minh proclaimed themselves to be Vietnam's legitimate government. The French, alongside the Cao Đài and Hòa Hảo, other local political organizations, and the Binh Xuyen forces all disputed this claim. Thus, the Hòa Hảo clashed with Việt Minh as well as the Cao Đài. Militarily superior to the Việt Minh, the Hòa Hảo became the main political power in the Mekong Delta region, constituting a huge threat to the Communists. The religious leadership was unwilling to toe the Việt Minh line from Hanoi.

On 7–9 September 1945, a band of 15,000 Hoahaoists armed with hand-to-hand weapons and aided by the Trotskyists, attacked the Việt Minh garrison at the port city of Cần Thơ, which the Hòa Hảo considered the rightful capital of their domain. They were led by Trần Văn Soái (1889–1961), his eldest son, Lâm Thành Nguyên (1904–1977), and Sổ's younger brother, but with their antiquated weapons, the Hòa Hảo were defeated and Sổ's men were massacred by the Việt Minh-controlled Advanced Guard Youth, who were reportedly aided by a nearby Japanese garrison. The slaughter, characterized by its savagery, prompted a retaliatory campaign of mass killing against the Communists from the Hòa Hảo delta strongholds. The bodies of Communist cadres' were bound together and dumped in rivers and canals. In villages where the Hòa Hảo were in charge, corpses were also displayed in public to test outsiders' political inclinations. Those who expressed their discomfort with the sight were assumed to be Việt Minh sympathizers.

French colonial rule in Vietnam was disrupted during World War II. The German occupation of France and the subsequent collaboration of Vichy France with the Axis powers served to delegitimize French claims of sovereignty. Nevertheless, the French and the British took advantage of the anti-colonial forces' disunity and pushed the pro-independence forces out of Saigon over the next few weeks, during Operation Masterdom. The Hòa Hảo forces blocked the route, obstructing the Communist retreat. Late in September, the ICP sought to reconcile with the Hòa Hảo, but Sổ, who was skeptical of them, turned them down. The Việt Minh then executed two Hòa Hảo leaders, Sổ's brother, and one of his Trotskyist advisers in October; by now, the uneasy alliance had collapsed.

=== First Indochina War ===
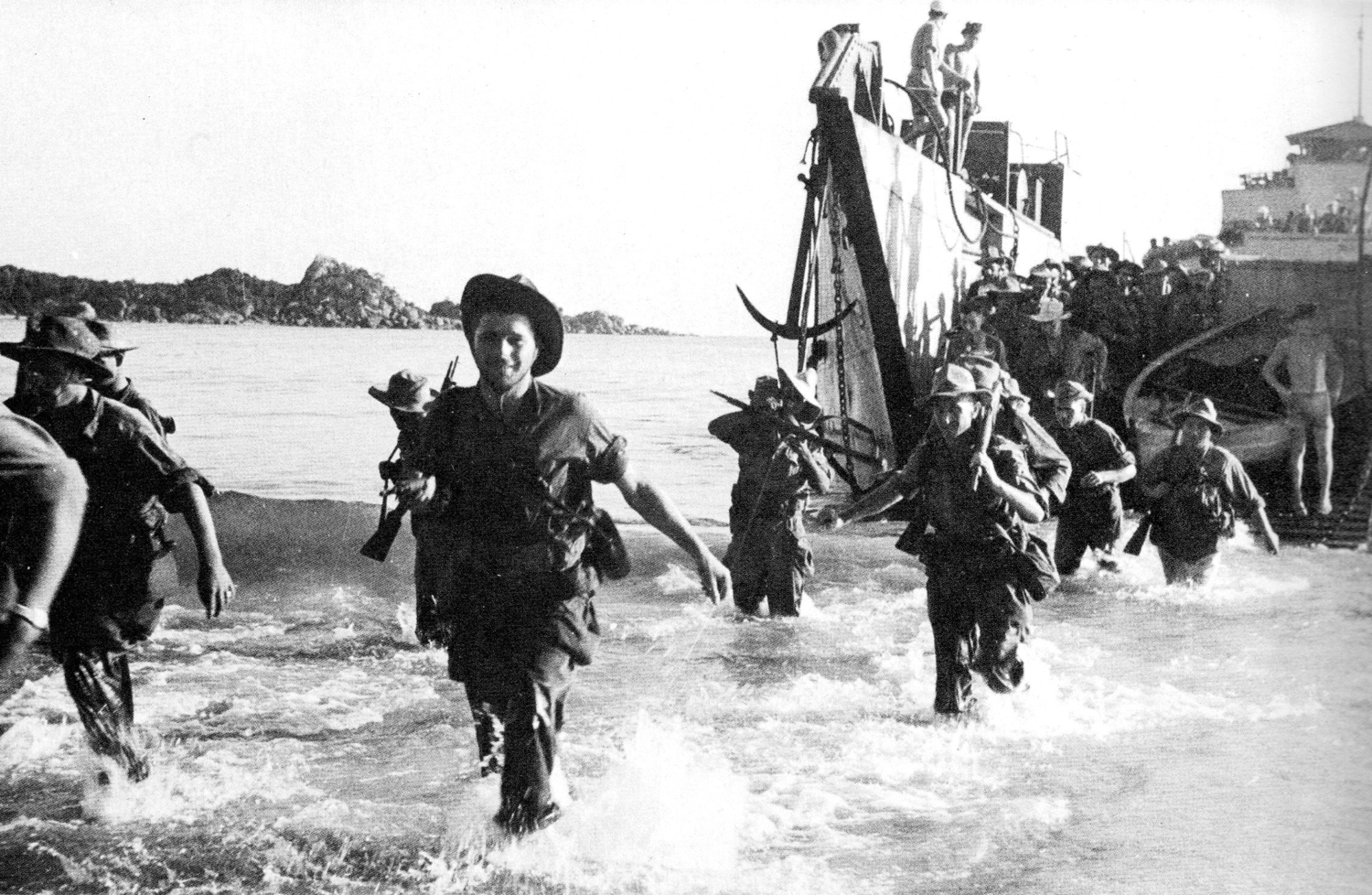
French marines landing in Annam, July 1950

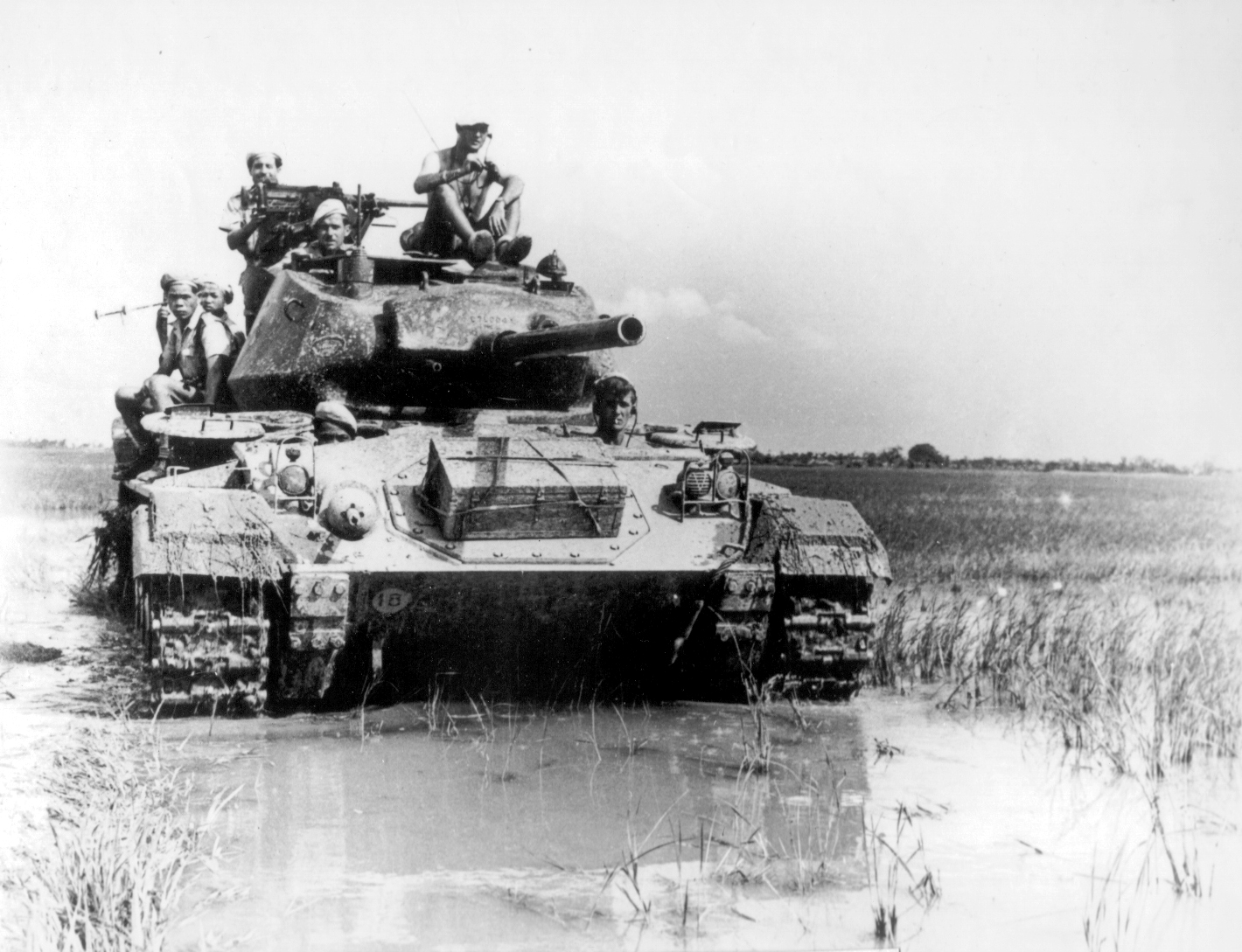
French M24 Chaffee in Vietnam

The return of the French colonial regime helped to keep the Hòa Hảo and the Việt Minh apart, but it was also a major disappointment to the Hòa Hảo. Sổ had hoped that his religious movement would become the de facto ruling power throughout most of Cochinchina, but the arrival of a larger French force put an end to such ambitions. The Hòa Hảo turned inward to strengthen their religious power and expand their political influence in the Mekong Delta. As the French grew increasingly skeptical of the Việt Minh, they started aiding the Hòa Hảo. In fact, throughout the First Indochina War (1946–1954), the French government issued support payments for Cao Đài, Hòa Hao, and Bình Xuyên armed forces in exchange for defense of the territories they controlled against the Việt Minh. They granted the Hòa Hảo hegemony over the southwestern Mekong Delta and eventually provided arms for some 20,000 Hoahaoists. In return for aid against the Việt Minh, the new Hòa Hảo leadership was willing to form alliances with the colonialists; they did not see such an agreement as a betrayal of their nationalist ideals because the ultimate goal of religious independence was not jeopardized. The Hòa Hảo periodically tied Việt Minh sympathizers together and threw them into the river to drown. The Việt Minh were worried by Sổ's nationalist credentials and social structure, and attempted to co-opt him into a National Unified Front (NUF).

Moreover, Sơn Ngọc Thành, the Prime Minister of Cambodia, recognized the Democratic Republic of Vietnam when it was founded in 1945. Southern Vietnamese Việt Minh commanders established contact with Thành to orchestrate resistance to the French. For negotiations, the Khmer government sent a delegation. The talks collapsed after this delegation made itself unpopular by pressing the issue of Cambodia's irredentist claims over the Mekong Delta. The Hòa Hảo clashed with the Khmers in Trà Vinh province, and the French were determined to act firmly against Thành's government. The colonial authorities apprehended Thành, who was arrested and imprisoned upon his return to Saigon. Thành, who had been exiled to France, did not return to Cambodia until 1951.

The Hòa Hảo perceived that religious supremacy required territorial hegemony as well. The religion's leadership demanded virtually autonomous control of affairs within its sphere of influence. This included participation in local government in places where it exercised coherent religious control. American officer and author John B. Haseman suggests that a key reason for the emergence of a Hòa Hảo–Việt Minh conflict so early in the anti-colonialist struggle was the latter's refusal to accept the Hòa Hảo demand for political predominance inside its sphere. Although the Hòa Hảo appeared to be politically unstable on the surface as they swung between ideological affiliations, their actions had a core constancy of purpose. As the French discovered, the religious leadership's main goal was territorial political hegemony. The Hòa Hảo's alliance with the French lasted only as long as was necessary to obtain French arms. The Hòa Hảo, having the patronage of the colonial power, were able to hold off the Việt Minh during the latter's rise to dominance in the NUF. The Hòa Hảo repudiated the colonialists in 1947 and cautiously approached the NUF. The Hòa Hảo had suspicions for NUF for a long time; their transition in allegiance from the colonialists to the NUF was not a huge break. Their effort was primarily aimed at securing control of the western Mekong Delta. The Hòa Hảo, bolstered by French arms, revolted against the French because they believed that colonial control in Vietnam would be overthrown by Asians.

The Hòa Hảo's alliance with the Việt Minh was short-lived and the NUF dissolved in July 1946, while Sổ became estranged from his military leaders. It was immediately evident that the Hòa Hảo's demands for religious autonomy and political sovereignty were irreconcilable with Việt Minh ambitions. Soon after, Sổ was preaching with growing zeal against the Việt Minh, whom he saw as posing an even greater threat to the religious movement than the French. The conflict with the Việt Minh devolved into a holy war. Sổ preached that every Hòa Hảo who killed ten Việt Minh would have a direct path to heaven. The Communists attacked the Hòa Hảo positions between 23 March and 6 April 1947, forcing the Hòa Hảo military to retreat to Long Xuyên. On 18 April 1947, Sổ was invited to a Việt Minh stronghold in the Plain of Reeds for a conciliation meeting. He refused the Communists' demands and made for home, but he was halted while sailing through Long Xuyên on the Đốc Vàng Hạ River, most of his company was slain, and he was arrested by the southern Việt Minh leader Nguyễn Bình. Sổ was killed, and to prevent the Hoahaoists from recovering his remains and erecting a martyr's shrine, the Việt Minh quartered Sổ's body and scattered his remains across the country; his remains were never found.

== Post-Sổ period ==
Sổ's death created a power vacuum within the religious leadership. Because he was the sole unexceptional candidate among vying competitors, Sổ's father Huỳnh Công Bộ was hurriedly chosen to succeed him as its leader. He was the former chief of the Hòa Hảo village, and served as the religious doctrine's guardian and movement's leader until his death. Despite this, he lacked his son's charm, authority, political savvy, and ideological obsession. Therefore, the movement began to lose momentum, leading to factionalism, parochialism, and outside organization influence, which caused an increase in violence as the various internal factions engaged in conflicts among themselves. The religious group split into four factions, each led by a former military subordinate of Sổ, while Soái assumed the title of commander in chief of the Hòa Hảo armed forces. The factionalized leaders were far more violent, resorting to public burnings, beheadings, and mass executions of ethnic Khmers and Vietnamese. None of the military commanders were concerned with anything other than their own self-promotion, and none of the civilian leaders had Sổ's capacity to guide them or preach moderation. Their violence was not limited to South Vietnam; they would cross borders and pillage Cambodian villages. Local Khmers responded by creating defense groups to fight the Hòa Hảo, while others converted to assure their safety. Despite this, the Hòa Hảo declared eternal war against the Communists. Haseman argues that Sổ's assassination was a major miscalculation on the part of the Việt Minh, who falsely believed at the time that the Hòa Hảo lacked the strength to fight both the French and the Communists. By mid-1947, the Hoahaoists were committed to armed combat against the Việt Minh. During the First Indochina War, because of their shared antipathy towards the Việt Minh and the need to find a source of financial support to replace French wartime subsidies, Hòa Hảo maintained a level of cooperation with Cao Đài and Bình Xuyên. In the months leading up to the Franco–Việt Minh ceasefire, these shared interests held the factions together. They temporarily halted their conflicts with the French, signing a military treaty with them on 8 May 1947, less than a month after Sổ's assassination.

=== Delta triumvirate ===
Following Sổ's assassination, the religious movement expanded its territory to include Cần Thơ Province. They controlled over a third of southern Vietnam, elected their own officials, and built significant infrastructure for collecting taxes and recruiting armed forces. Soái formed an alliance with the French, providing Hòa Hảo troops as auxiliary forces; however, several other Hòa Hảo leaders refused to recognize Soái's leadership, and the religion continued to be riven by rivalries and factionalism. Nevertheless, it transformed into a French-backed 20,000-strong army. They ruled most of the upper central delta, and, along with the Cao Đài and Bình Xuyên, established a triumvirate in the mid-1950s, early in the Vietnam War (1955–1975), that grew in strength and constituted a significant threat to South Vietnam. This republic was regarded by the Hòa Hảo as just another in a series of central governments aiming to subjugate the Hòa Hảo to their rule.

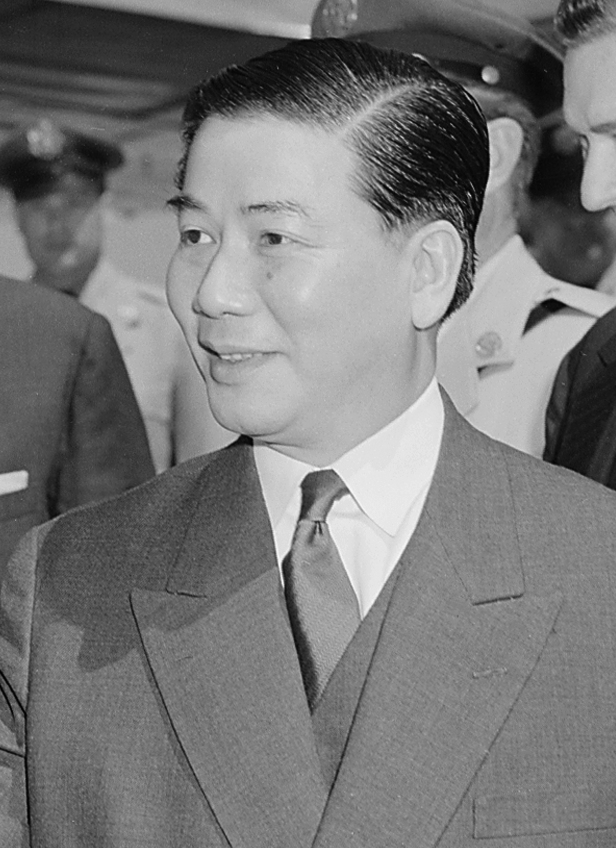
South Vietnamese president Ngô Đình Diệm during a meeting with the U.S. President Eisenhower, 8 May 1957.

The new authority in Saigon, led by President Ngô Đình Diệm, succeeded in expelling the French, a long-held ambition of the Hòa Hảo. When the French sought to build up the Vietnamese National Army (VNA) in 1952, relations with them started to deteriorate. The Hòa Hảo forces were adamant about preserving their autonomy, and one of their commanders withdrew his forces from the VNA, burning down the outposts they were assigned to guard. In February 1955, the French cut off funding to the Hòa Hảo and Cao Đại, and the groups' leaders were forced to seek funding from two wealthy individuals: Diệm and Bình Xuyên leader Lê Văn Viễn. Colonel Edward Lansdale, who became one of Diệm's closest American confidants, met with the movement's leaders on Diệm's behalf, offering them money and applauding Diệm's nationalism. Diệm and his brother, Ngô Đình Nhu, also had direct dealings with religious leaders. While key figures of the movement agreed to support the government in exchange for millions of U.S. dollars, others were less receptive to Diệm's pleadings, and many grew bitter when they discovered Diệm expected them to relinquish their autonomy. They were especially concerned about Diệm's demand that Soái hand over control of his administrative region to the Saigon government, and also Diệm's response to Soái's refusal; Diệm dispatched the VNA to the region and threatened to level Soái's headquarters if the Hòa Hảo forces resisted. The government also relocated around a hundred thousand northern Catholics in An Giang Province. Furthermore, Hòa Hảo sources claimed that VNA troops were desecrating their sites of worship on Diệm's orders, who was already accused of creating an all-Catholic sectarian army that was seeking to Catholicisize the country.

Văn Viễn retaliated by allying with other Cao Đại and Hòa Hảo leaders, as he offered them money from his vast wealth, to form the United Front of Nationalist Forces (UFNF) in opposition to the Saigon government in early March 1955. With the mounting opposition to Diệm, they began scooping up strategically located houses in Saigon to use as bases for attacks on the Saigon government's critical installations. The Nguyễn dynasty's emperor, Bảo Đại, supported the UFNF and assured the Americans that Diệm was completely incapable of fulfilling his job. When Diệm and the Americans sought to buy Bảo Đại's support, he turned them down since they offered less money than he was receiving from the Bình Xuyên. The UFNF tried to seek U.S. support in deposing Diệm, though the Americans rejected this and threatened that if anyone attempted to topple Diệm, they would back him up. The UFNF then looked for ways to destabilize Diệm's government without staging a coup. The movement's leaders presented him with an ultimatum, demanding representation in the South Vietnamese government and funding for their military, which were required to maintain control over the regional fiefdoms they ruled; this was refused by Diệm.

=== Sect crisis ===
General J. Lawton Collins believed that Diệm would be doomed if he yielded in to the movement's demands. He thought that the groups' boldness in presenting this ultimatum strongly suggested that they were planning anti-Diệm rallies in Saigon. According to Collins, the Saigon government could not have allowed rallies to go unchallenged and had to intervene to put an end to them. He advised Diệm to reach an agreement with the UFNF in order to persuade its members to becoming government loyalists. Initially, Diệm agreed to negotiate with the UFNF leaders, but when they stated that their demands were non-negotiable, he abandoned the idea. He was certain that the VNA would carry out his orders to suppress any opposition group, as he had gained the loyalty of many army officers in recent months and had replaced many others who had not. Collins, however, underestimated the army's support for Diệm and advised him to avoid using brute force and instead seek a compromise. Though Collins discouraged Diệm from executing his plans against Bình Xuyên, the latter, suspicious of a VNA attack, made a move on Diệm loyalists without first seeking America's consent. This resulted in a conflict between the two that temporarily halted with a ceasefire enforced by the French Commissioner-General Paul Ély. Collins went to Washington with the determination that Diệm had to be replaced. U.S. President Dwight Eisenhower honored his decision and U.S. Secretary of State John Foster Dulles penned telegrams to Saigon, informing Bảo Đại and other Vietnamese leaders to find a replacement for Diệm. These plans were halted when a new battle began in Saigon between the VNA and Bình Xuyên. The Diệm loyalists crushed Bình Xuyên, with the latter being saved from total annihilation only with Ély's intervention.

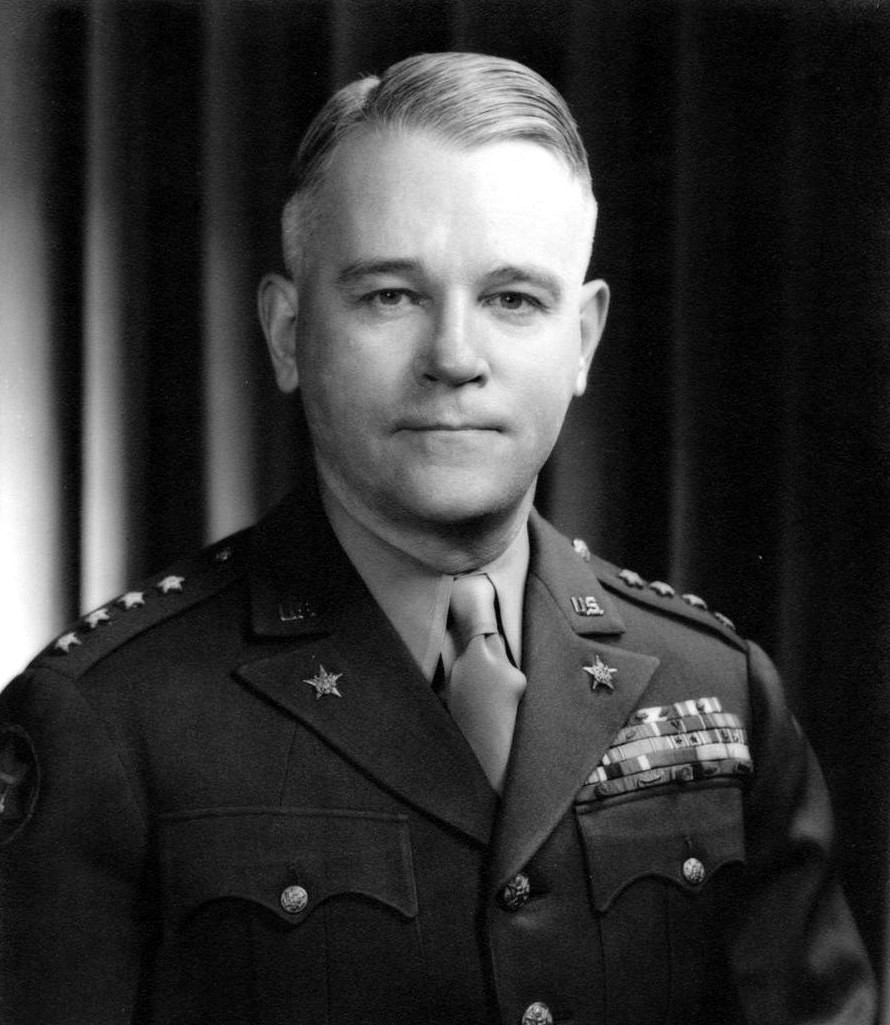
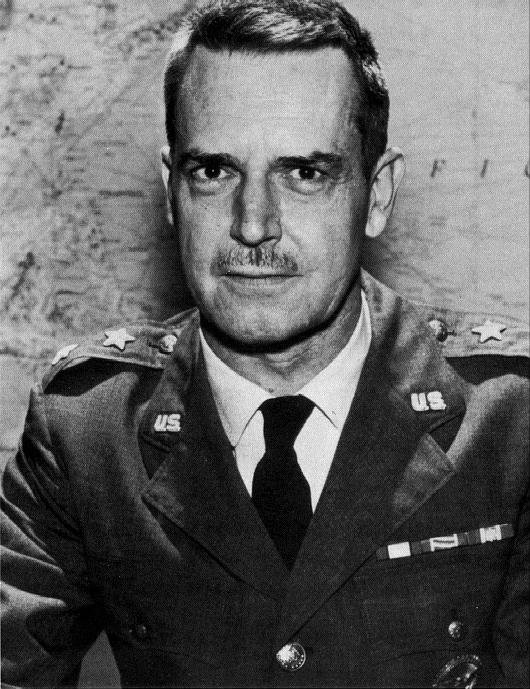
General J. Lawton Collins (above) and Colonel Edward Lansdale (below) were among the most influential Americans in Vietnam.

Trying to preserve the Bình Xuyên, French Prime Minister Edgar Faure declared Diệm's government incompetent. While Collins was in Washington, Ély spoke with Randolph Kidder, the acting U.S. ambassador, and urged the Americans to join with France to depose Diệm. Kidder did not know what the official U.S. government policy on Diệm was, so he spoke with uncertainty. While Kidder and Ely were arguing, 200 people gathered in the Saigon Town Hall to declare the General Assembly of the Democratic and Revolutionary Forces of the Nation. General Nguyễn Giác Ngộ (1897–1967) of the Hòa Hảo, accompanied by Trình Minh Thế and Nguyễn Thành Phương of the Cao Đại, led the assembly. Its members tore down a large photograph of Bảo Đại, hurled it out the window, and stomped on it in the street before the meeting started, and proceeded to condemn the French and their allies. The assembly then drafted a list of demands that included Bảo Đại's abdication, the removal of all French forces, and the formation of a new government headed by Diệm. They formed a committee to deliver the demands to the government, but when they arrived at the palace, they discovered General Nguyễn Văn Vy in Diệm's office, declaring that he was taking over the army as Bảo Đại had instructed. Vy was taken hostage and compelled to cancel his plans by several members of the committee. After a paratroop colonel threatened Diệm, he let Vy go, and Vy left the next day for Paris. By this point, reports of the clashes in South Vietnam had reached the United States, sparking an outpouring of support for Diệm among Congressmen and the general public. Collins' judgment was no longer acceptable to President Eisenhower and Dulles, and the president opted to completely back Diệm.

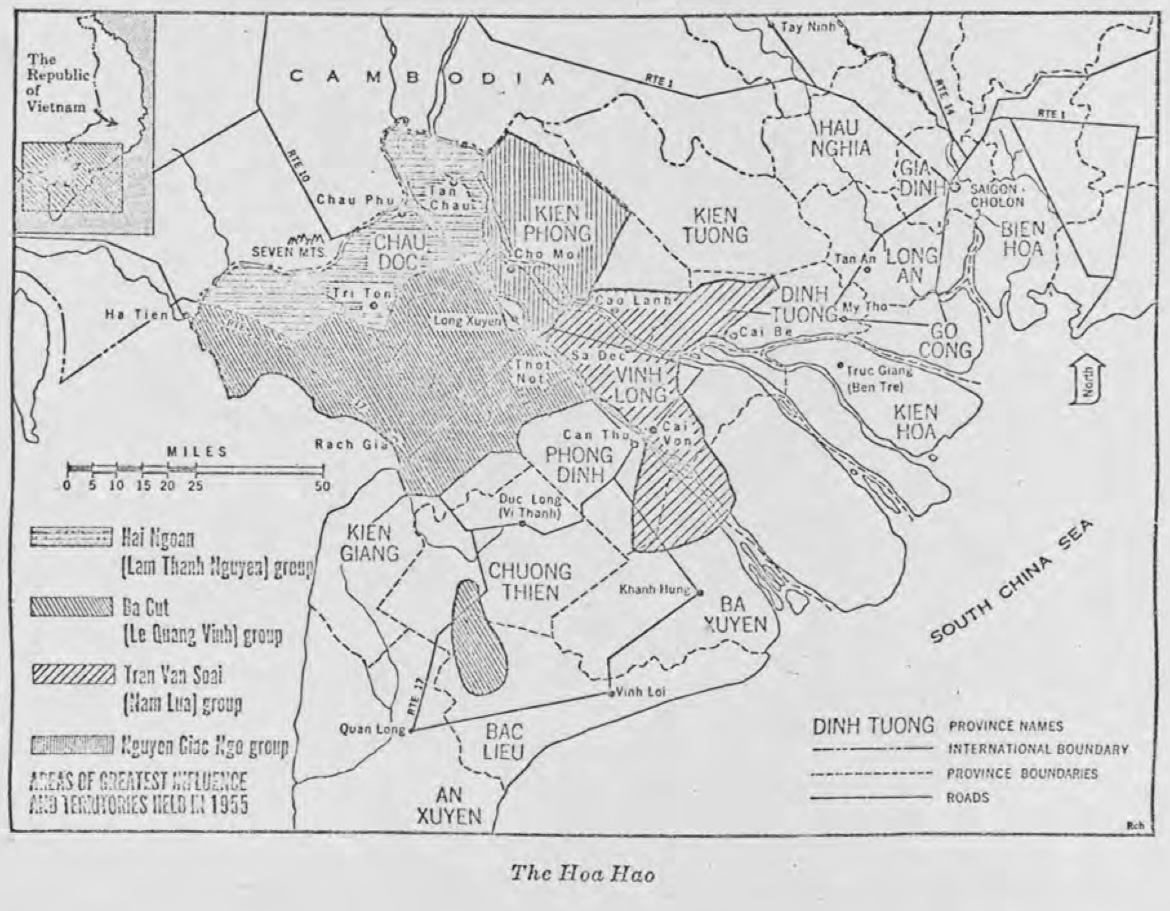
Territory controlled by the four generals of Hoà Hảo force in 1955

Furious that the Hòa Hảo had not been granted enough privileges, the four generals of the Hoà Hảo - Lâm Thành Nguyên, Ba Cụt, Trần Văn Soái, and Nguyễn Giác Ngộ - declared war on the Saigon government in late May 1955. They knew that a direct confrontation with the VNA would be catastrophic, so they burned down their bases and dispersed their army of 16,000 men into the jungle to operate as guerrillas. The Americans did not discourage Diệm from fighting back this time. The VNA, led by General Dương Văn Minh, went on an offensive on 5 June and, by mid-June, the army had crushed Soái's force near the Cambodian border, forcing him to retreat into Cambodia. Ngộ and Nguyên, disappointed by the rebellion's ineffectiveness, surrendered and turned over their armies to Saigon. Only Ba Cụt was left to continue the fighting. For the rest of 1955, the Republic army would pursue Ba Cụt's 3,000 men across the countryside.

=== 1955 referendum ===
During a referendum organized by Diệm in October, Hòa Hảo forces staged sporadic attacks on the polling stations of Cần Tho, though there was not much opposition to this political maneuver. Communist politician Lê Duẩn met with Soái and Ba Cụt, and, despite their ideological differences, they agreed to form the Southern Committee of the Patriotic Front, which eventually included remnants not only from the Hòa Hảo but also the Cao Đài and Bình Xuyên rebel armies. Soái declared the referendum unconstitutional, stating his preference for a true democratic state. Diệm's political maneuvers were also criticized by Ba Cụt, who claimed that the referendum was an opportunity to force the people to "depose Bảo Đại and proclaim the puppet Diệm as the chief-of-state of Vietnam". Diệm reportedly received $4 million in aid from the American government and American Catholic organizations to support the referendum, which Ba Cụt stated was part of an "American effort to Catholicize Vietnam". Diệm, according to Dân Xã, exploited American aid money for bribing "laborers and young students to petition in support of Diệm's ascent to chief-of-state and in favor of deposing Bảo Đại".

Some historians have questioned Diệm's critics' political relevance and sincerity. According to historian Robert Nathan, there was a shift in Vietnamese politics as a result of America's replacement of France as the primary foreign influence, and a burst of democratic and pseudo-democratic ideas and propaganda by pious people who were previously considered to be power-hungry politicians. According to Nathan, the adoption of democratic rhetoric by Hòa Hảo generals and their allies was meaningless because none of them rose to power. Moreover, the leaders of the Hòa Hảo were often dismissed by American officials at the time as "feudal" or "gangster", or of minor importance.

Diệm's government abolished all of the Hòa Hảo civil organizations; their religious rituals were to be kept strictly private, and all public celebrations were forbidden. Diệm's forces, now called the Army of the Republic of Vietnam (ARVN), spent much of 1956 fighting the Hòa Hảo insurgents, who continued to harass the government. Also, the Việt Minh established a few of their own units, disguising them with religious names like the "Hòa Hảo Liberation Company". The ARVN targeted the remaining Hòa Hảo rebels in the western Mekong Delta near the beginning of the year, inflicting crippling losses. Soái returned to Vietnam, but he and his 4,600-strong force surrendered in February. In April, a government patrol caught Ba Cụt, the last remaining rebel leader. After being convicted of a series of murders in court, he was guillotined in Cần Thơ on 13 July 1956, despite Lansdale's urges, as he worried that the execution would solidify Cụt's followers' hostility to the South Vietnamese government. Indeed, the bulk of Hòa Hảo followers joined the Việt Cộng, while the government obliterated Cụt's remaining guerrilla troops by May. By now, Sổ's younger sister Huỳnh Thị Kim Biên was the movement's new religious leader, and the Hòa Hảo were eventually destroyed by Saigon's considerably larger forces. ARVN's final operations in 1962 wiped out the Hòa Hảo military might. American historian Jessica M. Chapman argues that the infrastructure of the Hòa Hảo-controlled territories was not strong enough to function without foreign backing, as the previous French subsidies were the organization's "lifeblood".

=== Post-Diệm Vietnam ===
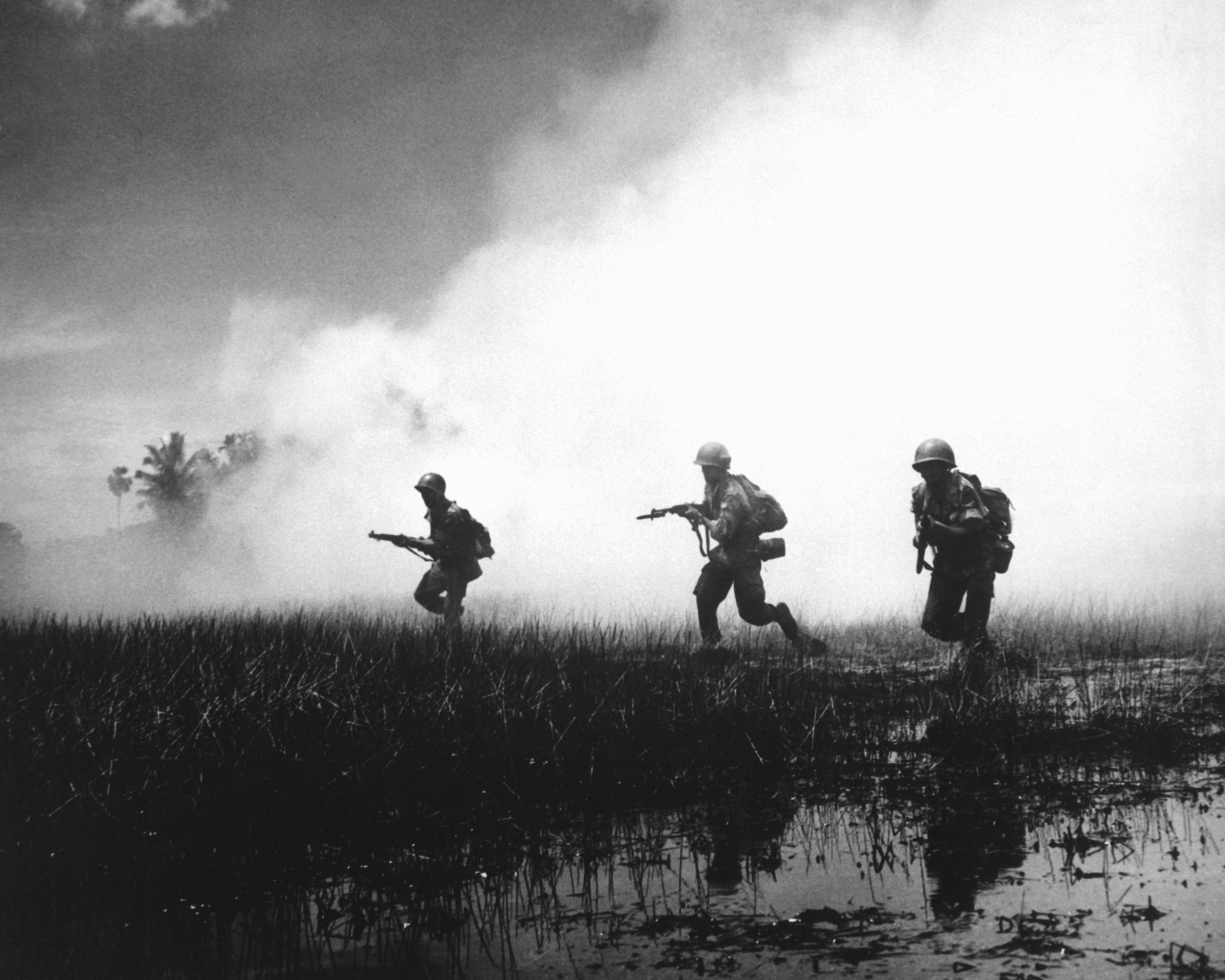
ARVN troops assaulting a stronghold in 1961

In South Vietnam, the overthrow of the Diệm regime in 1963 coincided with the outbreak of large-scale guerrilla warfare. Communist Party leaders, now in the Việt Cộng, which had a tremendous military strength throughout the country, in order to exert more effective control over the revolutionary struggle in the Mekong Delta, their strongest position, and to prevent the revolutionary vanguard from being ceded to Hòa Hảo. Despite their military setbacks, the Hòa Hảo maintained their political and religious control over the western portion of the Bassac River and Cần Thơ, the Mekong Delta's regional capital. They also preserved their arms and formed paramilitaries to defend the movement's geographical stronghold. The Hòa Hảo were too powerful for the Saigon government to continue fighting. Starting from Nguyễn Cao Kỳ's government in the mid-1960s, the Hòa Hảo were left alone in the Miền Tây and gained tacit permission to establish a form of sovereignty in exchange for acknowledging South Vietnam's authority. They resumed their conflict with the Communists as they were no longer forced to commit their military to the campaign against the central authority. The tacit agreement with the South Vietnamese government removed the necessity for keeping a reserve force. The Hòa Hảo used their new independence to launch a total war on the Việt Cộng. The ARVN aided the Hòa Hảo militia in their fight against the Communists by tying down the Việt Cộng's main force in nearby locations, allowing the militia to focus on fighting Communist guerrillas and infrastructure cadres. The anti-Communist campaign of the Hòa Hảo was accompanied by ruthless butchery, and the Communists retaliated in kind.

The significance of Hòa Hảo was recognized by every post-Diệm administration of South Vietnam. As a cohesive force in the Mekong Delta, the religious movement was now extremely valued; Hòa Hảo's military might and political influence were welcomed by the South Vietnamese government, and the Hòa Hảo provided tacit support to every post-Diệm regime in Saigon. Members of the religion gradually rose to positions of authority at all levels of government, from hamlet and village chiefs to national parliamentary representatives. By now, the Hòa Hảo had achieved their principal goal of religious independence. The orthodox Buddhist authority no longer discriminated against the Hòa Hảo on a religious basis.

It was the Hòa Hảo's military might, which was organized along religious lines, and capacity to ensure a high level of local security in the provinces it controlled that provided the group with its most powerful influencing lever. It was a religious force in every sense, tasked with the protection of the devotees. The Hòa Hảo formed a local militia after South Vietnam's armed forces were restructured, securing their heartlands and denying the Việt Cộng access to their agricultural riches. The Vietnamese Army was divided into three echelons: The ARVN was the regular army, and there were two echelons of territorial forces under the ARVN; the Popular Force and the Regional Force. Those in the Popular Force were only allowed to be assigned to areas within the district they resided, while those in the Regional Force were only allowed to be assigned to areas within the province they resided. This was a tremendous opportunity for the Hòa Hảo to establish a robust, unified force to defend their land and fight the Việt Cộng efficiently. Locals used to make up the Hòa Hảo's armed force, which was financed by local taxes levied on the devotees. Now, the Hòa Hảo were being paid by the Saigon government to defend themselves.

=== Fall of Saigon ===
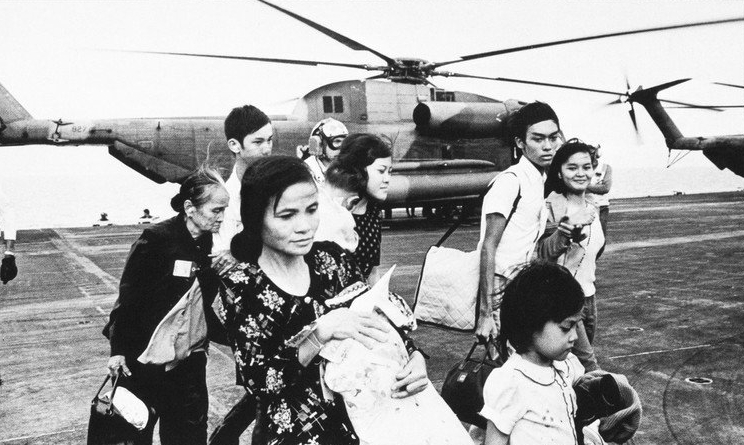
Vietnamese refugees aboard the USS Midway during Operation Frequent Wind

The group's prowess in counter-guerrilla operations was demonstrated by the high level of security in the provinces where it operated. An Giang Province had the highest security rating of any province in South Vietnam, despite being surrounded by areas with security ratings near the bottom of the national list. Long Xuyên, the provincial capital and only 30 miles from the Cambodian border, was a Hòa Hảo stronghold with the Mekong Delta's second-highest security ranking. The region's security prompted American advisors to invite visiting dignitaries to An Giang Province, where the situation was supposedly representative of the remarkable progress made in the war. Despite the brutal guerilla warfare that engulfed the rest of the Mekong Delta, An Giang remained a haven of peace until the very end of the conflict. No ARVN division was ever assigned to conduct full-time combat operations in the province, and its efforts were limited to preventing Communist infiltration routes and camps in neighboring provinces. Moreover, throughout the Mekong Delta, An Giang's territorial forces had the lowest rate of desertions.

In the mid-1970s, president Nguyễn Văn Thiệu, who took power in 1967, started to face domestic opposition. After some street protests, he started to crackdown on any opposition, including the Hòa Hảo militia. Following this, six major Hòa Hảo factions signed a declaration in Hòa Hảo village, calling for an end to all separate activities that were harmful to unity, and formed an opposition to Saigon. They sheltered and protected hundreds of thousands of ARVN draft dodgers and deserters, and organized them into their own army, supplying them with American weaponry obtained from corrupt ARVN commanders. The Hòa Hảo, having created a "Civil Guard Force", became a formidable foe for Thiệu, who declared the dissolution of the Hòa Hảo militia on 30 January 1975. The Thiệu government assaulted the Hòa Hảo for the first time since 1963. They arrested Lê Trung Tuấn, the director of the Hòa Hảo Central Institute, and Trần Hữu Bẩy, the commander of the Bảo An military wing, which was later banned by the government. The men were sent before a Cần Thơ military court, where they were sentenced to six years of hard labor. Government forces had arrested as many as 600 Hoahaoists by February. Clashes erupted in the Mekong Delta; ARVN troops killed seven Hòa Hảo militiamen and wounded sixteen others after surrounding ten thousand Hòa Hảo, including militiamen from the now-banned Bảo An military wing who dug in around a pagoda. Lương Trọng Tường, the Hòa Hảo's leader, and members of the movement's high council were among those besieged. Despite all these, An Giang, the religion's home province, became a government stronghold until the last months of the war.

Before the Fall of Saigon in 1975, at least two Hòa Hảo Regional Force battalions were sent to neighboring Kiên Giang Province, and hundreds of thousands of Hòa Hảo served in ARVN units across the country. Thousands more trained soldiers were stationed in the provinces of An Giang and Châu Đốc. Many of these soldiers joined guerrilla forces on the outskirts of the Hòa Hảo homeland, which was relatively unscathed by war. After the war, there were reports of a major anti-Communist military insurgency in the Mekong Delta, though not much is known due to the country's secretive nature at the time. In November 1977, a government decree specified that religious activities must be consistent with socialism. Individual Hòa Hảo practices were allowed, but no explicit reference to Sổ was permitted, and his written works were outlawed. Vietnamese Communist authorities reported military operations to defeat the remaining forces in January 1978. They were assumed to be Hòa Hảo insurgents by the American media, who numbered in the thousands. Nevertheless, the Hòa Hảo claimed to have three million adherents in 1978. They were marked for special attention in the re-education process by the new government, and many of the movement's leaders were imprisoned. The new government prohibited the religion, but allowed individual practitioners to worship at home. Many Hoahaoists fled to neighboring Cambodia or migrated to the United States to avoid further persecution. Meanwhile, the religious leaders of the Hòa Hảo found various ways to cooperate with local authorities. Some leaders took a rather more political viewpoint and were subjected to harassment. Some leaders refused to discuss politics, and they were left alone in some areas. Some opined about the government's abuses, which caused tension as they were perceived as rebels.

== Present day and persecution ==
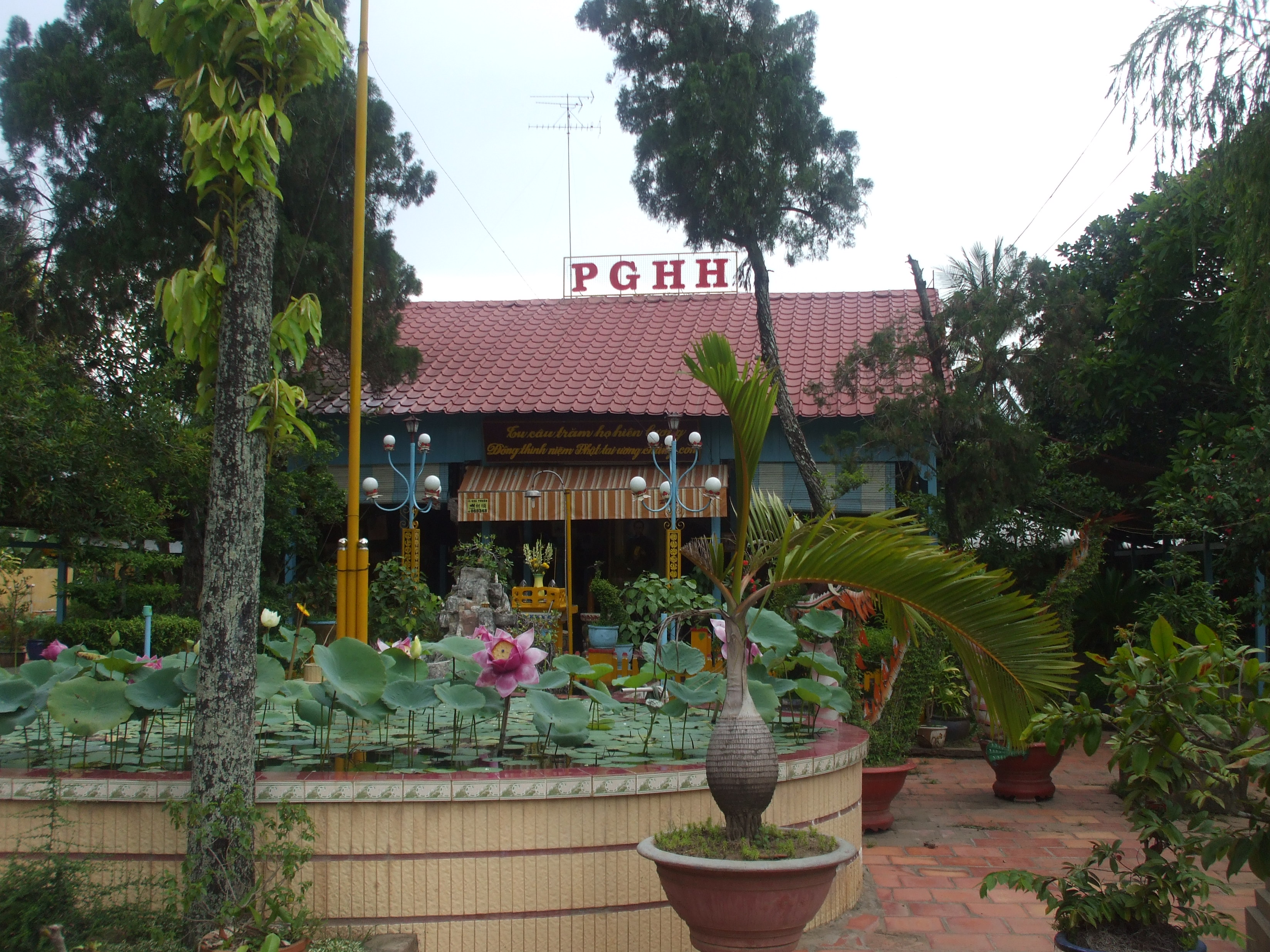
Tổ Đình (Sacred Ancestral Temple of Hoa Hao Buddhism), the Hòa Hảo founding temple in Phú Tân.

The Vietnamese government officially recognized the Hòa Hảo religion in 1999. In July, half a million Hoahaoists gathered in An Giang. Similar religious gatherings of the Hòa Hảo were held in the following years. Despite this, the government imposes harsh controls on dissenting Hòa Hảo groups that do not follow the state-sanctioned branch. Local rights groups have said that authorities in An Giang harass unapproved devotees on a regular basis, prohibit public readings of the Hòa Hảo founder's writings, and discourage worshipers from visiting Hòa Hảo pagodas in An Giang and adjoining provinces. The collective expression of particular Hòa Hảo commemorations, pilgrimage traditions, and freedom of publication is disfavored by the authorities. The Vietnamese Communist Party demonstrated its continuation of political domination by renewed arrests of Hòa Hảo activists. Two Hoahaoists self-immolated in 2005 to protest religious persecution and in May 2007 nine more were imprisoned following a wave of arrests. Unrecognized religious groups, including Hòa Hảo groups, face constant monitoring, harassment, and intimidation, according to a 2020 Human Rights Watch report, and their followers are subjected to public criticism, forced abandonment of faith, arrest, questioning, torture, and incarceration. According to other sources, members of the unregistered Hòa Hảo groups were persecuted on numerous occasions, including the imprisonment of six Hoahaoists who were accused of organizing an anti-government protest.

Hòa Hảo sources state that house arrest was imposed on 67 Hòa Hảo followers as of mid-2019. Individuals resisting police efforts to prevent invitees from attending Hòa Hảo meetings have accounted for the majority of the arrests; the police considered such defiance to be "inciting a disturbance". In October 2019, six members of an unregistered Hòa Hảo group were assaulted by uniformed policemen in An Giang Province while traveling to demonstrate against the planned demolition of a Hòa Hảo temple. The government-recognized Hòa Hảo Buddhist Church had supported the temple's destruction, but its defenders argued that it was still usable and sacred to them. According to the 2019 Annual Report of the United States Commission on International Religious Freedom, the local authorities in the province established barricades and police checkpoints to prevent the adherents of the unrecognized sect from celebrating significant religious holidays, such as the founder's birthday. On 27 November 2019, a Hòa Hảo Buddhist was given an eight-year sentence for critical social media statements about the government, according to An Giang, a Vietnamese newspaper.

=== Branches ===
Hòa Hảo is divided into three branches referred to as 'sects': pure, neutral, and state-recognized, though all of the sects follow identical practices. A small number of Hoahaoists choose not to be a member of an established sect. According to Hòa Hảo sources, the state-recognized and pure sects have fewer than 400 adherents, while the others are the members of the neutral sect. Adherents of the pure sect are completely committed to the doctrines of Sổ; one of their core ideals is opposing the "dictatorship" and they intend to fight to reclaim their "lawful interest", whereas the adherents of the neutral sect are in line with the pure sect but don't want to have any problems with the authorities. Vietnamese Communist Party's members lead the state-recognized sect. According to The Vietnamese, formed by Vietnamese activists and reporters, the pure sect is an unrecognized religious organization, and its members are not permitted to hold their worshiping ceremonies publicly because just the organization's Central Executive Committee has the authority to arrange such events.

== Beliefs ==
=== Doctrine ===
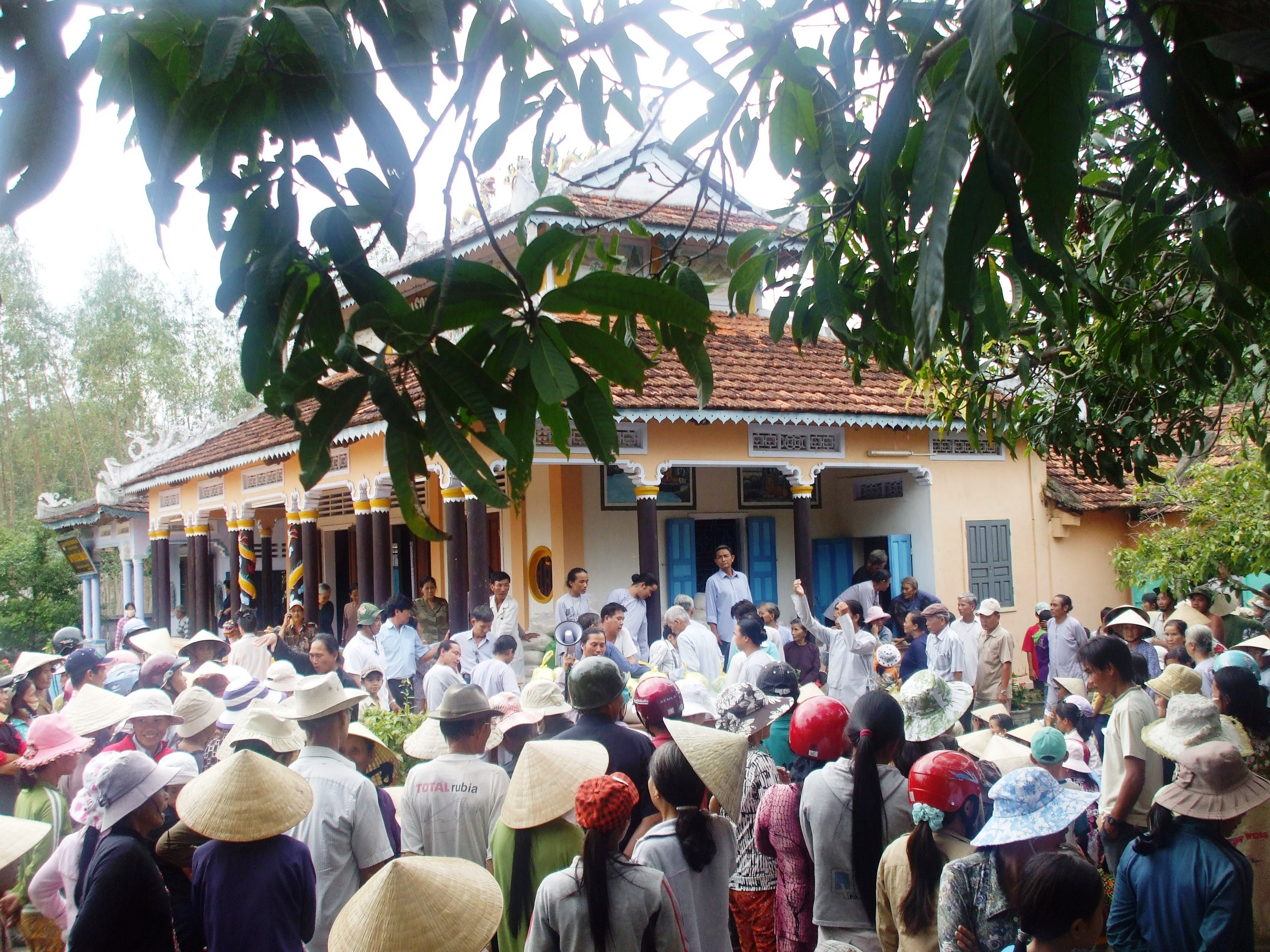
Hòa Hảo followers distributing relief goods to the poor affected by a natural disaster, 2009

Hòa Hảo's spiritual doctrine is essentially Buddhist. It has been labelled as an example of Buddhist protestantism; an amalgam of Buddhism, ancestor worship, animistic rites, and elements of Confucian doctrine, transformed and adapted to the mores and customs of the peasants of the Mekong Delta. It was also influenced by millennial aspects of Khmer Buddhism.

Between 1940 and 1946, Sổ authored a series of booklets that outlined the doctrinal elements of pre-sectarian Buddhism and its application to peasant culture at the time. His main written texts were first compiled in book form in 1948, following his death. Sổ had emphasized that his intention was to return to the original teachings of the Bửu Sơn Kỳ Hương doctrine. He was criticized for harking back to the past, though most of the criticism came from Westernized intellectuals who questioned the relevance of traditional values to contemporary concerns, dismissed most sectarian practices as superstition, and insisted that religion had no place in politics. The doctrine's revision was forced upon him as a response to particular critiques, rather than being the outcome of his own reasoned reconsideration. As a result, this revision was as disorganized as the critical attacks. Therefore, Hòa Hảo thought isn't a well-considered revision of an out-of-date set of ideas. The religious and secular aspects of Hòa Hảo philosophy are inextricably linked. Spiritual values have secular ramifications, and religious solutions are frequently suggested to what would be considered social and political concerns.

Sổ, who is referred to as the "Virtuous Master" or "Grand Master" by his followers, railed against Vietnam's social evils, prohibiting the sale of child brides, matchmaking, gambling, and the use of alcohol and opium. He depicted money as a source of evil for both those who lacked it and those who possessed too much, emphasizing thrift and hard labor to the poor, while stressing the soteriological value of charity to the rich. Sổ was against profit and competition, believing in the concept of a fair price and the immorality of usury. The urban life, according to Sổ, was a place of relentless competitiveness and ostentatious consumption. His anti-urban sentiments sprang not only from his beliefs in the intrinsic evil of big cities, but also from his recognition that they provided an escape for individuals seeking to avoid the stresses of communal life. The majority of modern problems were credited to Western civilization, which manifested itself in the urban lifestyle. People's notion of community was said to have been disrupted by urban living. City inhabitants were accused of dishonesty, oversophistication, and an obsession with material values and appearances. Sổ regarded urbanization and industrialization as the result of the colonial conquest and thus something that could be reversed with the end of colonial rule. Despite a platform that advocated for equal treatment and the abolition of special privileges, he was a staunch opponent of Marxism and class conflict. In fact, the Hòa Hảo levied high taxes on their converts to cover welfare payments and military protection.

Similar to the Chinese White Lotus tradition, the Hòa Hảo eschatology adopts a division of three great eras (tam nguyên): establishment (chánh pháp), apogee (tượng pháp), and destruction of the dharma (mạt pháp). The closer humanity gets to the conclusion of the 'base era' (hạ ngươn), the more disasters it will face, finally leading to the 'end of the world' (tận thế). Then a new 'high era' (thượng ngươn) will emerge, distinguished by absolute moral regeneration and sincere faith. If the faithful follow the declared ethic, they can expect to take part in a great assembly where they will be judged on their own merits. Maitreya will preside over this 'Assembly of the Dragon Flower' (hội Long Hoa), in which he will reach the pinnacle of his enlightenment, ushering in a new era of rejuvenation.

Sổ sought to unify and refine a Mahāyāna Buddhist practice that honors ancestor commemoration and is appropriate for peasant life. He attempted to develop a subtle criticism of Bửu Sơn Kỳ Hương's eschatological elements, which had never been done before. Sổ's desire to break the prophetic and messianic cycle, on the other hand, was never fully defined or fulfilled. His mysterious death even reawakened hope for a second coming and paved the way to claims of reincarnation in various forms.

=== Practices ===
Unlike orthodox Buddhism, Hòa Hảo eschews elaborate rituals, temples, maintains no monastic order, and teaches home practice, though it has a few monks. Sổ advocated that each devotee could have direct communion with the Buddha, and that inner faith was more important than external rites. The faith requires no expensive statues or instruments as the faith believes that a deceased believer who lived a "correct" life just needs a simple funeral to expedite him to the afterlife. Such precepts were critical in lowering the cost of religion for the peasantry. It has earned the descriptor "poor man's Buddhism" because of its outward simplicity. Hòa Hảo temples are often a simple stucco structure with a thatched roof. Religious adornments are similarly simple.

The most important altar for the Hòa Hảo is erected outside the residence, in front of which ritual prostrations are performed. The bàn thông thiên (lit. 'Heaven's altar') is the signature object and site of the Hòa Hảo tradition. It consists of a basic wooden tablet measuring 40 by 40 centimeters (16 in), which is supported by a 130-centimeter (51 in) high column on which offerings are laid. It represents deprivation and mortality, and the follower's humility, as followers pray with their feet firmly planted on the ground, sometimes even kneeling, in direct communion with heaven.

The training of lay religious professionals started in the 1950s, when Hòa Hảo's first explanatory works were published. In the 1960s study centers began to proliferate and an elite was fully trained to instruct the populace. State recognition allowed the group to expand its social and charitable activities, as well as publish works, republish and translate Sổ's writings, print portraits of Sổ that became objects of worship, build libraries, and establish educational centers. The độc giảng đường were built, which were roadside edifices that allowed peasants working in the fields to listen to amplified public readings of sacred scriptures.

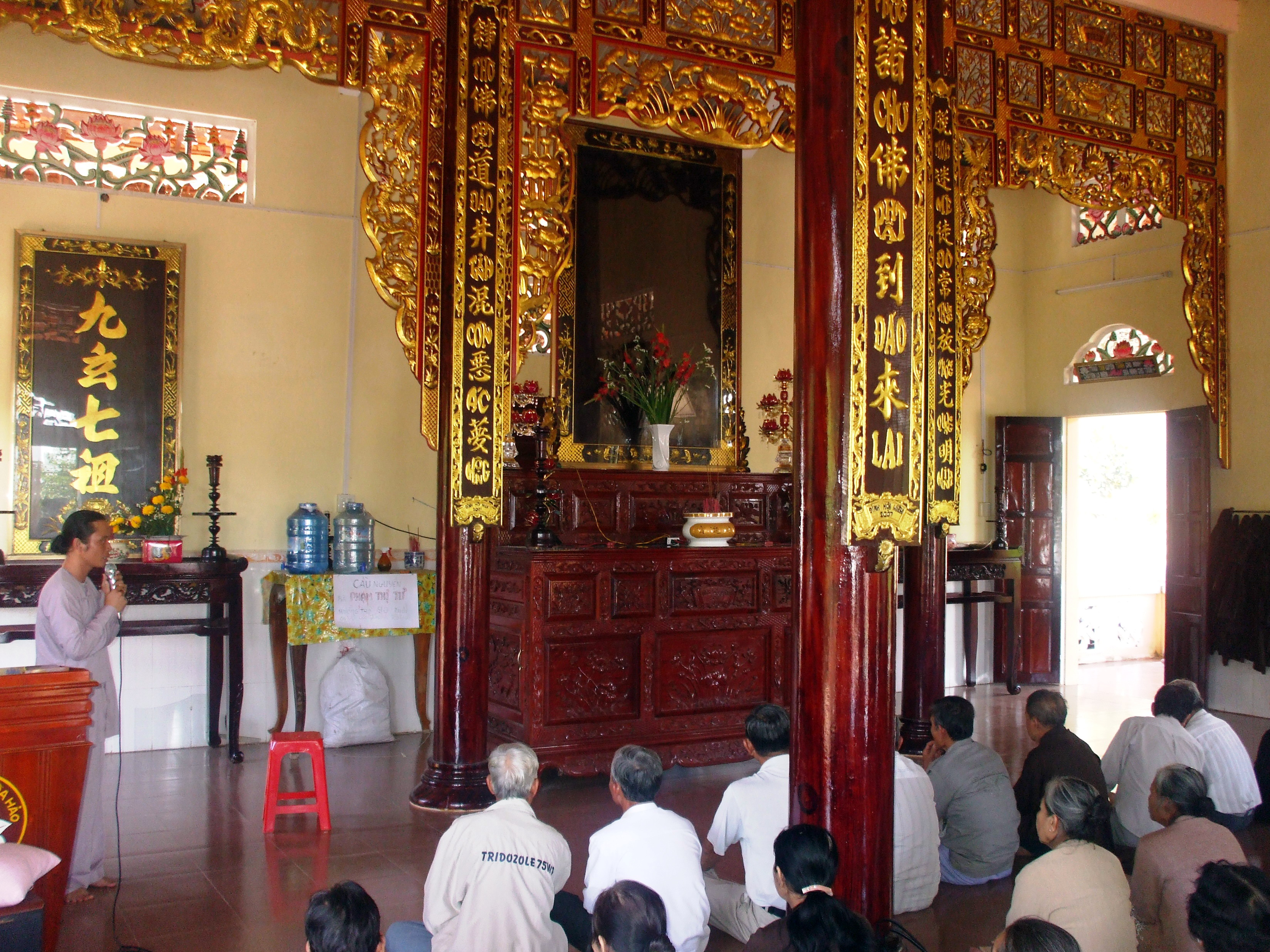
A Hòa Hảo ceremony in 2009

As a show of universal understanding, prayers are said in front of an empty table covered in red cloth. Water as a sign of cleanliness, local flowers as a sign of purity, and a small amount of incense to ward off evil spirits are the only physical offerings. Regular Hòa Hảo rites are limited to four prayers a day: the first to Buddha, the second to the "Reign of the Enlightened King", which is influenced by Western Messianic thought, and the third to living and deceased parents and relatives. The fourth prayer is dedicated to those whom the devotee wishes to have the "will to improve themselves, to be charitable, and to be free of the chains of ignorance". According to Hòa Hảo philosophy, devotees are to maintain the Three Fundamental Bonds: the relationship between the ruler and the subject, the relationship between father and son, and the relationship between husband and wife. The Five Constant Virtues of benevolence, righteousness, propriety, wisdom, and trustworthiness are to be observed. They are to live in harmony with one another above everything else.

Hoahaoists began giving community amenities, such as free food, shelter, clothes, medicinal herbs, and rural transportation infrastructure, when the government recognized the religion, according to Thanh Vo-Duy. For the Hòa Hảo, establishing new villages was a meritorious act; in the early 1970s, Hoahaoists were actively creating new villages out of the wetlands in the Plain of Reeds. Despite this, Vietnamese people outside the Mekong Delta know little about Hòa Hảo religious life.

Early in the religion's history, Sổ's apocalyptic rhetoric had severe repercussions. Several incidents of human sacrifice by Hòa Hảo adepts were documented; these ritual killings were justified on religious grounds, with some believing that the spirits were thirsty for human blood. Although human sacrifice was not unknown in Vietnam prior to the Hòa Hảo, historian Hue-Tam Tai argues that Sổ's frightening predictions had a role in the increased frequency of such incidents in the 1940s.

Historically, Vietnamese sectarian preachers were expected to perform magical and healing acts, but Hòa Hảo writers believed that magic was superstition, and hence incompatible with Zen's non-exertion spirit. Traditionally, a missionary had to demonstrate his special abilities before his preaching could be accepted, which necessitated the use of magic. Tai believes that the emphasis stems from the illiteracy of the Mekong Delta's population. She contrasts this with Chinese sects, which used the written word more frequently, but their adherents were also more settled within their communities. The lack of religious literature and the concentration on magical proof encouraged a style of leadership based on personal charisma rather than inherited legitimacy.

Its adherents have their own flag, a brown rectangle with no characters or pictures. The Hòa Hảo insignia is circular and brown, with a white lotus in the center and the initials P.G.H.H. (Phật Giáo Hòa Hảo) on top. They also have their own special holidays; the Hoahaoists celebrate three festival days each Vietnamese lunisolar year: 18th day of the 5th month, the anniversary of the founding of Hòa Hảo Buddhism; 25th day of the 11th month, the founder's nativity; and 25th day of the 2nd month, the date of the founder's "disappearance".

To become a follower, a candidate must introduce oneself to the village management committee with the assistance of two confirmed devotees who are familiar with the religious precepts and moral restrictions. The convert returns home after being publicly accepted to tell their family that they have taken shelter alongside the Three Jewels of Buddhism and are praying before the ancestors' altar, and then a copy of Sổ's work Cách tu hiền và sự ăn ở của một người bổn đạo is given to the convert. If no management committee exists, the convert is led by two adherents until they can visit the nearest committee. Anyone who wishes to leave the community must inform two followers or the committee of their decision. Anyone who goes against Sổ's teachings is expelled from the community, and they are solely responsible for their actions. The village management boards fell under the jurisdiction of an interprovincial board and, ultimately, a central management board, which was in charge of Buddhist education and the application of the conditions of admittance into the faith, beginning in the late 1940s. However, because it was controlled by military factions, historian Pascal Bourdeaux argues that it lacked genuine representativeness.

== Demographics ==
Map of the Mekong Delta within Vietnam

According to a 2019 study by the UK Home Office's fact-finding mission in Vietnam, Hòa Hảo is the country's fourth largest religion. According to the United States Department of State's 2019 International Religious Freedom Report, Vietnam's total population was 97.9 million, based on estimates from the US government; Vietnam's government statistics from January 2018 found that the Hoahaoists made about 1.5% of the Vietnamese population. Official estimates put the number of Hoahaoists at 1.3 million, although "unofficial" estimates put it at more than 2 million. Other sources estimate 500,000–1 million, 4–5 million or 8 million Hòa Hảo followers.

During its inception, the religion's appeal was primarily to the poor peasantry of the Mekong Delta. The religion is still exclusively concentrated in the region, especially in the An Giang Province districts of Chợ Mới and Phú Tân, and the cities of Châu Đốc and Long Xuyên, as well as the surrounding provinces of Kiên Giang, Vĩnh Long, Đồng Tháp and Cần Thơ. In addition, Hòa Hảo devotees can be found in Hồ Chí Minh City, primarily because of the migration of adherents rather than the religion's spread among the urban population. Unregistered Hoahaoists often reside in remote areas that are difficult to access. As a result, understanding how the communities interact each other, or whether they are connected by a communication network, is difficult. Hòa Hảo adherents are "very few" in central Vietnam and there are almost no adherents in northern Vietnam.

Overseas communities began to form around the late 1970s, mainly in the United States, Australia, and Canada, as well as smaller groups in France, Germany, and Belgium. It is estimated that there are several tens of thousands of Hòa Hảo followers living abroad. The largest community of Hoahaoists abroad is in Santa Ana, California.
