= Lam Thanh Nguyen =

Vietnamese military leader

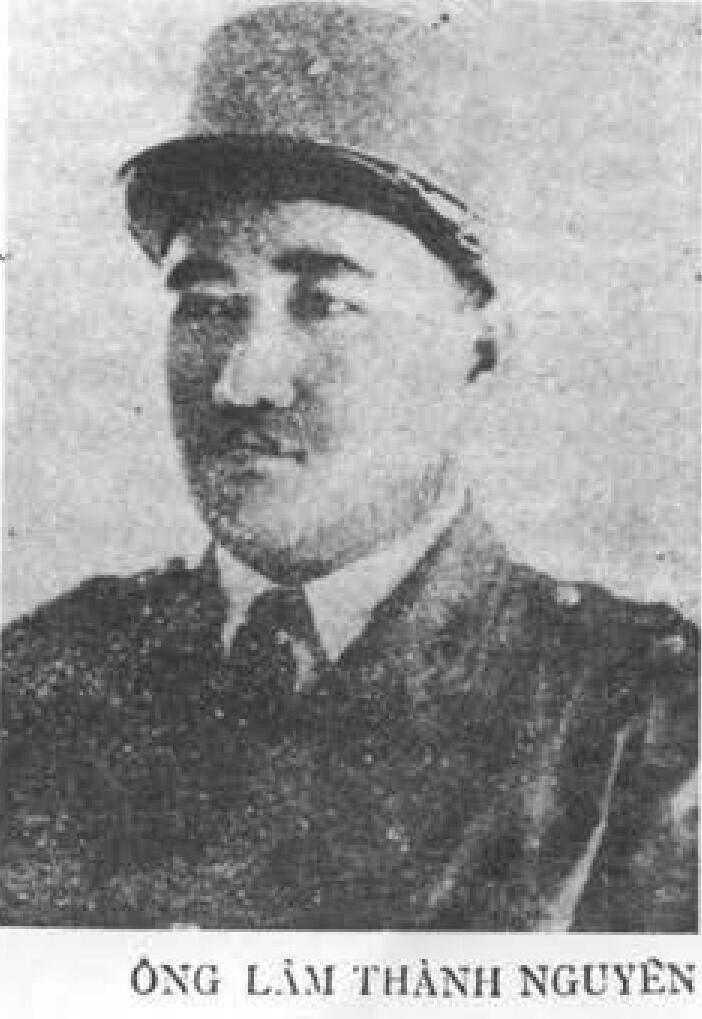
- Native name: Lâm Thành Nguyên
- Nickname: Hai Ngoán
- Born: 1904; Cần Thơ, French Indochina
- Died: 1977 (aged 72–73) Chí Hòa Prison, Hồ Chí Minh City, Vietnam
- Allegiance: Hòa Hảo/ South Vietnam
- Service years: 1940–1955
- Rank: Lieutenant General
- Commands: Hòa Hảo armed forces
- Conflicts: World War II; First Indochina War; Vietnam War

Lam Thanh Nguyen (Vietnamese: Lâm Thành Nguyên; 1904–1977), also known as Hai Ngoán, was a Vietnamese military leader, lieutenant general of the Vietnamese National Army and the deputy commander-in-chief of the armed forces of the Hòa Hảo. Receiving French military education, he was a native of Nhơn Nghĩa village in Cần Thơ.

== Life ==
=== Early years ===
Lâm Thành Nguyên was born in the Nhơn Nghĩa village of Cần Thơ in 1904. His family sent him to learn literature and martial arts from a young age, as he came from a family of prominent landowners in the Bảy Núi region. Nguyên's father was of Ch'ao-chou ancestry, and his mother was half-Chinese. Huỳnh Phú Sổ, the founder of the Hòa Hảo, cured Nguyên's aunt of an illness during his visit, and Nguyên became one of his adepts. He ascended through the ranks of a Hòa Hảo regiment within only five years. Sometime during World War II, Nguyên was arrested by the French colonial authorities on charges of blackmail. Nguyên returned to the Mekong Delta after being released in 1945 and immediately began forming new armed units; he also became a healer, calling himself the dao Ngoan.

=== Military leadership ===
On 7–9 September 1945, a band of 15,000 Hoahaoists armed with hand-to-hand weapons, and aided by the Trotskyists, attacked the Việt Minh garrison at the port city of Cần Thơ, which the Hòa Hảo considered the rightful capital of their domain. They were led by Thành Nguyên, General Trần Văn Soái, his eldest son, and Sổ's younger brother, but with their antiquated weapons, the Hòa Hảo were defeated and Sổ's men were massacred by the Việt Minh-controlled Advanced Guard Youth, who were reportedly aided by a nearby Japanese garrison. The slaughter was characterized by its savagery. During the clash, the Communists captured Nguyên. He was rescued by a passing sampan after being thrown alive into the Bassac River with his hands tied behind his back. Nguyên later profited from the incident, saying that he was saved by divine intervention. Extortion was used by Soái and Thành Nguyên to boost the sect's finances. There were also a lot of forced conversions, which swelled the Hòa Hảo ranks. Thành Nguyên's territorial ambitions entangled him in conflicts with both the French and Soái, forcing him to retreat to Tu Te and eventually Bảy Núi before the end of 1946.

Thành Nguyên, along with other Hòa Hảo generals declared war on South Vietnam in late May 1955, furious that they had not granted the Hòa Hảo enough privileges. They knew that a direct confrontation with the Vietnamese National Army (VNA) would be catastrophic, so they burned down to their bases and dispersed their army of 16,000 men into the jungle to operate as guerrillas. The VNA, led by the General Dương Văn Minh (1916–2001), went on an offensive on 5 June and by mid-June, the army crushed Soái's forces near the Cambodian border, forcing him to retreat into Cambodia. Thành Nguyên, along with Nguyễn Giác Ngộ were disappointed by the rebellion's ineffectiveness, and they surrendered and turned over their armies to Saigon.

== Sources ==
- Fall, Bernard (1963). The Two Viet-Nams: A Political and Military Analysis. New York: Praeger Publishers. ISBN 0999141791.
- G. Marr, David (2013). Vietnam: State, War, and Revolution (1945–1946). Berkeley, California: University of California Press. ISBN 978-0520274150.
- Fall, Bernard B. (September 1955). "The Political-Religious Sects of Viet-Nam". Pacific Affairs. 28 (3): 235–253. doi:10.2307/3035404. JSTOR 3035404.
- T. Jr McAlister, John (1969). Vietnam, The Origins of Revolution. New York: Alfred A. Knopf for the Center of International Studies, Prince University. LCCN 69010690.
- Tai, Hue-Tam Ho (2013) [1983]. Millenarianism and Peasant Politics in Vietnam. Harvard University Press. ISBN 978-0674433694.
- Jacobs, Seth (2004). America's Miracle Man in Vietnam: Ngo Dinh Diem, Religion, Race, and U.S. Intervention in Southeast Asia (Second ed.). Duke University Press. ISBN 0822334291. ISSN 2692-0514.
- Moyar, Mark (2009). Triumph Forsaken: The Vietnam War, 1954–1965. Cambridge University Press. ISBN 978-0521757638.
- Thi Lâm, Quang (2001). The Twenty-five Year Century: A South Vietnamese General Remembers the Indochina War to the Fall of Saigon. University of North Texas Press. ISBN 1574411438.
- Currey, Cech B. (2011) [1998]. "Dewey, Albert Peter". In Tucker, Spencer C. (ed.). Encyclopedia of the Vietnam War (Second ed.). ABC-Clio. ISBN 978-1851099603.
- Thống, Trần Ngọc; Huân, Hồ Đắc; Thụy, Lê Đình (2011). Lược sử Quân lực Việt Nam Cộng hòa (in Vietnamese).
