= Ba Cụt =

Vietnamese military leader (c. 1923–1956)

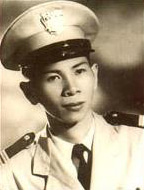
- Born: Lê Quang Vinh c. 1923; Long Xuyên, Cochinchina, French Indochina
- Died: 13 July 1956 (aged c. 33) Cần Thơ, South Vietnam
- Allegiance: Hòa Hảo, which frequently made short-term alliances with many other Vietnamese groups
- Service years: 1943/44–1956
- Rank: Brigadier general
- Commands: Commander of the military forces of the Hòa Hảo religious sect
- Spouse: Trần Thị Hoa (m. 1946)

Lê Quang Vinh (c. 1923 – 13 July 1956), popularly known as Ba Cụt (Vietnamese: [ɓāː kût]), was a Vietnamese military commander of the Hòa Hảo religious sect, which operated from the Mekong Delta and controlled various parts of southern Vietnam during the 1940s and early 1950s.

Ba Cụt and his forces fought the Vietnamese National Army (VNA), the Việt Minh, and the Cao Đài religious movement from 1943 until his capture in 1956. Known for his idiosyncrasies, he was regarded as an erratic and cruel leader who fought with little ideological purpose. His sobriquet came from the self-amputation of his left index finger (although it was erroneously reported that it was his middle or "third cut finger"). He later swore not to cut his hair until the communist Việt Minh were defeated. Ba Cụt frequently made alliances with various Vietnamese factions and the French. He invariably accepted the material support offered in return for his cooperation, and then broke the agreement—nevertheless, the French made deals with him on five occasions. The French position was weak because their military forces had been depleted by World War II, and they had great difficulty in re-establishing control over French Indochina, which had been left with a power vacuum after the defeat of Japan.

In mid-1955, the tide turned against the various sects, as Prime Minister Ngô Đình Diệm of the State of Vietnam and his VNA began to consolidate their grip on the south. Ba Cụt and his allies were driven into the jungle, and their position was threatened by government offensives. After almost a year of fighting, Ba Cụt was captured. He was sentenced to death and publicly beheaded in Cần Thơ.

== Early life and background ==
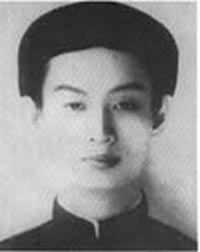
Huỳnh Phú Sổ, the leader of the Hòa Hảo

Ba Cụt was born circa 1923 in Long Xuyên, a regional town in the Mekong Delta, in the far south of Vietnam. He was orphaned at an early age and adopted by a local peasant family. Ba Cụt was illiterate and was known from childhood as a temperamental and fiery person. The family's rice paddy field were confiscated by a prominent landlord, the father of Nguyễn Ngọc Thơ. This caused a lifelong and fanatical hatred towards landowners. Thơ rose to become a leading politician in the 1950s and played a key role in Ba Cụt's eventual capture and execution. An aura of mystery surrounded Ba Cụt during his life, and foreign journalists incorrectly reported that he had severed his finger as part of a vow to defeat the French. As Ba Cụt became more fanatical in his religious beliefs and spent increasing time with local holy men, his father demanded that he work more in the family's rice fields. A defiant Ba Cụt severed his index finger, which was necessary for work in the rice paddies.

Vietnam was a tumultuous place during Ba Cụt's youth, particularly in the Mekong Delta. In 1939, Huỳnh Phú Sổ founded the Hòa Hảo religious movement, and within a year had gained more than 100,000 followers. He drew adherents for two reasons: the prophecies he made about the outbreak of World War II and the conquest of South-East Asia by Japan, which proved to be correct; and his work as a mystical healer—his patients claimed to have been miraculously cured from all manner of serious illnesses after seeing him, when Western medicine had failed. Sổ's cult-like appeal greatly alarmed the French colonial authorities. During World War II, Imperial Japan invaded and seized control of Vietnam from France; its defeat and withdrawal at the end of the war in 1945 left a power vacuum in the country.

The Hòa Hảo formed their own army and administration during the war, and started a de facto state in their Mekong Delta stronghold. They came into conflict with the Cao Đài, another new religious movement, which also boasted a private army and controlled a nearby region of southern Vietnam around Tây Ninh. Meanwhile, in Saigon, the Bình Xuyên organised crime syndicate ruled much of the city through its gangster militia. These three southern forces vied for control of southern Vietnam with the main protagonists: the French, who were attempting to re-establish colonial control across the entire nation; and the communist-dominated Việt Minh, who sought Vietnamese independence.

The Hòa Hảo initially engaged in large-scale clashes with the Việt Minh in 1945, but by mid-1946 the two groups had agreed to stop fighting each other and fight the French instead. However, in June 1946, Sổ became estranged from his military leaders and started the Dân Xã (Social Democratic Party). Because of his charisma, the Việt Minh saw Sổ as a threat and assassinated him, leaving the Hòa Hảo leaderless and causing Sổ's military leaders to go their separate ways. The split caused an increase in violence as the various Hòa Hảo factions engaged in conflicts among themselves.

At the time, the many groups vying for power—including their respective factions—engaged in alliances of convenience that were frequently broken. Historian David Elliott wrote: "[T]he most important eventual cause of the French decline was the inherently unstable nature of the political alliances they had devised ... [T]he history of the French relations with the Hoa Hao sect is a telling illustration of the pitfalls of short-term political deals between forces whose long-term interests conflict."

== Career ==
Ba Cụt joined the Hòa Hảo militia when it was formed in 1943–44, and became a commander within a year. He was feared by his enemies, and was described as "a sort of lean Rasputin" who claimed to be immortal. According to historian and writer Bernard Fall, "the hapless farmers who were under the rule of the maniacal Ba Cut fared worse [than those under other military leaders], for the latter [Ba Cụt] was given to fits of incredible cruelty and had no sense of public duty." American journalist Joseph Alsop described Ba Cụt as "war-drunk". Ba Cụt was famous for inventing a torture contraption that drilled a steel nail through the victim's ear, a device he used to extort villagers and wealthy landlords to fund his forces. He was said to have arranged "temporary marriages" of his men with village girls. Ba Cụt raised a large amount of funds for the Hòa Hảo and himself personally by charging traders and landlords high prices to stop pirates in the local area. The severed heads of the pirates were subsequently impaled on stakes and put on public display.

In 1947, he led his own faction of the sect after its various military leaders pursued their own policies towards the French and Hồ Chí Minh's Việt Minh in the wake of Sổ's death. At the time, France was in a ruinous financial state following World War II and was experiencing great difficulty in its attempts to re-establish control over its colonies. Ba Cụt had only 1,000 men in five battalions at the time, fewer than 5% of Hòa Hảo forces, whereas Trần Văn Soái had 15,000 men. The French tried to maintain their hold with a divide and conquer strategy towards the Hòa Hảo. They coaxed Soái into joining with them and recognised him as the leader of the Hòa Hảo. In 1948, Ba Cụt rallied to the French and Soái, but broke away again soon after, relocating to Đồng Tháp Province and resuming his military activities against the French.

In 1950, Ba Cụt was involved in a battle with another Hòa Hảo leader, Nguyễn Giác Ngộ. He was defeated and driven from the district of Chợ Mới in February, provoking Soái to attack Ngo. Ba Cụt then moved to Thốt Nốt and began attacking the civilians and the French forces there. The French saw the disagreements as an opportunity to divide the Hòa Hảo and gain an anti-Việt Minh ally, and offered material aid, which Ba Cụt accepted. Ba Cụt repeatedly made treaties with the French colonial forces to fight the Việt Minh in return for arms and money, but he broke his end of the bargain and sometimes fought the Cao Đài instead of the communists. He made five such deals with the French, but he abandoned his military responsibilities each time. It was said that Ba Cụt sometimes broke away with the encouragement of Soái, who was still allied to the French, but nevertheless is believed to have given Ba Cụt weapons to fight the French. The French continued to furnish him with supplies despite his disloyalty and unreliability because they lacked the personnel to patrol all of Vietnam but had spare equipment. Some historians have claimed Ba Cụt's anti-French activities were not taken seriously as he was able to pass through French checkpoints without incident. There are also reports that he was accompanied by French intelligence agents during periods when he was nominally opposed to the French. The other Hòa Hảo commanders generally had the same general outlook as Ba Cụt; they were stridently opposed to the Việt Minh due to Sổ's assassination, and sometimes fought alongside and received supplies from the French, but at times they lapsed into apathy and refused to attack.

The most notable instance of Ba Cụt's abandoning the fight against the Việt Minh came in mid-1953. At that time, his forces had been helping to defend the regional Mekong Delta town of Mỹ Tho, but the French decided to transfer more of the military power to their more mainstream allies, the Vietnamese National Army (VNA). As the French tried to undermine his position, tensions with Ba Cụt increased. On 25 June, the Hòa Hảo leader ordered his men to evacuate their French-supplied bases; they took their weapons with them and razed the camps. Ba Cụt then withdrew his forces from a string of military posts in the Plain of Reeds and retreated to Châu Đốc in the extreme south of the country. As a result, the French-aligned presence in the Mekong Delta was severely dented and the Việt Minh made substantial gains in the area. Eventually, the French defeat at Điện Biên Phủ in May 1954 signaled the end of French Indochina.

When the Geneva Conference in July 1954 ended the First Indochina War, it handed North Vietnam to Hồ Chí Minh's Việt Minh, and the south to the State of Vietnam. To reunify the country, national elections were scheduled for 1956, following which the French would withdraw from Indochina. The partition of Vietnam angered Ba Cụt and he vowed not to cut his hair until the nation was reunified. Having fought against the Việt Minh since 1947, Ba Cụt's principal criticism of Prime Minister Ngô Đình Diệm's State of Vietnam government stemmed from his belief that Diệm had been too passive in rejecting the partition, and that half of the country should not have been yielded to the communists.

In mid-1954, General Nguyễn Văn Hinh, the head of the State of Vietnam's VNA, announced that he did not respect the leadership of Prime Minister Diệm, and vowed to overthrow him. The coup never materialised and Hinh was forced into exile, but not before appointing Ba Cụt to the rank of colonel in the VNA in an attempt to undermine Diệm, as the Hòa Hảo warlord was openly contemptuous of the prime minister. In August, Ba Cụt and his 3,000 men broke from the VNA and left their Thốt Nốt base for the jungle, and fought against those who had briefly been their comrades; this put him at odds with most Hòa Hảo leaders, who accepted government payments to integrate their forces into the VNA. Operation Ecaille, the initial military offensive by the VNA against Ba Cụt was a failure, possibly because the details of the planned attack on his forces were leaked to him by Soái, a Hòa Hảo member of the National Defense Committee.

During the transition period between the signing of the Geneva Accords and the planned reunification elections, South Vietnam remained in chaos as the VNA tried to subdue the remaining autonomous factions of the Hòa Hảo, Cao Đài, and Bình Xuyên militias. In early 1955, during a battle with the Cao Đài forces of Trình Minh Thế, after a dispute over control of the That Son region, Ba Cụt was wounded in a disputed incident. Thế claimed to have tried initiating peace talks with Ba Cụt, but received no reply, so he decided to try to capture his rival. He sent some of his militant disciples to infiltrate Ba Cụt's forces and try to capture the Hòa Hảo leader. When they located Ba Cụt and surrounded him, he refused to surrender but instead tried to shoot his way out. Ba Cụt was severely wounded by a bullet that penetrated his chest. It seemed that he would die, but a French Air Force helicopter flew in and airlifted him to a colonial hospital. He recovered and in the interim the fighting stopped. Another account claims the two military leaders had been on good terms and exchanging diplomatic missions, but that the skirmish was caused by one of Ba Cụt's aides addressing the envoy in an abrasive and rude manner, and that the injuries were minor. Yet another account holds that the reaction by Thế's envoy was premeditated and that the claim the firing was in response to rudeness was merely a cover for an assassination attempt. According to this theory, Thế, whose units were then being integrated into Diệm's VNA, had given orders to target Ba Cụt. This was allegedly done on the orders of CIA agent Edward Lansdale, who was trying to help secure Diệm in power at the time. Lansdale has been accused of failing in an earlier attempt to bribe Ba Cụt to cease his activities.

By this time, with France preparing to withdraw from Indochina, senior French officers had begun to undermine Diệm's leadership and his attempts to stabilise South Vietnam. The VNA later implicated the French in the organisation of weapons air drops to Ba Cụt, prompting a protest from Diệm's government. Diệm complained to a French general, alleging that Ba Cụt's men were using French equipment that was of higher quality than that given to the VNA. The Hòa Hảo accused Diệm of treachery in his negotiations with various groups. They charged the prime minister with integrating Thế's forces into the VNA in return for them being allowed to attack Ba Cụt with the aid of the VNA, and that this part of the deal had been kept secret. They warned that other Hòa Hảo leaders who had stopped fighting could join Ba Cụt, and appealed to Diệm's U.S. sponsors. In response, Ba Cụt ambushed a VNA unit in Long Mỹ, killing three officers and injuring some thirty men.

== War with Diệm ==
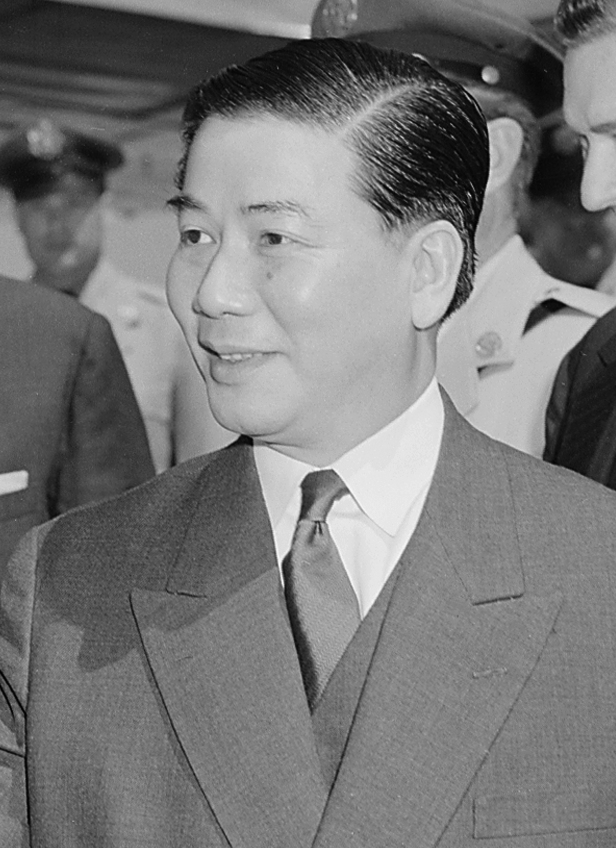
Ngô Đình Diệm, the Prime Minister of the State of Vietnam

In 1955, Diệm tried to integrate the remaining Hòa Hảo armies into the VNA. Ba Cụt was one of four Hòa Hảo military leaders who refused the government offer on 23 April, and continued to operate autonomously. At one stage, the Cao Đài, Hòa Hảo and Bình Xuyên formed an alliance called the United Front, in an attempt to pressure Diệm into handing over power; Ba Cụt was named senior military commander. However, this had little meaning as the various units were still autonomous of each other, and the United Front was more a showpiece than a means of facilitating coordinated action, and did not in any way strengthen any military threat to Diệm. The leaders were suspicious of one another and often sent subordinates to meetings. Initially, American and French representatives in Vietnam hoped that Diệm would take up a ceremonial role and allow the sect leaders—including Ba Cụt—to hold government positions. However, Diệm refused to share power and launched a sudden offensive against Ba Cụt in Thốt Nốt on 12 March, shelling the area heavily. The battle was inconclusive and both sides blamed the other for causing instability and disrupting the situation. Diệm then attacked the Bình Xuyên's Saigon headquarters in late April, quickly crushing them.

During the fighting, the Hòa Hảo attempted to help the Bình Xuyên by attacking towns and government forces in their Mekong Delta heartland. Ba Cụt's men, who had also been angered by the recent arrest of some colleagues, blockaded the Mekong and Bassac rivers and laid siege to various towns, including Sa Đéc, Long Xuyên and Châu Đốc, stifling the regional economy. The Hòa Hảo shut down several important regional roads and stopped the flow of agricultural produce from the nation's most fertile region into the capital, causing food prices to rise by 50%, as meat and vegetables became scarce. Ba Cụt then attacked a battalion of VNA troops south of Sa Đéc. Soon after, they retreated to a Hòa Hảo citadel on the banks of the Bassac. After reinforcing their base, the Hòa Hảo proceeded to fire mortars across the water into the city of Cần Thơ, which stood on the opposite side of the river. During this period, the United Front publicly accused Diệm of trying to bribe Ba Cụt with 100 million piasters, to which the Hòa Hảo responded with a series of attack on outposts and blasts to destroy bridges.

With the Bình Xuyên vanquished, Diệm turned his attention to conquering the Hòa Hảo. As a result, a battle between government troops led by General Dương Văn Minh and Ba Cụt's men commenced in Cần Thơ on 5 June. Five Hòa Hảo battalions surrendered immediately; Ba Cụt and three remaining leaders had fled to the Cambodian border by the end of the month. Having surrendered his forces, Ngo excoriated Soai and Ba Cụt, claiming that their activities were not consistent with Hòa Hảo religious practices and accused them of fighting with communists. The soldiers of the three other leaders eventually surrendered, but Ba Cụt's men continued to the end, claiming loyalty to the Emperor Bảo Đại. Diệm responded by replacing the officers of Bảo Đại's personal regiments with his own men and used the royal units to attack Ba Cụt's rebels near Hà Tiên and Rạch Giá, outnumbering the Hòa Hảo by at least a factor of five. Knowing that they could not defeat the government in open conventional warfare, Ba Cụt's forces destroyed their own bases so that the VNA could not use their abandoned resources, and retreated into the jungle. Ba Cụt's 3,000 men spent the rest of 1955 evading 20,000 VNA troops who had been deployed to quell them, notwithstanding a bounty of one million piasters was put on the head of Ba Cụt, who scattered trails of money in the jungle, hoping to distract his pursuers, but to no avail. The communists claimed in a history written decades later that Ba Cụt had tried to forge an alliance with them, but that talks broke down a few months later.

Despite his weak military situation, Ba Cụt sought to disrupt the staging of a fraudulent referendum that Diệm had scheduled to depose Bảo Đại as head of state. Ba Cụt distributed a pamphlet condemning Diệm as an American puppet, asserting that the prime minister was going to "Catholicize" the country; the referendum was partly funded by the U.S. government and various Roman Catholic organisations. Diệm had strong support from American Roman Catholic politicians and the powerful Cardinal Francis Spellman and his elder brother, Pierre Martin Ngô Đình Thục, was Archbishop of Huế. Ba Cụt presciently noted that the referendum was a means "for Diem to gather the people from all towns and force them to demonstrate one goal: to depose Bao Dai and proclaim the puppet Diem as the chief-of-state of Vietnam." On the day of the poll, Ba Cụt's men prevented voting in the border regions which they controlled, and ventured out of the jungles to attack polling stations in Cần Thơ. Despite that disruption, Diệm was fraudulently credited with more than 90% of support in Hòa Hảo-controlled territory, and a near unanimous turnout was recorded in the area. These results were replicated across the nation, and Diệm deposed Bảo Đại.

Eventually, Ba Cụt was surrounded, and sought to make a peace deal with the Diệm government to avoid being taken prisoner. Ba Cụt sent a message to Nguyễn Ngọc Thơ, the public official who oversaw the civilian side of the campaign against the Hòa Hảo, asking for negotiations so that his men could be integrated into mainstream society and the nation's armed forces. Thơ agreed to meet Ba Cụt alone in the jungle, and despite fears that the meeting was a Hòa Hảo trap, he was not ambushed. However, Ba Cụt began asking for additional concessions and the meeting ended in a stalemate. According to historian Hue-Tam Ho Tai, Ba Cụt's lifelong antipathy towards Thơ's family influenced his behavior during his last stand. Ba Cụt was arrested by a patrol on 13 April 1956, and his remaining forces were defeated in battle. Contemporary political commentators based in France and Vietnam saw his capture as the death knell for domestic military opposition to President Diệm, while U.S. Embassy official Daniel Anderson speculated that defeat of "the most able and spectacular leader" of the sects would lead to a collapse in non-communist armed opposition.

== Trial and execution ==
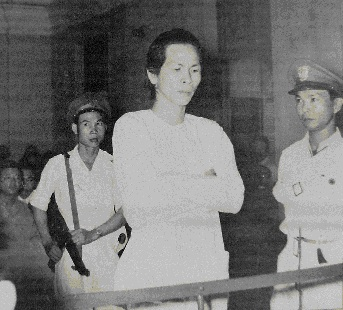
Ba Cụt during his trial

Initially, American observers thought that Diệm might try a reconciliatory approach and reintegrate Ba Cụt into society to increase the appeal of his government, rather than punish the Hòa Hảo leader. They felt that Ba Cụt had a high level of military skill and popular appeal that could be used in favor of the government, citing his colorful "Robin Hood" image as an attraction with the rural populace. U.S. officials were also worried that a harsh punishment such as the death penalty could provoke an anti-government backlash, and that it could be exploited by other opposition groups. However, Diệm saw Ba Cụt as contrary to Vietnamese values of struggle and self-sacrifice and felt that strong measures were required.

Diệm's government put Ba Cụt on trial for treason, under Article 146 of the Military Code of the Republic of Vietnam. Diệm spoke out and accused Ba Cụt of rallying to and defecting from the central government four times from 1945 to 1954, and that at his peak in mid-1954, Ba Cụt commanded 3,500 troops armed with 3,200 firearms. Ba Cụt was also accused of collaborating with the communists. The government submitted that the charge of treason was established by a series of attacks on VNA personnel, officers and vehicles from July 1954 until Ba Cụt's capture. The government prosecutor sought the death penalty and tendered petitions signed by residents of the Mekong Delta and southwestern Vietnam calling for the military destruction of Ba Cụt's militants. However, according to the historian Jessica Chapman, these petitions were organized by the government and heavily publicized in the Diệm-controlled media, and not representative of public opinion.

During the proceedings, Ba Cụt theatrically removed his shirt so that the public gallery could see how many scars he had suffered while fighting the communists. This, according to him, demonstrated his devotion to Vietnamese nationalism. He challenged any other man to show as many scars. However, the Diệmist judge was unimpressed. Ba Cụt was found guilty of arson and multiple murders and sentenced to death on 11 June. An appeal was dismissed on 27 June. On 4 July, Ba Cụt was also found guilty in a military court and sentenced to death "with degradation and confiscation of his property". It then fell to Diệm to consider a plea for clemency. Diệm rejected this and ordered the Justice Minister to put in place the orders for execution. On the very same day, a Hòa Hảo lawyer lodged an appeal against all of the verdicts to the Supreme Appeals Court in Saigon, but the submissions were rejected in a matter of hours.

The Hòa Hảo reacted strongly to the legal verdicts as "shameful and unjust". The Dân Xã issued a statement describing the verdict and death penalty as being motivated by spite and being unsupported by evidence. Ba Cụt's defense counsel said the trial set a bad precedent for South Vietnam's fledgling legal system and questioned the integrity of the process. He claimed that VNA troops had engaged in mass rape and plunder of local civilians in their final push against Ba Cụt, and accused the Diệm regime of double standards in not investigating and prosecuting these alleged incidents. He claimed that South Vietnam had "no democracy and no freedom" and "only shamelessness and foolishness" and said that members of the Hòa Hảo would continue to resist the Saigon administration politically and militarily.

In addition, Diệm's adviser, Colonel Edward Lansdale from the CIA, was one of many who protested against the decision. Lansdale felt that the execution would tarnish Diệm—who had proclaimed the Republic of Vietnam (commonly known as South Vietnam) and declared himself President—and antagonize Ba Cụt's followers. Ngô Đình Nhu, Diệm's younger brother and chief adviser, denied a reprieve as the army, particularly Minh, opposed any clemency. Some sections of the southern public, however, were sympathetic to Ba Cụt, who was compared to a character from the Wild West.

Ba Cụt was publicly guillotined at 5:40 am on 13 July 1956, in a cemetery in Cần Thơ. A crowd numbering in the hundreds, including members of Diệm's National Assembly, Minh, regional officials and both domestic and overseas journalists witnessed the beheading. Anderson believed the use of the guillotine, instead of a firing squad, as was normal for military executions, was used to emphasize that Ba Cụt's actions were being portrayed as common crimes rather than as political opposition. Chapman said that the dual military and civilian trial indicated that Diệm viewed any opposition activities as not only politically unacceptable but also as crimes related to bad character.

Ba Cụt's body was later diced into small pieces, which were then buried separately. Some followers, led by a hardcore deputy named Bảy Đớm, retreated to a small area beside the Cambodian border, where they vowed not to rest until Ba Cụt was avenged. Many of his followers later joined the Việt Cộng—the movement that succeeded the Việt Minh their leader had fought—and took up arms against Diệm.
