= Huỳnh Phú Sổ =

Vietnamese religious figure (1920–1947) who founded Hòa Hảo

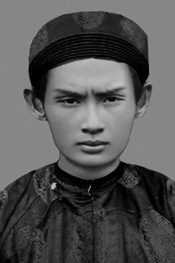
- A digitally remastered photo of Huỳnh Phú Sổ.
- Born: 15 January 1920; An Giang, Cochinchina
- Died: April 16, 1947 (aged 27); Long Xuyên, Cochinchina
- Other names: Đức Thầy (lit. "Virtuous Master"); Đức Huỳnh Giáo Chủ (lit. Virtuous Patriarch Huỳnh)
- Known for: Founder of Hòa Hảo

Huỳnh Phú Sổ (Vietnamese: [hʷɨ̀n fǔ ʂô]; 15 January 1920 – 16 April 1947), popularly known as Đức Thầy (lit. 'Virtuous Master') or Đức Huỳnh Giáo Chủ (lit. 'Virtuous Patriarch Huỳnh'), was the founder of the Hòa Hảo religious tradition.

== Early years ==
Born in the village of Hòa Hảo, near Châu Đốc, Southern Vietnam, French Indochina, in 1920, Sổ was the son of a moderately wealthy peasant. Plagued in his youth by illness, he was a mediocre student and graduated from high school only because of his father's influence. He was a brave child, so his father sent him to Núi Cấm in the Seven Mountains to learn from a hermit who was both a mystic and a healer. After some training, Sổ made his mark during a stormy night in May 1939, having returned to his village after his master's death. While in an agitated state, Sổ appeared to have suddenly been cured of his illnesses and started to propound his religious teachings, which were based on Buddhism, on that spot. According to observers, he spoke for several hours spontaneously "with eloquence and erudition about the sublime dogmas of Buddhism ... The witnesses to this miracle, deeply impressed by the strange scene, became his first converts."

His simplified teachings were designed to appeal primarily to the poor and the peasants. He attempted to win supporters by cutting down on ceremonies and complex doctrines, eschewing the use of temples. He won over followers by offering free consultations and performing purported miracle cures with simple herbs and acupuncture, and preaching at street corners and canal intersections. He quickly built up a following in the southern Mekong Delta and was looked to by his disciples for guidance in their daily lifestyles. In a time of colonial occupation, a native religion appealed to the masses who were displaying nationalist sentiment. Unlike Gautama Buddha, Sổ was Vietnamese. As a result, Sổ became a nationalist icon and became a wanted man for the French colonial authorities, having gained 100,000 followers in less than a year. He predicted that politics would be the cause of his premature death.

The cult must stem much more from internal faith than from a pompous appearance. It is better to pray with a pure heart before the family altar than to perform gaudy ceremonies in a pagoda, clad in the robes of an unworthy bonze.

== Proselytising and imprisonment ==
In early 1940, after a few weeks in retreat to compose and put on paper oracles, prayers and teachings, Sổ launched a major campaign through the Mekong Delta. He recruited tens of thousands of converts to his movement who followed him around in his travels. His reputation grew immensely after a series of his predictions came true: the outbreak of World War II, the fall of France to Nazi Germany, and the Japanese invasion of French Indochina. His prediction of a Japanese invasion prompted many rice farmers to desert their farms en masse and flee to the hills. The French derided him as the "mad bonze". As his movement became politicised, it began to attract aspiring politicians, with the likes of Huynh Cong Bo, a prominent landowner, and its future military commanders, Trần Văn Soái and Lâm Thành Nguyên. Nguyen claimed that Sổ had cured him of illness.

Fearing anti-French demonstrations and revolts would occur as a result of Sổ's following, Vichy French governor Jean Decoux decided to act. In August, Sổ was detained in the psychiatric hospital at Chợ Quán hospital near Saigon under the reasoning that he was a lunatic. Sổ famously succeeded in converting his psychiatrist, Dr. Tam, who became an ardent and devout supporter (Tam was later executed by the Việt Minh for his activities). A board of French psychiatrists declared him sane in May 1941, reporting that he was "a little maniacal, very ignorant even in Buddhist practices, but a windbag." He was exiled upon his release to the coastal town of Bạc Liêu in the far south. His key supporters were interned on Mount Bà Rá. French restrictions and coercions strengthened his nationalist appeal, and Bạc Liêu soon became a place of Hòa Hảo pilgrimage, although it was far from the movement's strongholds.

In 1942, the French could no longer withstand the growing popular reactions generated by Sổ's oracular pronouncements and political instructions. They exiled him to Laos. By that time the Japanese had taken over French Indochina, but had left the French apparatus in place, intervening only when they saw fit. The Japanese intercepted the transfer of Sổ with the help of some Hòa Hảo followers and brought him back to Saigon. The Kempeitai kept him under protection and the Japanese authorities rebuffed French protests and demands for extradition by saying that he was held as a "Chinese spy". He avoided accusations of being a Japanese collaborator by predicting their demise, but his contacts with them allowed his supporters to gain weapons. He was considered a mystic.

== Military campaign ==
Flag of the Hòa Hảo

In 1945, as the Japanese were defeated and Vietnam fell into a power vacuum, Sổ ordered the creation of armed units for campaigns against the local administration, landowners and French colonial forces. This led to the Hòa Hảo becoming less of a religious and more of a military-political movement, as people such as landowners converted in the hope that they could buy protection.

As the Hòa Hảo began battling the French, they also came into conflict with other military organizations such as the Việt Minh (communists) and Cao Đài who were also fighting the French. The Hòa Hảo were in control of most of the Mekong Delta and was unwilling to toe the Việt Minh line from Hanoi. On 9 September 1945, a confrontation arose when a band of 15,000 Hòa Hảo, armed with hand-to-hand weapons, attacked the Việt Minh garrison at Cần Thơ. With their antiquated weapons, Sổ's men were slaughtered, losing thousands. Sổ's brother and the brother of his commander Soái were captured and executed. The return of French forces helped to keep the Hòa Hảo and the Việt Minh apart, but the Hòa Hảo periodically sought vengeance on the Việt Minh by tying sympathisers of the latter together and throwing them into the river to drown. The Việt Minh were worried by Sổ's nationalist credentials and social structure, and attempted to co-opt him into a National Unified Front. It was dissolved in July 1946 after it was apparent that Sổ would not follow the Việt Minh. Sổ entered politics openly by creating the Viet Nam Democratic Socialist Party, known as the Dân Xã. This defiant move made him a target of the Việt Minh as relations deteriorated.

== Death ==
The southern Việt Minh leader, Nguyễn Bình, realising that Sổ would not subordinate himself to the Việt Minh, set up a trap. Sổ was caught and disappeared on 16 April 1947. He was believed to have been killed by the Viet Minh. According to Vietnamese police documents, Huỳnh Phú Sổ was arrested and executed on December 22, 1947, by the Viet Minh in Long Xuyen. However, according to historian Shawn McHale, he was most likely killed on 16 April; later dates were simply fabricated by the Viet Minh leadership, along with a fake trial, to justify his murder.

Following his death, the Hòa Hảo's political and military power diminished as its various commanders began infighting in the absence of a centralized leadership structure; it became basically a network of warlords, the most famous being Trần Văn Soái, named a "one-star general" by the French (a rank which does not exist in the French Army, so Văn Soái added a second one on his kepi), and Ba Cụt.

== Sources ==
- Buttinger, Joseph (1967). Vietnam: A Dragon Embattled. New York: Praeger Publishers.
- Fall, Bernard (1963). The Two Viet-Nams. New York: Praeger Publishers.
- Tran My-Van (2003). "Beneath the Japanese Umbrella: Vietnam's Hòa Hảo during and after the Pacific War". Crossroads: An Interdisciplinary Journal of Southeast Asian Studies. 17 (1): 60–107. JSTOR 40860807.
