= Chợ Mới district, An Giang =

Coordinates: 10°33′N 105°24′E

Chợ Mới district Huyện Chợ Mới
- District
- Seal

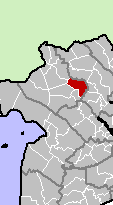
- Location in An Giang province
- Country: Vietnam
- Province: An Giang
- Established: 1939
- Capital: Chợ Mới

Population (2019)
  - Total: 307,981
- Time zone: UTC+07:00 (Indochina Time)

Chợ Mới was a rural district (huyện) of An Giang province in the Mekong Delta region of Vietnam. Chợ Mới is the district with the largest population in An Giang province. As of 2019, the district had a population of 307,981. The district covers 355 km^{2} (137 sq mi). The district's capital lies at Chợ Mới.

In addition to the district capital Chợ Mới, there are two other urban subdivisions, Mỹ Luông Town and Hội An Town. The rural communes are: Kiến An, Kiến Thành, Mỹ Hội Đông, Nhơn Mỹ, Long Giang, Long Điền A, Long Điền B, Tân Mỹ, Mỹ Hiệp, Bình Phước Xuân, Long Kiến, An Thạch Trung, Hòa Bình and Hoà An. The district is heavily criss-crossed by waterways in the delta, causing the district to consist of small islands. Hòa Hảo, Cao Đài, Protestantism and Roman Catholicism are the main religions.

On June 16, 2025, the Standing Committee of the National Assembly issued Resolution No. 1685/NQ-UBTVQH15. The ward was dissolved and new wards were rearranged from the district.
