= Anarchism in Vietnam =

Anarchism in Vietnam first emerged in the early 20th century, as the Vietnamese, through demonstrations, strikes and armed insurrection, continued their struggle against the French colonial government and its puppet feudal dynasty. Some popular anti-colonial figures such as Phan Bội Châu and Nguyễn An Ninh were exposed to strands of anarchist thought in Japan, China, and France. But in the course of the 1920s and 30s, such influence these may have had upon popular movements were more than countered by the Marxism-Leninism of the emerging Vietnamese communist movement. In recent years, Anarchist ideas in Vietnam has attracted new adherents.

== History ==
The roots of anarchism in Vietnam lay in the early resistance to French colonial rule, organized among various secret societies. Among these were the Heaven and Earth Society, which in 1884 had assassinated a colonial collaborator in Saigon. Other attacks against the French colonial authorities included the Cần Vương movement, which attempted to overthrow the French during the late 1880s, the Hanoi Poison Plot, in which indigenous Vietnamese troops attempted to assassinate the entire French garrison in the Citadel of Hanoi, as well as subsequent anti-colonial uprisings in Cochinchina and Tonkin.

Official French colonial publications implied that these Vietnamese secret societies and religious sects could be easily coopted by revolutionaries, due to their status as indigenous methods of organizing, echoing Mikhail Bakunin's claim that social bandits were "instinctive revolutionaries".

=== International origins ===
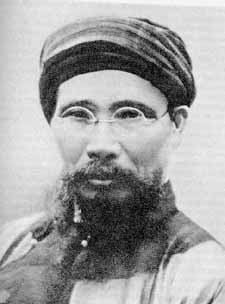
Phan Bội Châu, the activist that first brought anarchist ideas to Vietnamese radicalism, from his time with anarchists in Japan and China.

Anarchism was first introduced to the Vietnamese anti-colonial movement during the 1900s by the early nationalist leader Phan Bội Châu. In January 1905, Phan moved to Japan, where he was exposed to a variety of new political ideas being propagated among Chinese expatriates, including the constitutionalism of Liang Qichao, the republicanism of the Tongmenghui, and the anarchism of the Tokyo group. Initially a utilitarian, Phan began to rapidly move through a variety of political ideologies and made acquaintance with a number of politically diverse groups and individuals in Japan. In 1907, Phan founded the Constitutionalist Association (Vietnamese: Cong Hien Hoi), an organization of Vietnamese expatriate students which advocated for constitutional monarchy, but by 1908 it was forcibly disbanded by the Japanese authorities, at the request of the French. That same year, Phan joined the Asian Friendship Association, an organization founded by the exiled Chinese republicans and anarchists, as well as Japanese socialists. The Association was largely directed by Liu Shipei, a prominent member of the Tokyo anarchist group and editor of its newspaper Natural Justice, and included many other Chinese anarchists such as Chang Chi, who was a close friend of Phan's.

But by 1909, Phan Bội Châu was ordered to leave Japan and spent the subsequent years drifting around East Asia. After the overthrow of the Qing dynasty during the 1911 revolution, Phan was invited to the newly established Republic of China by his old Chinese republican friends from Japan, Zhang Binglin and Chen Qimei. In January 1912, Phan arrived in China and settled in Guangdong, now under the governorship of his friend Hu Hanmin, who was actively providing a place of refuge for Vietnamese exiles. Here, with the financial aid of the Guangzhou anarchist Liu Shifu, Phan formed a new republican and nationalist organization called the Vietnamese Restoration League (Vietnamese: Việt Nam Quang Phục Hội), modeled after Sun Yat-Sen's Tongmenghui and drawing its name from Zhang Binglin's Restoration Society. Shifu also encouraged Phan to establish the Association for the Revitalization of China, an organization dedicated to soliciting Chinese support for the independence movements in colonized Asian countries, including Indochina, India, Burma and Korea. Upon moving to Shanghai, Phan joined the Worldwide League for Humanity, a clandestine anarchist organization which went unrecognized by the new Beiyang government due to its "extreme-left program."

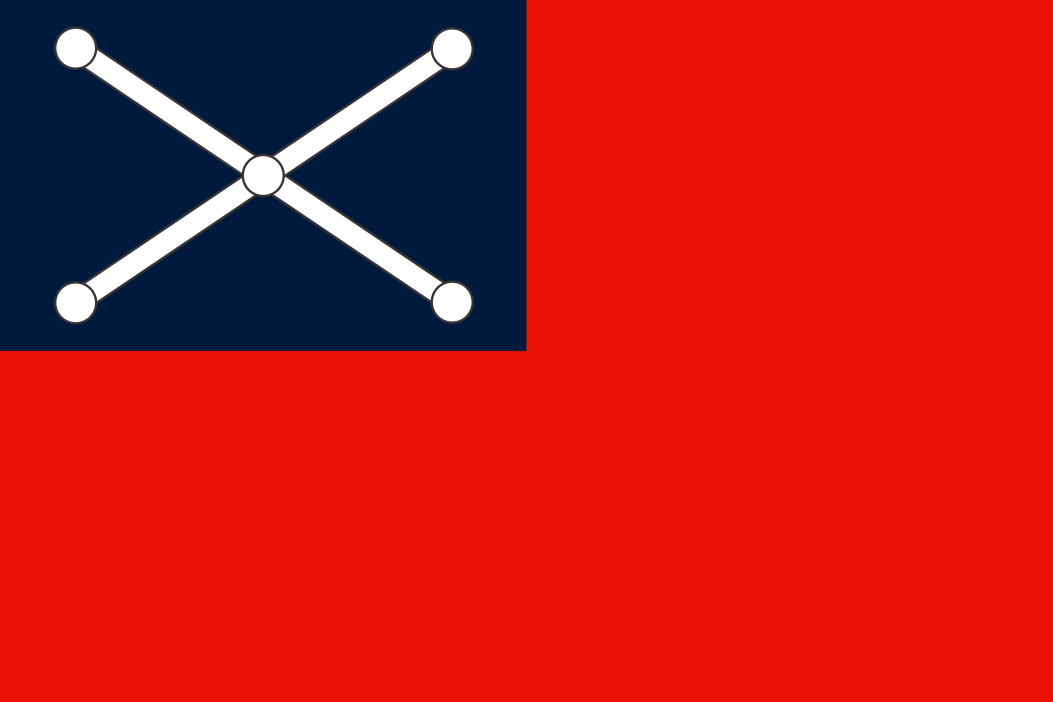
Flag of the Vietnamese Restoration League.

As more Vietnamese expatriates joined up with internationalist organizations in China, they increasingly came into contact with anarchist individuals and groups. Phan Bội Châu himself, who had developed ties with the Tokyo strand of Chinese anarchism led by Zhang Binglin and Liu Shipei, was inspired by their traditionalist approach to anarchism and socialism. Phan was particularly inspired by the anarchist positions on anti-imperialism and direct action, leading him to defend the violent overthrow of the French colonial authorities, even to the chagrin of his republican allies like Hu Hanmin and Chen Qimei. Developing on propaganda of the deed, Phan admired past assassination attempts against state officials and encouraged the targeting of French colonial officials, leading to a series of bombings in Hanoi, which brought both increased publicity and reprisals against the Restoration League. Several of the League's activists were executed, internationalist organizations in China began to disintegrate and Phan himself was arrested and imprisoned by the Beiyang government. While Phan was in prison, Liu Shifu died of tuberculosis in 1915, Chen Qimei was assassinated in 1916 and Zhang Binglin abandoned anarchism and gave up on political pursuits, leaving Phan politically isolated by the time of his release in February 1917. After briefly coming under the influence of a collaborationist advocate, Phan turned his interests towards socialism, inspired by the socialist currents of the Russian and Chinese revolutions.

Following the end of World War I, many more Vietnamese radicals went into exile, looking for knowledge that was being suppressed in French Indochina. People from Annam and Tonkin largely went to China or Japan, where they were exposed to social anarchist tendencies, whilst those from Cochinchina went to France, where they became influenced by French strands of individualist anarchism. While Vietnamese expatriates that took up the Chinese strand of anarchism tended to employ aspects of traditionalism, expatriates inspired by French anarchism employed a more radical, youth-oriented and forward-looking philosophy.

=== Growth and spread of anarchism ===
This diversity of opinion among Vietnamese anarchists was reflected upon the exiles' return to Vietnam. Political opposition was harshly repressed in the northern colonies of Annam and Tonkin, the anti-colonial movement turned to illegal activism and violent actions against colonial authorities. This, combined with the social anarchism brought back from abroad, laid the groundwork for the formation of political organizations. But in the southern colony of Cochinchina, freedom of the press existed, allowing Vietnamese radicals to participate in open political discourse, which defused political tensions. Upon his return from France, Nguyễn An Ninh found a place in radical journalism, publishing political tracts in his journal La Cloche Fêlée which encouraged the synthesis of the social struggle for individual liberties with the national struggle for Vietnamese independence. Ninh called for the youth of Vietnam to reinvent itself and take control of its own destiny, becoming incredibly popular amongst his peers, as his rhetorical tone marked a stark contrast to the tendency towards moderation and compromise. Ninh critiqued the Confucian family values of parental authority and gender inequality, as well as traditional morality, encouraging people to "break with the past and free themselves from tyranny of all kinds" and create a genuinely new culture. He also attacked the bureaucratism of the colonial state, the native Vietnamese bourgeoisie and traditional Confucian society. Ninh revealed his libertarian sympathies in his article Order and Anarchy, quoting such authors as Rabindranath Tagore and Leo Tolstoy. Ninh's anti-authoritarianism also extended into his personal life, as he got himself into a number of conflicts with colonial officials. In addition, while Ninh admired the Soviet Union, he positioned himself firmly against a Bolshevik-style revolution due to its human cost, preferring the route of individuals directly undermining social inequalities rather than partaking in revolutionary violence. However, as time passed, Ninh increasingly saw revolution as inevitable and began to agitate for organized resistance to achieve social justice.

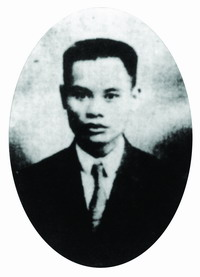
Phạm Hồng Thái, the attempted assassin of the Governor-General Martial Henri Merlin.

By this time, Phan Bội Châu's political influence was largely marginalized and his followers in the Restoration League began to leave him behind. Despite attempts to keep the League alive, its prominent members started to criticize it for its elitism and called for Vietnamese revolutionaries to immerse themselves among the common people. In 1923, the Society of Like Hearts (Vietnamese: Tam Tam Xa emerged from these critical anarchist currents of the revolutionary movement, inspired in particular by the works of Liu Shifu, and attempted to unite disparate Vietnamese anti-colonial activists around collective decision-making. The Society also employed the use of direct action to destabilize the colonial administration, with Phạm Hồng Thái launching an assassination attempt against Governor-General Martial Henri Merlin. Although the attempt itself failed, it reinvigorated the Vietnamese anti-colonial movement and Thái became known as a revolutionary martyr. In response, Phan Bội Châu attempted to open a military academy to train Vietnamese revolutionaries, meeting with the anarchist elder Cai Yuanpei and agents of the Communist International to discuss this project, but it ultimately did not materialize. With the Restoration League failing to reform itself along the lines of the Chinese Nationalist Party and the Society of Hearts unable to successfully follow the assassination attempt, both organizations began to decline into irrelevance. Following a reorganization in 1924, the Phuc Viet party attempted to mobilize public opinion towards anti-colonialism, with Ton Quang Phiet writing the article Southern Wind, highlighting the need for organization. However, none of these anarchist organizations had presented a clear vision of a future society and had not developed a solid analysis of the present society, thus were left without a strong ideological foundation to unite behind. In 1925, French agents seized Phan Bội Châu in Shanghai. He was convicted of treason and spent the rest of his life under house arrest in Huế. On March 21, 1926, Nguyễn An Ninh was also arrested and only days later, Phan Chu Trinh died, causing mass protests against the government in April 1926. It was in this atmosphere that a young Marxist called Nguyễn Ái Quốc emerged onto the scene, having links to both strands of Vietnamese anarchism and taking on a role as a fierce critic of radicalism.

=== Revolutionary socialism and anarchist populism ===
Nguyễn Ái Quốc, the leader of the early Vietnamese communist movement and founder of the Communist Party of Vietnam.

The first known instance of the introduction of the word "revolution" into Vietnam came through the writings of the Chinese activist Liang Qichao, (1873–1929). In the midst of China's New Culture Movement of the 1910s and 1920s, Qichao advocated for a widespread cultural revolution, rather than for a violent political revolution. The definition of "revolution" as adopted in Vietnam meant "changing the Mandate of Heaven" (Vietnamese: cách mạng), which was interpreted in many different ways. One of the first revolutionary tracts was Nguyễn Thượng Hiền's On Revolution, published on January 3, 1925, in which he called for a peaceful boycott movement, inspired by the Swadeshi movement organized by Mohandas K. Gandhi, but in which he also failed to define the means nor the ends of a revolution in Vietnam. The restriction of the distribution of French-language literature, such as documents of the Enlightenment or of Marxism, meant that only French-educated urban elements were exposed to them, which reinforced the elitist tendencies that pervaded Vietnamese radicalism and ensured the continuation of the idea that the revolution was a top-down affair organized by intellectuals, rather than a mass uprising.

Revolutionary socialist ideas began to work their way into Vietnam through the writings of Vladimir Lenin and its affinity with Vietnamese collectivist living. By the 1920s, socialism and anarchism, initially hyphenated and synonymous, grew into disparate ideological currents. The rise of communism in China and in France provided considerably more exposure to pro-Bolshevik currents which, combined with the fallout from the suppression of the Kronstadt rebellion of March 1921, increased hostility towards anarchist ideas.

Nguyễn Ái Quốc (1890–1969) solicited aid from the Communist International (founded in 1919) for support in the Vietnamese anti-colonial struggle, but himself was skeptical of forming an openly communist movement in the country, due to what he saw as a "political naïveté" among Vietnamese radicals. He particularly criticized Nguyễn Thượng Hiền's work, insisting on a particular need to reject reformism and evolutionary change in favor of a political revolution, and further critiqued the use of non-violent boycott-movements. In early 1925, Quốc established the Vietnamese Revolutionary Youth League to organize young Vietnamese people towards collective action. Anarchism, as championed by Nguyễn An Ninh, still presented a significant challenge to Quốc's nascent communist movement, as it appealed to the same young people that the communists were trying to recruit. Quốc himself presented a fierce criticism of anarchism:

Nowadays, anarchism is nonsense; to spread anarchism is as stupid as proposing to a dying man that he should fight in hand-to-hand combat, or run a race.

— Nguyễn Ái Quốc, Youth, 26 July 1925

Quốc also critiqued the anarcho-communism proposed by Peter Kropotkin, taking the Orthodox Marxist line that the state could only wither away after wealth was redistributed and the people re-educated. Although he admired the ideal of creating a post-revolutionary society without laws, he concluded that anarchist theories would only serve to "sow disorder in society", particularly attempting to refute the anarchist critique of political parties, a critique which presented the greatest challenge to his own ambitions.

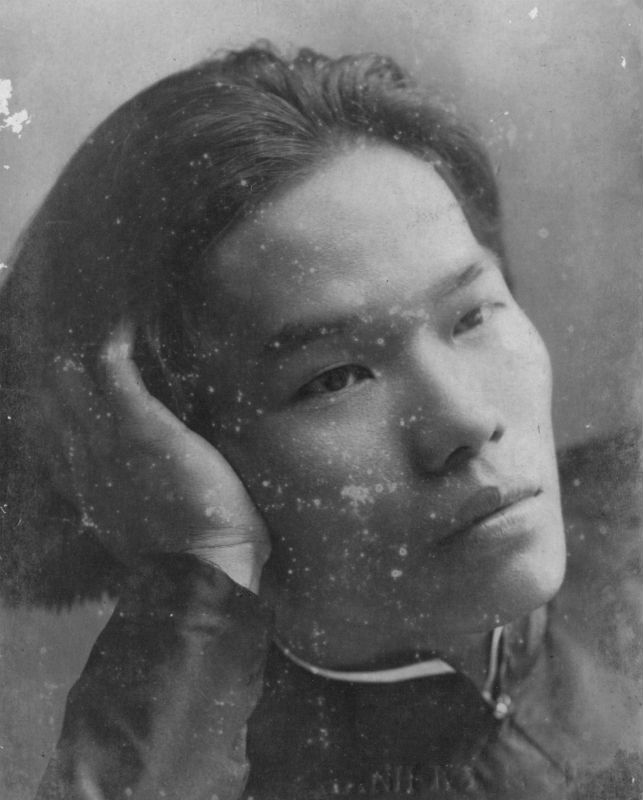
Nguyễn An Ninh, the leader of the anarchist populist movement which rivaled the early communists during the 1920s

Despite these challenges from the emerging communist movement, Nguyễn An Ninh (1900–1943) set about building a revolutionary populist movement to advance the anarchist cause, establishing the Nguyen An Ninh Secret Society in 1926. Ninh envisaged a revolutionary vanguard, but in contrast to the political-party system advanced by Leninism, he advocated a loose movement resulting from the moral and intellectual transformation of individuals. He sharply criticized the authoritarianism of political parties that sought power, while also growing more hostile to the bourgeoisie. I Instead of party politics, he saw the path to an anti-authoritarian liberation movement as lying in anarchist populism, embracing the concept of revolutionary spontaneity. I Ninh also followed the Bakuninist school of thought regarding the revolutionary potential of the lumpenproletariat (a class which Orthodox Marxists largely neglected) and sought to organise the Vietnamese underclasses. Ninh's revolutionary populism began to spread rapidly through Hóc Môn, his home district of Saigon. Following Ninh's release from prison in 1927, he began to actively agitate among workers and peasants in and around Saigon. In 1928 he began travelling from place to place by bicycle with the aid of local monks and peasants. By March 1928 the Sûreté had discovered the existence of Ninh's Secret Society, known publicly as the "Aspirations of Youth Party". The Society recruited people into its mutual-friendship and mutual-aid associations while also (according to the Sûreté) establishing militia structures organized by local villages. Although the organizational structure of the Secret Society was very loose-knit, Ninh's associates managed to recruit up to 800 members from the workers and peasants of Saigon. Ninh proposed that the Society merge with a number of revolutionary political parties. The Revolutionary Party of New Vietnam turned down the proposal, preferring to retain a small and ideologically homogenous membership, despite the potential offered by the Society's much larger size. The Nationalist Party of Vietnam also rejected this proposal, as it was turned off by the extremism of Ninh's anarcho-populist politics.

On September 28, 1928, Nguyễn An Ninh and his associate, Phan Văn Hùm were arrested after an altercation with the police and given prison sentences. The Sûreté subsequently exposed Ninh's Secret Society and detained 500 of his followers, with 115 standing trial over the following year. While Ninh was in prison, some activists managed to keep the Society going, but when a series of uprisings, strikes and demonstrations broke out in March 1930, many of Ninh's followers gravitated to the Indochinese Communist Party (founded in October 1930).

=== La Lutte and the United Front ===
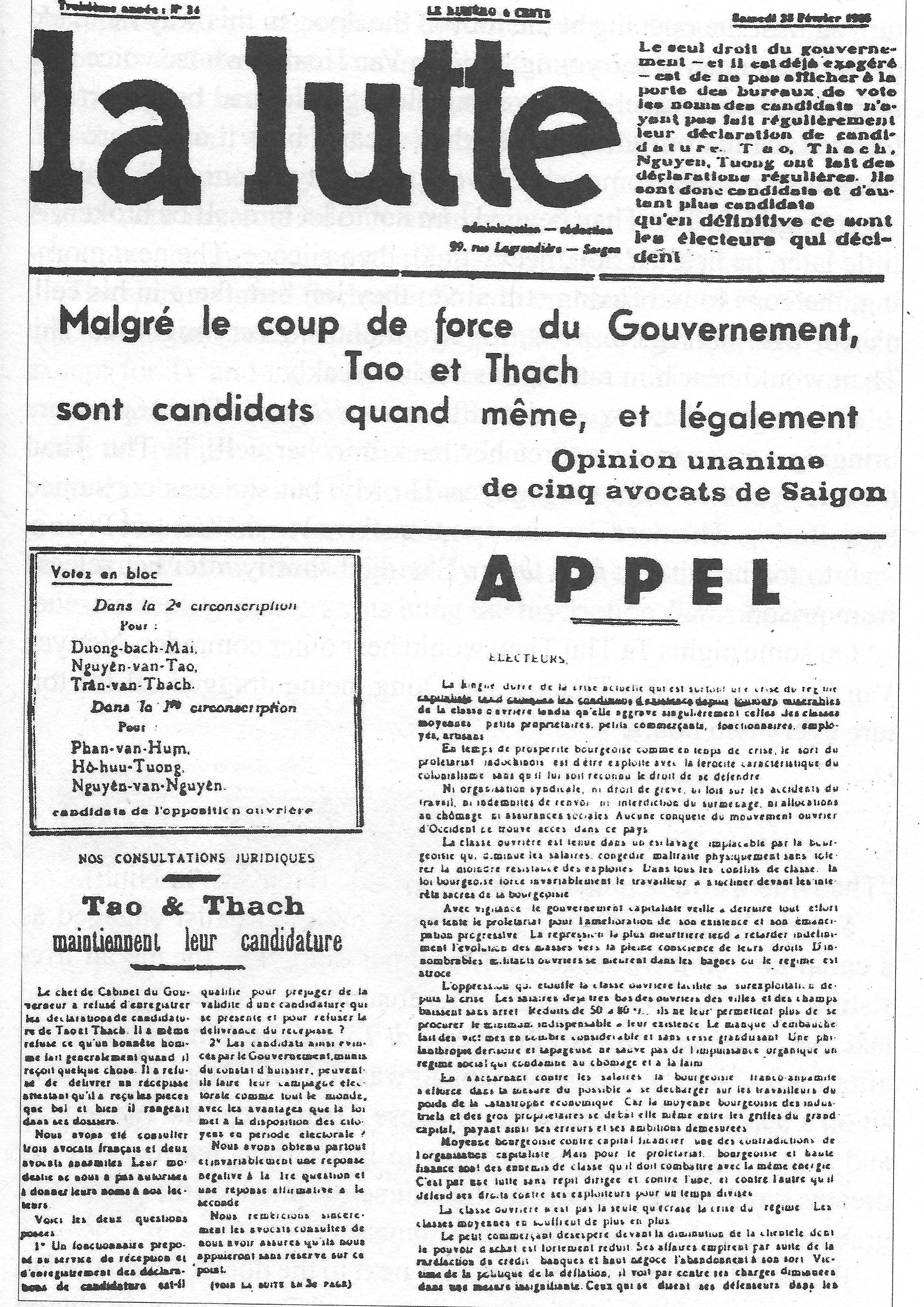
La Lutte, a newspaper that brought together multiple differing left-wing tendencies, including Trotskyists, Stalinists, nationalists and anarchists.

Upon his release from prison in October 1931, Nguyễn An Ninh returned to his organizing work in the countryside. Ninh served as a unifying non-partisan presence for anti-colonial elements to join in a united front and legally oppose the government in the Saigon municipal elections of 1933, uniting members of the Communist Party with nationalists, Trotskyists and anarchists. They rallied support through the publication of the newspaper La Lutte and succeeded in electing two members of the alliance to the Saigon city council. In October 1934, Ninh revived the La Lutte collaboration to run various campaigns and participate in elections, "focused squarely on the plight of the urban poor, the workers and peasant labourers."

Flag of La Lutte.

In the Cochinchinese parliamentary election of March 1935, the La Lutte group received 17% of the vote, although they failed to win a seat. There was also a La Lutte candidacy that ran in the May 1935 Saigon municipal election, in which four members of the alliance were elected, but three were invalidated due to their communist sympathies. The alliance also went on to organize a number of strikes in the subsequent years.

However, the united front was soon brought to an end in 1936, when the newly elected Popular Front government failed to deliver on its promises of colonial reform. The Trotskyists led by Tạ Thu Thâu, who took an oppositionist stance towards the new French government, soon became the dominant tendency within La Lutte, leading the Communist Party to split off from the alliance in 1937, launching their own newspaper and publishing attacks against the Trotskyists. In the 1939 Cochinchinese parliamentary election, the Trotskyists of La Lutte and the Communist Party ran on different lists. The Trotskyist "Workers' and Peasants' Slate" were victorious, electing three candidates with around 80% of the vote, whereas the Communist-backed "Democratic Front", which included Nguyễn An Ninh himself, was defeated with only 1% of the vote.

Following the signing of the Molotov–Ribbentrop Pact and the outbreak of World War II, the amicable relations between France and the Soviet Union were severed, leading France to undertake a repression of any seditious factions in Vietnam – sentencing Nguyễn An Ninh to 5 years in Côn Đảo Prison. During the war, Phan Bội Châu and Nguyễn An Ninh both died in captivity, bringing a definitive end to the leadership of anarchism in Vietnam.

=== Revolution and exiled radicalism ===
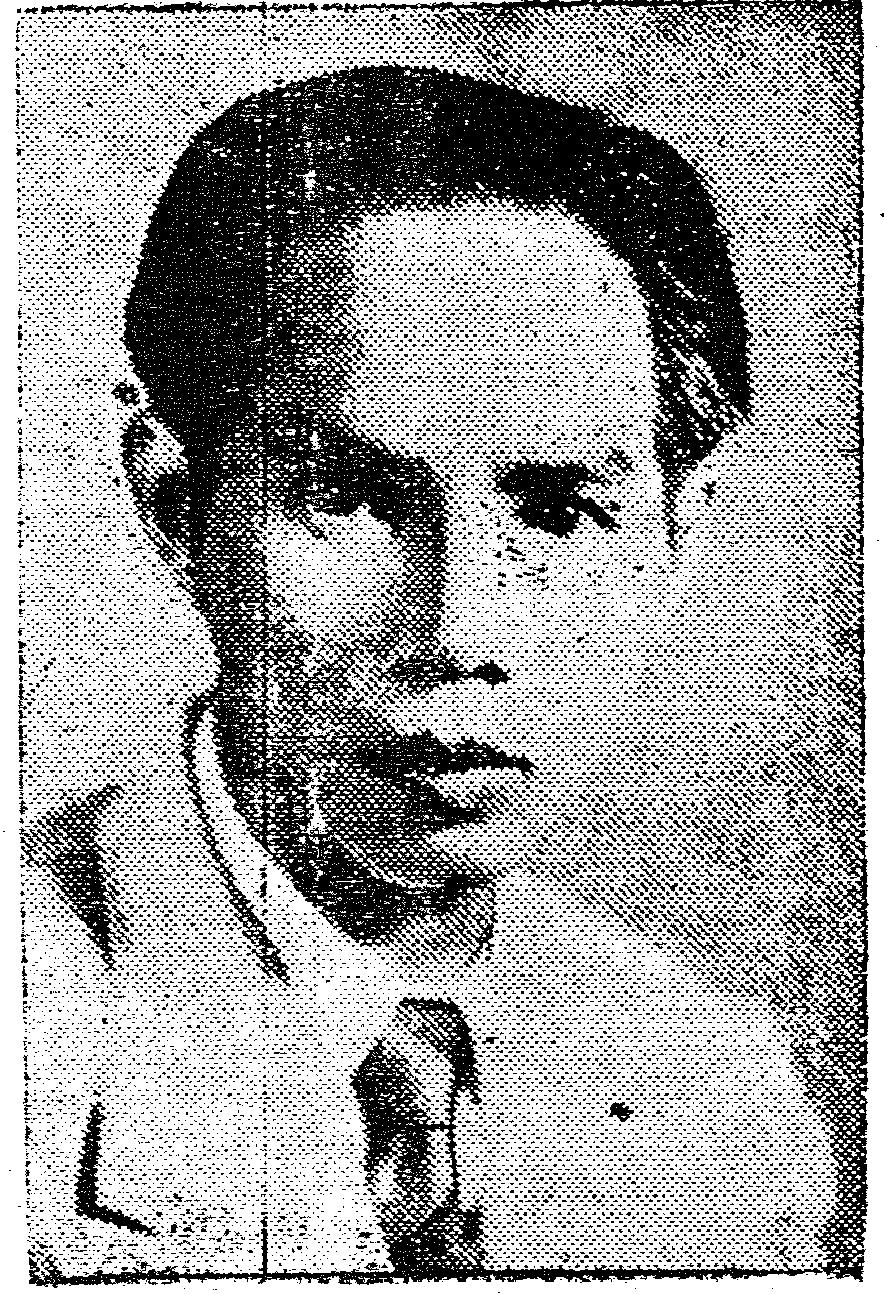
Phan Văn Hùm, leader of the Left Opposition to the Communist Party of Vietnam during the 1930s and 1940s, who was later captured and executed by the Viet Minh.

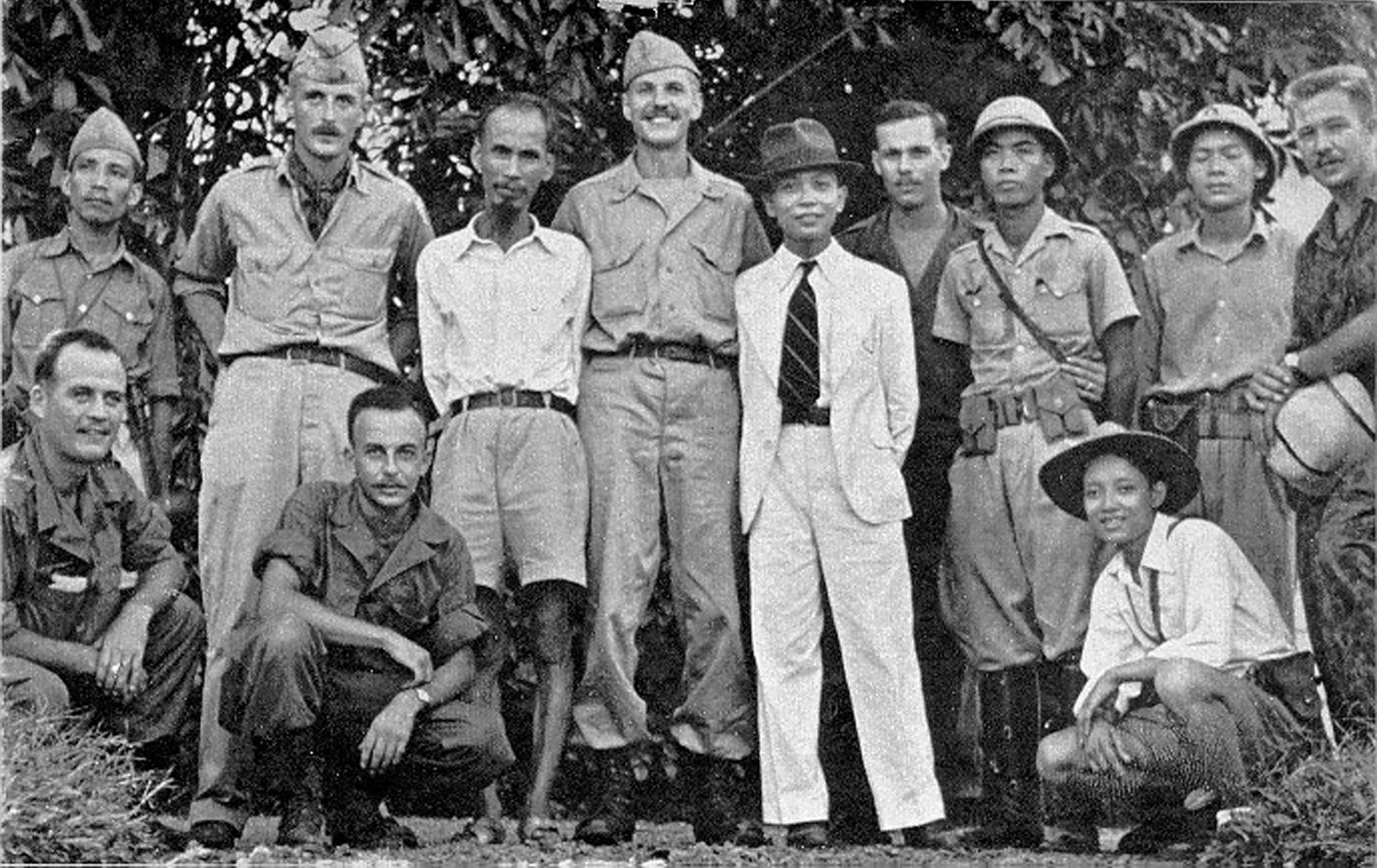
Members of the Viet Minh standing together with members of the OSS.

With the defeat and dissolution of the French Third Republic in the Battle of France, and the subsequent Japanese invasion of French Indochina, created an opportunity for Vietnamese anti-colonial activists to begin making preparations for independence. On May 19, 1941, Hồ Chí Minh established the League for the Independence of Vietnam (Viet Minh), an anti-imperialist coalition brought together to oppose both French colonialism and the Japanese occupation. Following the liberation of Paris by Allied forces, in March 1945 the Empire of Japan launched a coup d'état in Indochina, establishing the Empire of Vietnam as a puppet state. The new government led by Trần Trọng Kim oversaw widespread reforms including the expansion of education, territorial reunification, the encouragement of mass political participation and the even release of political prisoners, many of whom went over to the Viet Minh and began to actively agitate for the fall of the Empire. In August 1945, due to the resignation of the Vietnamese government and the subsequent surrender of Japan, the Imperial regime in Vietnam fell apart and the Emperor Bảo Đại officially abdicated.

The Viet Minh responded by launching the August Revolution, seizing control of most of the country and proclaimed the independence of the Democratic Republic of Vietnam on September 2, 1945. However, within a month the French Republic reasserted colonial rule over Vietnam, triggering a mass anti-colonial uprising in Saigon on September 23. Led by the International Communist League (ICL), the city's populace armed themselves and organized workers' councils, which they declared to be independent from any political parties. But by October, the workers' militias were defeated by the returning French colonial army. Forced into a retreat into the countryside after surviving a massacre by British and French colonial troops, members of the ICL including Phan Văn Hùm and Tạ Thu Thâu were hunted down and executed by the Viet Minh. After the First Indochina War, Vietnam was partitioned between the communist-held North and the anti-communist South.

Some of those who survived escaped to France, one of whom was Ngo Van, who met a number of Spanish anarchists and Poumistas that were also in exile in Paris. The encounters with the Spanish anarchist exiles and the stories of their experiences during the Spanish Civil War, which Van noted parallels with the Vietnamese experience, led him to permanently distance himself from Bolshevism, criticizing communist parties as seeking to form "the nucleus of a new ruling class and bring about nothing more than a new system of exploitation." Van found a political home with the International Workers' Association (IWA), which supported his criticisms of the Vietnamese Trotskyist exiles that remained supportive of the Democratic Republic of Vietnam. He also joined a Libertarian Marxist group around Maximilien Rubel and was introduced to the works of Friedrich Nietzsche. Van would later go on to participate in a factory occupation during the events of May 1968. He retired a few years after the Fall of Saigon and the reunification of Vietnam, and was finally able to return to his home country in 1998, where he noted that Vietnamese workers "still do not enjoy collective ownership of the means of production, nor [have] time for reflection, nor the possibility of making their own decisions, nor means of expression."

== See also ==
- Category:Vietnamese anarchists
- List of anarchist movements by region
- Communism in Vietnam
- Socialism in Vietnam
- Trotskyism in Vietnam
