= Mặt trận Quốc gia Thống nhất =

National Unified Front Mặt trận Quốc gia Thống nhất
- Abbreviation: MTQGTN; NUF
- Leader: Bảo Đại
- Chairman: Hồ Văn Ngà
- Founded: 14 August 1945
- Dissolved: 2 September 1945
- Headquarters: Saigon
- Armed wing: Dân quân Cách mạng (Revolutionary Militia)
- Ideology: Monarchism; Vietnamese nationalism
- Political position: Big tent

Party flag

The Mặt trận Quốc gia Thống nhất (National Unified Front) was a Vietnamese political alliance in the short-lived Empire of Vietnam. It was formed on 14 August 1945 in Southern Vietnam uniting all non-Viet Minh factions, including Trotskyists and the southern religious sects of Cao Đài and Hòa Hảo. Following the delayed arrival in Saigon on August 22, 1945, of the former president of the Journalists' Syndicate, and at the time Imperial Commissioner of Southern Vietnam Nguyen Van Sam, the alliance made an official declaration of national independence and territorial reunification.

The Front initially had its own paramilitary unit, the Advanced Guard Youth, which was under the leader of Dr. Phạm Ngọc Thạch. However Thạch led the unit over to the Viet Minh after the abdication of the Emperor Bảo Đại.

The leading role of the Trotskyist faction was brief and became irrelevant as leaders such as Phan Văn Chánh (d. 1945) and Phan Văn Hùm (d. 1946) were murdered or disappeared.

== Components ==
- Intellectual Group
- Match Group
- Union of Civil Servants
- Vanguard Youth: the chairman was Pham Ngoc Thach; joined in 1945. A small number of organization's leaders joined other political organizations.
- Vietnamese Pure Land Buddhist Laity Association: the leader was Lâm Văn Hậu.
- Vietnamese National Independence Party: the chairman was Hồ Văn Ngà.
- Hòa Hảo: the chief was Huỳnh Phú Sổ.
- Cao Đài: the chief was Phạm Công Tắc.
- Trotskyist Group: leader was Tạ Thu Thâu, Phan Văn Hùm, Phan Văn Chánh.

== Members ==
- Bảo Đại - Emperor of Nguyễn dynasty and Empire of Vietnam.
- Trần Trọng Kim - Chief of Cabinet of Empire of Vietnam.
- Hồ Văn Ngà
- Nguyễn Văn Sâm - Representative of Bảo Đại in Cochinchina.
- Phan Văn Hùm - Trotskyist politician.
- Phan Văn Chánh - Trotskyist politician.
- Phạm Công Tắc - Head of Cao Đài.
- Huỳnh Phú Sổ - Head of Hòa Hảo.
- Lâm Văn Hậu - Leader of Tịnh độ cư sĩ Phật hội Việt Nam.
- Nguyễn Bảo Toàn - Leader of VNQGĐLĐ.
- Phạm Ngọc Thạch - Chairman of Vanguard Youth.

== See also ==
- August Revolution
- Việt Minh
- Mặt trận Quốc gia Liên hiệp
