= International Communist League (Vietnam) =

International Communist League Liên minh Cộng sản Quốc tế
- Abbreviation: Đông Dương Đối lập Tả phái October Group
- Chairman: Hồ Hữu Tường (1932-1939); Lư Sanh Hạnh (1944-1946)
- Prominent leaders: Tạ Thu Thâu (Leader of Struggle Group); Phan Văn Hùm; Ngô Văn; Phan Văn Chánh; Đào Hưng Long; Huệ Minh
- Founded: 1932
- Dissolved: 1946
- Headquarters: Sài Gòn, Cochinchina, French Indochina
- Newspaper: Tháng Mười; Le Militant; Thầy Thợ; Tia Sáng
- Ideology: Communism; Leninism; Trotskyism; Revolutionary socialism Vietnamese nationalism
- National affiliation: Trotskyism in Vietnam (1939-1946)

Party flag

The International Communist League (LCI) was a Trotskyist political party in Vietnam. It was founded as the October Group in 1932, by a split in the Indochinese Bolshevik-Leninist Group, which also produced the Struggle Group. The group acquired its name from its journal, Tháng Mười (October).

The October Group supported but did not join La Lutte, a united front of the Struggle Group and the Indochinese Communist Party (PCI), as it would have had to withhold its criticisms of the PCI.

The October Group grew rapidly and began publishing a newspaper, Le Militant. This was suppressed by the colonial government in 1937 for supporting strikes. As a result, they again began publishing October, along with a new newspaper, Tia Sang, which in 1939 became a daily - perhaps the world's first daily Trotskyist newspaper.

With the outbreak of World War II, the leading figures in the group were arrested and the organisation banned. Activity did not resume until August 1944, when it was renamed the "International Communist League".

The LCI fully supported the workers' uprising against colonial rule at the end of the war. It organised committees to take power in over 150 towns. Its membership grew rapidly, and it was able to establish printing presses. However, an attempt to organise an assembly of the committees in Saigon was broken up by Chief of Police Duong Bach Mai with the support of the PCI.

When a French expeditionary force arrived, the LCI organised a workers' militia, but its appeal for workers to arm themselves was not widely taken up. Ho Chi Minh of the PCI signed an agreement with the French, and most of the leaders of the LCI were executed or had disappeared by early 1946.

== See also ==
- La Lutte
- Tạ Thu Thâu
- Ngo Van
- Trotskyism in Vietnam
