= 1935 Cochinchinese parliamentary election =

Colonial Council elections were held in French Cochinchina on 3 March 1935.

== Electoral system ==
The 24 members of the Cochinchina Colonial Council consisted of ten members elected by French citizens, ten by Vietnamese who were classed as French subjects, two by the Chamber of Commerce and two by the Chamber of Agriculture.

== Results ==
Amongst the Vietnamese electorate, the La Lutte group received 17% of the vote, although they failed to win a seat.
