= Phan Văn Trường =

Vietnamese activist

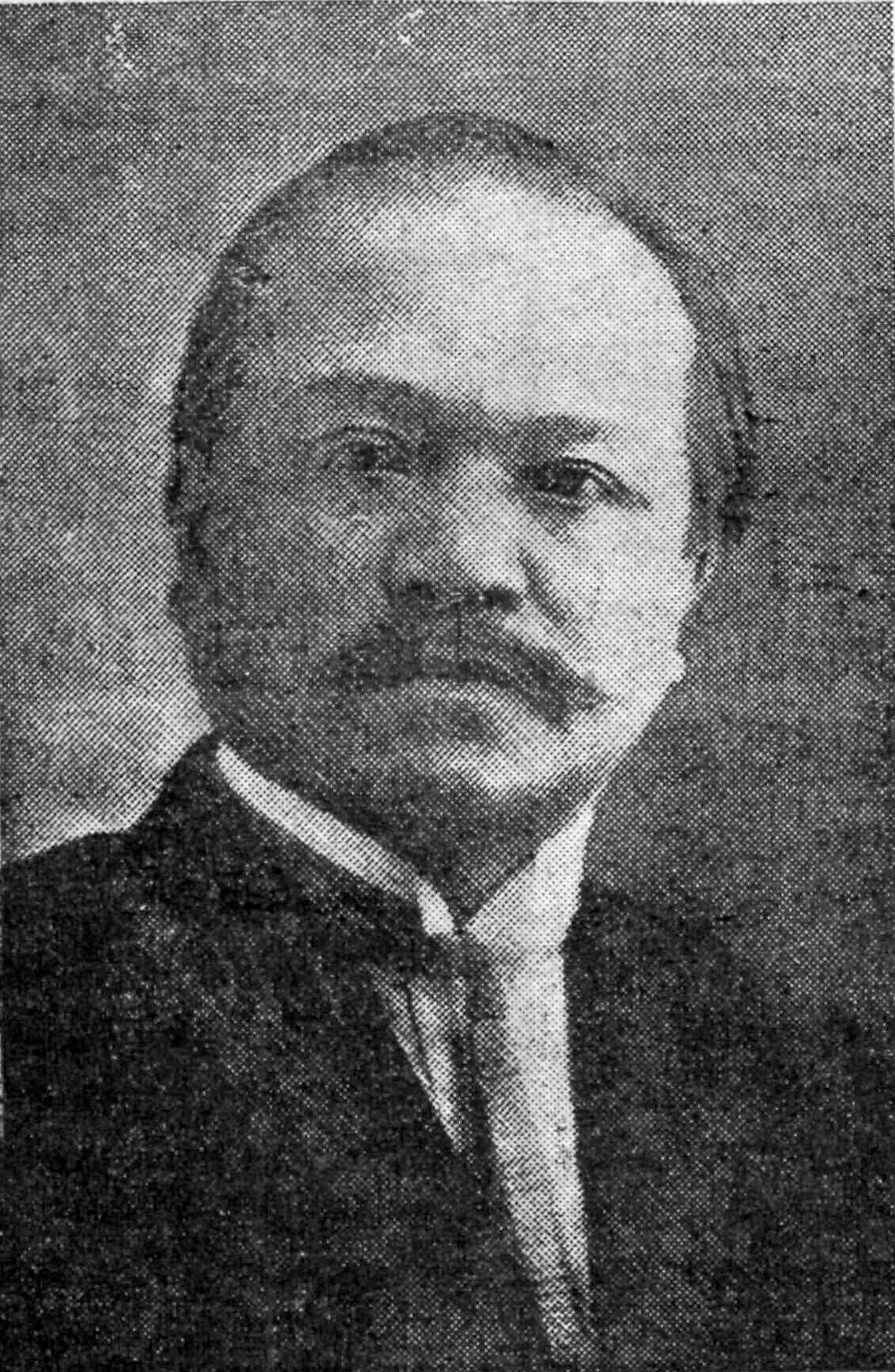
- Born: 25 September 1876; Hanoi, Đại Nam
- Died: 23 April 1933 (aged 56); Hanoi, Tonkin

Phan Văn Trường (1876–1933) was an early 20th century Vietnamese nationalist, the first Juris Doctor of Vietnam and a key actor of cultural modernization in Vietnam in the decade 1920–1930. Along with his four compatriots Phan Châu Trinh, Nguyễn Tất Thành, Nguyễn An Ninh and Nguyễn Thế Truyền, Phan Văn Trường formed the group known as the Ngũ Long (Five Dragons, French: Cinq Dragons) during his stay in France from 1908 to 1925.

Phan Văn Trường was born on 25 September 1876 in Đông Ngạc commune, Từ Liêm district, Hà Nội, in a family of academics. From the young age, he was well known for his intelligence and diligence, he started by studying Chinese characters, then switched to studying Chữ quốc ngữ and the French language.

After graduating from the School of Interpretation in Hà Nội, Phan served as an interpreter at the Bắc Kỳ Governor’s Office. In 1908, he moved to France to study law at the Sorbonne in Paris. Upon defending his doctoral thesis, he entered legal practice, becoming the first Vietnamese lawyer and the first Vietnamese recipient of a Juris Doctor degree.

In 1919, persuaded by Nguyển Tất Thành, Phan wrote the petition "Revendications du Peuple Annamite" (English: "Claims of the Annamite People"; Vietnamese: "Yêu sách của nhân dân An Nam"), which was then sent to the Versailles Conference under the name Nguyễn Ái Quốc, later used by Nguyễn as one of his many aliases.

In 1931, he went to Saigon and met Nguyễn An Ninh again with the intention of continuing the struggle against the French colonizers on the front of the public press. However, Phan's wish did not come true. In 1933, he returned to Hà Nội to visit his family. During his stay there, he suddenly fell ill and died at home on 23 April 1933.
