= 1939 Cochinchinese parliamentary election =

Colonial Council elections were held in French Cochinchina on 16 April 1939.

== Electoral system ==
The 24 members of the Cochinchina Colonial Council consisted of ten members elected by French citizens, ten by Vietnamese who were classed as French subjects, two by the Chamber of Commerce and two by the Chamber of Agriculture. Most of the population did not qualify for the franchise.

== Results ==
Amongst the Vietnamese electorate, three Trotskyist candidates Tạ Thu Thâu, Trần Văn Thạch and Phan Văn Hùm received around 80% of the vote; the pro-French Indochinese Constitutionalist Party received 15% and Stalinists candidates 1%.

== Aftermath ==
The defeat of the Stalinism led to the Indochinese Communist Party splitting, with Dương Bạch Mai continuing to lead the official faction of the party and Nguyễn Văn Tạo heading a breakaway. The central issue of contention between the Stalinist and Trotskyist factions was whether the proletariat or the peasantry should lead the revolution in Indochina. Despite their electoral victory, the Trotskyists soon declined in popularity due to infighting and their support for a class which had not yet been fully developed in the region.
