= Nguyễn An Ninh =

Vietnamese revolutionary (1900–1943)

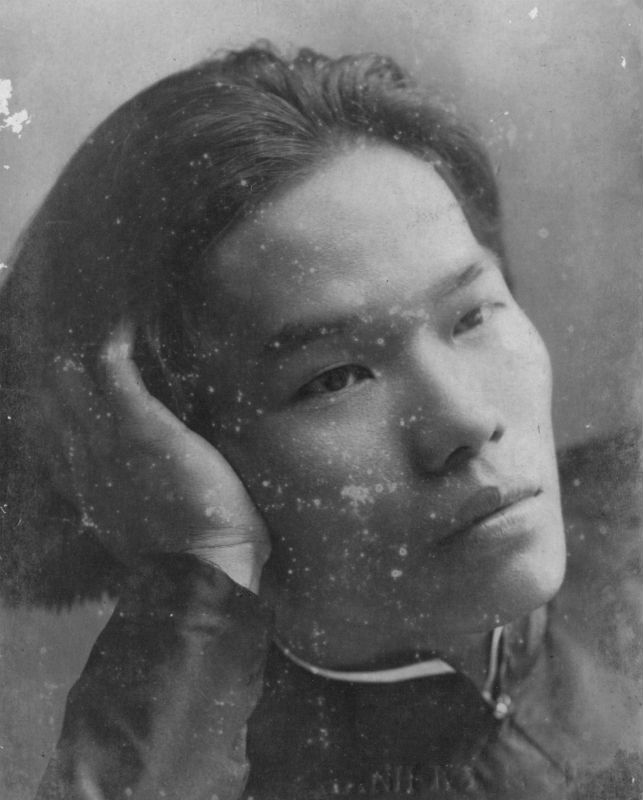
- Born: 6 September 1900; Cần Giuộc district, Chợ Lớn Province, French Cochinchina
- Died: 14 August 1943 (aged 42); Côn Đảo Prison, Poulo Condore, French Cochinchina
- Occupations: writer, activist, revolutionary, anarchist

Nguyễn An Ninh (6 September 1900 – 14 August 1943) was a Vietnamese revolutionary, political journalist and publicist in French colonial Cochinchina (Southern Vietnam). An independent and charismatic figure, Ninh was able to conciliate between different anti-colonial factions including, for a period in the 1930s, between the Communist Party of Nguyễn Ái Quốc (aka "Ho Chi Minh", then in exile) and its left opposition— the Trotskyists who looked to Tạ Thu Thâu. Ninh died in the French penal colony of Pulo Condore (now is Côn Đảo) at age 42. He is recognised by the Socialist Republic of Vietnam as a Revolutionary Martyr.

== Early political celebrity ==
Nguyễn An Ninh was born on 6 September 1900, in Long Thượng commune, Cần Giuộc district, Chợ Lớn province (now part of Tây Ninh province), Cochinchina, a direct rule colony incorporated with four protectorates in the French Indochinese Union. His father Nguyễn An Khương, from Quán Tre, Hóc Môn district, Gia Định province (now part of Trung Mỹ Tây former District 12, Ho Chi Minh City), "a middling landowner, who preferred to think of himself as a country scholar", was a supporter of the Duy Tân hội or Đông Du (Association for Modernization, 1904–1912) reform movement. As a result, in 1908, he was excluded from Saigon and banned from journalism. Nguyen An Ninh received a French education. In 1918, this took him to Paris. He graduated from the Sorbonne with a degree in Law age 20.

While in Paris, Nguyễn An Ninh joined the Groupe des Patriotes Annamites (The Group of Vietnamese Patriots) that included Phan Châu Trinh, Phan Văn Trường, Nguyễn Thế Truyền and the future Ho Chi Minh (then under the name Nguyễn Tất Thành). Together the "Five Dragons" (Ngũ Long) indicted French colonial policy in the socialist press (an indictment that, on a return to France in 1923, Ninh developed and published as La France en Indochine). In 1919 the group tried to present delegates to the Versailles Peace conference with an eight-point programme for colonial self-determination.

Within months of a final return from France, Nguyễn An Ninh was arrested in a suppression of La Cloche Fêlée. As the editor-in-chief, reporter, type-setter and even street seller, he had been producing the paper intermittently in Saigon since December 1923. Its appeals had drawn thousands of young workers and students to protest debt peonage and deportations, and to demand freedom of press, education and assembly.

Ninh was summoned before the governor, Maurice Cognacq, who told him:

This country has no need for intellectuals. This country is very simple. If you want to be intellectual, get the hell out of here, go to Moscow, you'll know that the seeds you want to sow in this country can never sprout.

Ninh's arrest on 21 March 1926, coincided with the return from France of Bui Quang Chieu, the leader of the moderate-nationalist Constitutionalist Party. Crowds accompanying Chieu through the streets of Saigon chanted "Free Nguyễn An Ninh". It was also the day news was received of the death of Phan Châu Trinh. One of the Five Dragons, Phan Châu Trinh was a celebrated political convict. The result, on 4 April, was an unprecedented demonstration against the government. Seventy thousand paraded with Phan Châu Trinh's cortege. When Ninh's 18-month sentence was announced on 24 April 1926, students and school children in Saigon and the region deserted their classes en masse. More than a thousand of them were expelled.

== La Cloche Fêlée and the "Nguyen An Ninh Secret Society" ==
Nguyễn An Ninh published La Cloche Fêlée (the title from the poem by Baudelaire, The Cracked Bell) as a "Journal for the Propagation of French Ideas." It carried a speech, delivered on his return to Saigon in October 1923, in which Ninh exhorted young people to "leave the homes of your fathers" and embrace the world. Only then could they shake off the "suffocating ignorance" in which they were trapped by obscurantism. Ngo Van recalls the message as being that while Vietnam's oppression comes from France, so does the spirit of liberation. Ninh published his own translation of Jean-Jacques Rousseau's The Social Contract under the title The Ideal of Annamese Youth (Cao-vọng cúa bọn thanh niên An-Nam. Dân uóc).'

Not confining himself to France, however, Ninh found inspiration in the words of figures as diverse as the Indian poet Rabindranath Tagore—"those who take pleasure in dominating foreign races abdicate little by little their own liberty"—and the assassinated German foreign minister Walther Rathenau—"He who wants to rule above slaves is himself an escaped slave; the only man who is free is the one who is willing to be followed by freemen and willingly serves free men". In March 1926, following the death of Phan Chau Trinh and Ninh's arrest, La Cloche Fêlée began serialisation of The Communist Manifesto.

Nguyễn An Ninh published his paper in French because of the government's print restrictions on Vietnamese, and it was with regular pleas to his readers to translate for their "brothers". Following the path of Tagore and of Congress leader Mohandas Gandhi in India, he saw himself as employing the ideals of the Enlightenment to both reappraise and reawaken the indigenous culture. This was not a task he believed could be entrusted to the narrow urban and literate classes alone.

In 1929 more than a hundred peasants and day labourers were convicted in Saigon for membership of "Nguyễn An Ninh Secret Society" (otherwise known as Thanh niên Cao vọng Đảng, the Youth Salvation Party). According to the Sûreté it had been an insurrectionist conspiracy that promised the initiated "some kind of agrarian socialism." The Trotskyist militant and later chronicler of the times Ngo Van concluded that the "Society" was largely a figment of "denunciations and torture-induced confessions."

Early in 1928, Nguyễn An Ninh, who was fascinated by the growing popular reach of Caodaism had begun travelling by bicycle from village to village, his head shaved like a Buddhist monk. He was in the company of Pham Văn Chieu, a young working-class figure from the Saigon underworld, and the later Trotskyist leader Phan Văn Hùm who had written him a fan letter in 1924. The only concrete piece of advice Ninh is said to have given is for people to withhold their taxes, with the suggestion—in the recollection of one village school teacher—that within three years the colonialists would either capitulate or face a popular uprising. While Ninh himself avoided creating a centralized command structure, Van believes that some of his comrades tried to organise in his wake and that other underground groups used the name of Nguyễn An Ninh to rally support".

In a serialised and widely circulated account of their shared experience of Saigon's Maison Centrale, the "Colonial Bastille," Phan Văn Hùm eulogised his friend as a man who, forsaking government offers of land and position, had struck "terror into the hearts of corrupt, servile sycophants" and shaken "the corner of the southern sky".

Other, present-day pro-CPV sources have Nguyễn An Ninh returning to his mission the countryside after his release in 1931. He was accompanied by Nguyễn Văn Trân, a young Communist Party member he had known from Paris, and it was with the understanding that his Society was not a political party, but rather a mass movement from which there could, and should, be recruitment to the Communist Party. Ninh, according to these sources, declined to join the party himself only because he believed himself of greater service to the movement as a non-party "patriotic intellectual".

While Ninh was in prison, Phan Văn Hùm appears to have maintained contact with many of his erstwhile supporters in the countryside, and after the rural protests of 1930 to have led them into the Communist Party.

When years later, in 1936, Ngo Van encountered Nguyễn An Ninh again in Saigon's Maison Central and asked him about his "agrarian programme," Ngo Van recalls that Ninh "raised his eyes [over the prison walls] toward the tamarind trees and began to sing Auprès de ma blonde [a traditional French ballad]: "In my father's garden . . . All the birds in the world come to build their nests". He later thrust into Ngo Van's hands Céline's "explosive" Voyage au bout de la nuit (Journey to the End of the Night).

== La Lutte and the Democratic Front ==
Between 1930 and the end of 1932, the colonial authorities responded to widespread rural and labour unrest with dragnet arrests. More than 12,000 political prisoners were taken, of whom 7,000 were sent to the penal colonies. The French shattered the structure of every anti-colonial faction including (at a time when most their leading cadres were already in prison or, with Ho chi Minh, abroad) the Indochinese Communist Party (PCI). Gathering around the independent figure of Nguyễn An Ninh, several of surviving representatives decided to bury their differences and together oppose the government in the Saigon municipal elections of April–May 1933.

The group, which included Nguyễn Văn Tạo of the PCI, the Trotskyist Tạ Thu Thâu, the anarchist Trinh Hung Ngau, and the independent nationalist Tran Van Thach, put forward a common "Workers's List" (So lao dong) and briefly published the paper La Lutte (The Struggle) to rally support for it. In spite of the restricted franchise, two of this Struggle group were elected (although denied their seats). Ngo Van identifies Nguyễn An Ninh as having been "the real linchpin." At the largest of the hustings he was elected to chair by acclaim.

In 1934, Nguyễn An Ninh helped revive the La Lutte collaboration. Ninh and the Lutteurs "focused squarely on the plight of the urban poor, the workers and peasant labourers." However, from 1936 the lengthening shadow of the Moscow Trials (obliging the Party loyalists to denounce their Trotskyist colleagues as "twin brothers of fascism"), and the failure of the Communist Party-supported Popular Front government in France to deliver on promises of colonial reform, ensured a split. Tạ Thu Thâu and Nguyễn Văn Tạo came together for the last time in the April 1937 city council elections, both being elected.

In the wake of renewed labour unrest, with Tạ Thu Thâu and Nguyen Van Tao, Nguyễn An Ninh's was soon back in prison. When released early in 1939, but still under house arrest, he was persuaded to let his name go forward with Nguyễn Văn Tạo, and other Party cadres, as a Democratic Front candidate in the April 1939 Cochinchina Colonial Council elections. Together with the Constitutionalist slate, his list was defeated by the now wholly Trotskyist lutteurs. The La Lutte Workers and Peasants platform was revolutionary (radical land redistribution and workers' control) but in a restricted income-tax payer election the key was the Trotskyists' opposition to the French Indochina defence levy that the Communist Party, in the spirit of Franco-Soviet accord, had felt obliged to support.

== Final incarceration and death ==
When on 23 August 1939, Franco-Soviet relations were finally sundered by the Molotov–Ribbentrop Pact and war followed two weeks later, "sedition" of every stripe and faction was repressed. Nguyễn An Ninh was sentenced to 5 years in prison and 10 years exile.

Nguyễn An Ninh died in the Côn Đảo island prison, Poulo Condore, on 14 August 1943. It is possible that his jailers had decided his fate. They may have regarded him as a figure the Japanese occupiers would seek to use politically.

== Commemoration ==
Thirty-seven years after his death, on 1 August 1980, the Vietnamese Socialist Republic posthumously conferred upon Nguyễn An Ninh the title “Revolutionary Martyr.” In what is now Ho Chi Minh City, Ninh is memorialised in the Nguyễn An Ninh High school and in Nguyễn An Ninh Street, a central thoroughfare familiar to the city's growing number of foreign visitors. A museum dedicated to Nguyễn An Ninh was opened on the site of his parental home northwest of Ho Chi Minh City, in District 12 In 2002.

== See also ==
- Ngo Van
- Phan Văn Hùm

== Bibliography ==
- Ho Tai, Hue-Tam (1992). Radicalism and the Origins of the Vietnamese Revolution. Cambridge: Harvard University Press. ISBN 0674746120. LCCN 91-16930. OCLC 464029400.
- Peycam, Philippe (2012). The Birth of Vietnamese Political Journalism: Saigon, 1916-1930. New York: Columbia University Press. ISBN 978-0-231-15850-3. LCCN 2011027412.
- Van, Ngo (2010). Ken Knabb; Hélène Fleury (eds.). In the crossfire: adventures of a Vietnamese revolutionary. Translated by Hélène Fleury. Oakland: AK Press. ISBN 9781849350136. OCLC 877726806.
- Zinoman, Peter (2001). The Colonial Bastille: A History of Imprisonment in Vietnam, 1862-1940. University of California Press. ISBN 0-520-22412-4. LCCN 00-31690.
