= Phan Văn Chánh =

Vietnamese activist

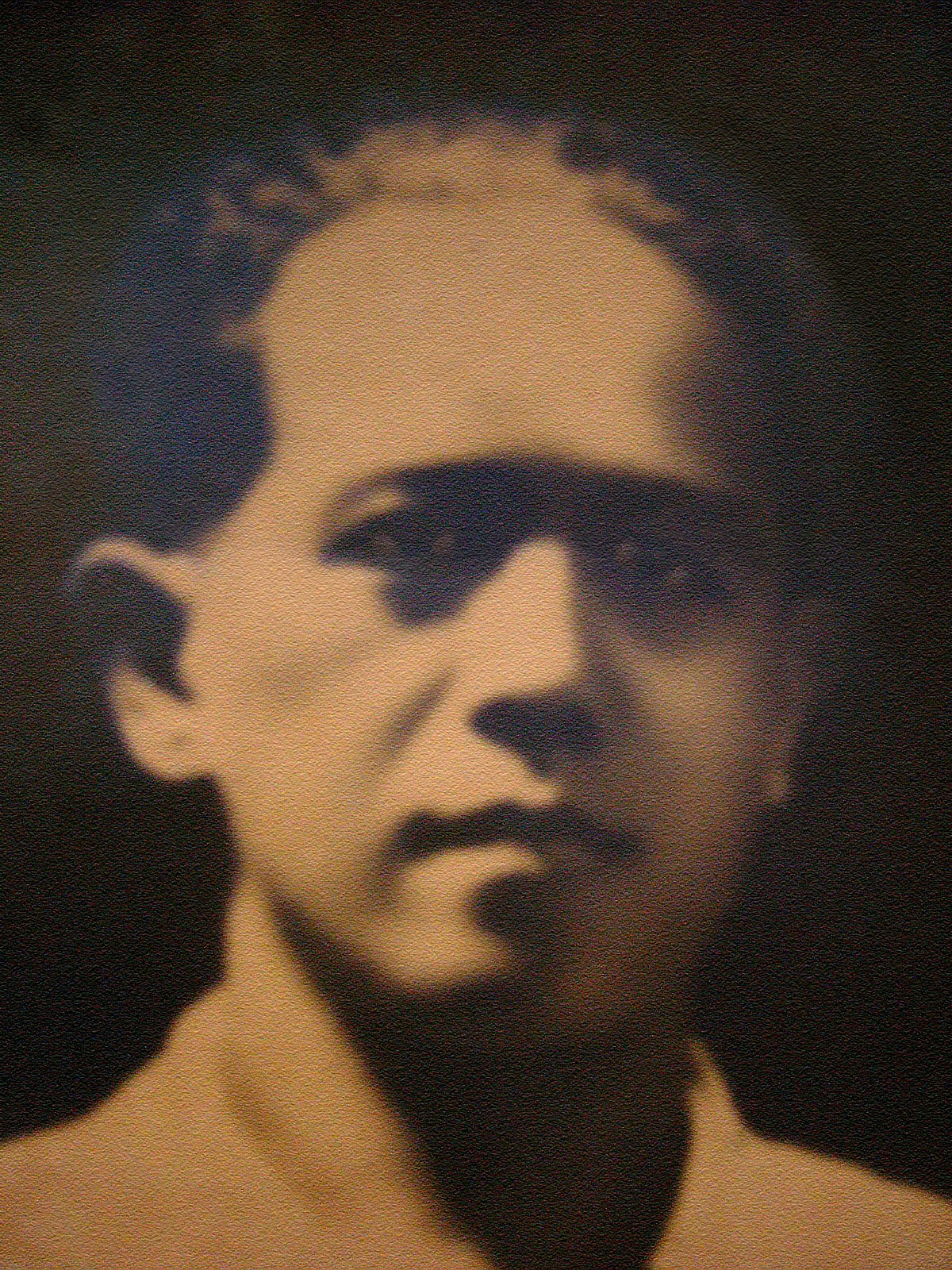
Phan Van Chanh

Phan Văn Chánh (1906–1945) was a Vietnamese activist and Trotskyist.

== Biography ==
He was born in xã Bình Trước, Quận Đức Tu, old Biên Hòa Province into a wealthy family. He completed his secondary education at Chasseloup-Laubat College, Saigon, and then left for France to continue his education at the Faculty of Medicine of Paris. He collaborated with Trần Văn Thạch on the Journal des Étudiants Annamites and then was active in the Annamite Independence Party with Ta Thu Thau. He followed Tạ Thu Thâu in joining the Trotskyist Left Opposition in 1930. He was one of the 19 students expelled from France on 30 May 1930 for protesting the Yen Bai executions.

In Saigon, he taught in private schools and participated in the formation of the Indochinese Left Opposition (Ta Doi Lap). He was arrested in the roundup of communists on 8 August 1932 and received a four-year suspended sentence on 1 May 1933.

He was a stalwart of the Tranh Đấu (La Lutte) group and followed Ta Thu Thau after the split of June 1937. He stood on the La Lutte platform in the Saigon Colonial Council elections of April 1939. Arrested on 13 July 1939 when the government moved to declare the communist movement illegal, he was sentenced to three years imprisonment on 16 May 1940, with a five-year residence ban and a decade long loss of civil rights.

He served his time on the notorious prison island of Poulo Condore. During the events of 1945, Chanh served with the Tranh Đấu (La Lutte) group and was apprehended by the Vietminh and executed in October 1945. Many of his fellow Trotskyists, including Phan Văn Hùm (died 1946), died or disappeared shortly thereafter.
