= Ngo Van =

Vietnamese revolutionary

- Born: Ngô Văn Xuyết; 1913; Tân Lộ near Saigon, French Indochina
- Died: 2005 (aged 91–92); Paris, France
- Notable work: Viêt-nam 1920-1945, révolution et contre-révolution sous la domination coloniale (1996). Au Pays de la cloche fêlée, tribulations d’un Cochinchinoisà l’époque coloniale (2000)
- Movement: La Lutte/Tranh Dau (The Struggle), Trang Cau De Tu Dang (International Communist League, Vietnam), Union Ouvrière Internationale (International Workers' Association, France)

Ngô Văn Xuyết (1913 – 2005), alias Ngô Văn, was a Vietnamese revolutionary who chronicled labour and peasant insurrections caught "in the crossfire" between the colonial French and the Indochinese Communist Party of Nguyễn Ái Quốc (Ho Chi Minh). As a Trotskyist militant in the 1930s, Ngô Văn helped organise Saigon's waterfront and factories in defiance of the Party's "Moscow line" which, in the name of anti-fascism, sought to engage indigenous employers and landowners in an anti-Japanese nationalist front. When, after 1945, further challenges to the Party met with a policy of targeted assassination, Ngô Văn went into exile. In Paris, experiences shared with anarchist and Poumista refugees from the Spanish Civil War suggested "new radical perspectives." Drawn into the Council Communist circles of Maximilien Rubel and Henri Simon, Ngô Văn "permanently distanced" himself from the model of "the so-called workers's party."

== Trotskyist militant, Saigon, 1927–1940 ==
Ngô Văn left his village at the age of 14 to work in a metallurgical works in Saigon. He soon became involved in labour strikes and in demonstrations in support of freedom of assembly, of the press, and of education. A high-school-educated workmate provided him introduction to French literature, to the journalism of Nguyen An Ninh, and, eventually, to Ho Huu Tuong. Once considered "the theoretician of the Vietnamese [Communist Party] contingent in Moscow", Ho Huu Tuong had become a leading light in the Left-Opposition group Thang Muoi (October). Opposed to the general line of the Communist Party of Vietnam, and in particular to the nationalist-front policy of Nguyễn Ái Quốc, Thang Muoi called on activists to "bond" with rank-and-file urban workers and build a "mass-based" party.

In 1936, Ngô Văn parted with comrades willing to continue cooperation with "Stalinists" around the weekly, La Lutte and in the presentation of a common "Workers' List" in Saigon municipal, and Cochinchina council, elections. With Ho Huu Tuong he joined the League of Internationalist Communists for the Construction of the Fourth International (formed by Lu Sanh Hanh in 1935). This produced a weekly Le Militant (which carried Lenin's Testament with its warnings about Stalin, and Trotsky's polemics against the strategy of Popular Front) and an agitational bulletin, Thay Tho (Wage and Salary Workers).

Committed to the notorious Maison Centrale in Saigon, Ngô Văn was disturbed by the case of Nguyen Trung Nguyet, the longest serving female prisoner. As understood by Van, Nguyet had been implicated (alongside Tôn Đức Thắng, who was later to be first president of a unified Vietnam) in the Party's execution of a young comrade. His "crime" was a love affair that compromised "total devotion to the revolution." For Văn it was an illustration of "how readily a party of professional revolutionaries can end up imposing authoritarian control over every aspect of life."

Between arrests, Ngô Văn engaged in support of the major dock and railway strikes of 1937. Judging by the frequency of the warnings in the clandestine Communist press against Trotskyism the influence of the oppositionists in the labour unrest was "considerable" if not "preponderant." He also produced pamphlets in Vietnamese condemning the Moscow Trials and exploring the dynamics of syndicalism.

In April 1939, he was back out on the streets, able to celebrate what a later reviewer of his history described as "the only instance prior to 1945 in which the politics of 'permanent revolution' oriented to worker and peasant opposition to colonialism won out, however ephemerally, against Stalinist 'stage theory' in a public arena." In elections to the colonial Cochinchina Council a "United Workers and Peasants" slate, led by Ta Thu Thau of the now wholly Trotskyist La Lutte grouping, triumphed alike over the Communist Party's Democratic Front and the "bourgeois" Constitutionalists. As understood by Van, however, the partisans of the Fourth International succeeded at the ballot box for reasons relatively mundane. The election had been primarily a tax protest, a rejection of the new French Indochina defence levy that the Communist Party, in the spirit of Franco-Soviet accord, had felt obliged to support. Governor General Brévié indeed had praise for the defeated the Stalinists who, in contrast to the Trotskyists, "understood that the interests of the Annamese masses bring them closer to France."

The political opening against the Communist Party, such as it was, closed with the Hitler-Stalin Pact of 23 August 1939. Moscow ordered a return to direct confrontation with the French. The Party obliged, triggering a peasant revolt in south. to whose bloody suppression Ngô Văn, having been exiled to the Mekong Delta, was witness.

== The September 1945 Saigon Uprising ==
Opportunity for open political struggle returned with the formal surrender of the occupying Japanese in August 1945. But events then moved rapidly to demonstrate the Trotskyists' relative isolation in Saigon. Văn and his comrades had little intimacy with developments to the north where, in Hanoi, on 2 September 1945, Hồ Chí Minh proclaimed the Democratic Republic of Vietnam. The lack of connection was made "painfully clear" when they found they had "no way of finding out what was happening" following reports that in the Hongai-Camphai coal region north of Haiphong 30,000 workers (under the indifferent gaze of the defeated Japanese) had elected councils to run mines, public services and transport, and were applying the principle of equal pay. (Months later they received a report that the "Democratic Republic" had—in the name of national unity—crushed the commune).

In Saigon itself, the initiative lay with the Communist-front Viet-Minh supported, Ngô Văn records, by the leadership of the Jeunesse d'Avant-Garde/Thanh Nien Tienphong (Vanguard Youth, a "formidable" movement that had contributed to civil defence and policing under Japanese). Only when, for the declared purpose of disarming the Japanese, the Viet-Minh accommodated the landing and strategic positioning of the Allies did rival political forces turn out in force. The brutality of the French restoration triggered a general uprising.

Under the slogan "Land to the Peasants! Factories to the workers!," Ngô Văn and his comrades joined residents in popular councils and in a "Workers' Militia". In the "internationalist spirit of the League," streetcar workers had broken with their union, General Confederation of Labour (renamed by the Viet Minh "Workers for National Salvation"). Refusing the yellow star of the Viet-Minh, they mustered under the unadorned red flag "of their own class emancipation." Like other independent formations, these were soon caught in the crossfire as the Viet-Minh returned to engage the French.

As Ngô Văn's Militia group fell back from the city, they reached out to local peasants: "we explained to them that we were fighting not only to 'drive out the French' but also [drawing the distinction with the Viet-Minh] to get rid of the indigenous landlords, to end the forced labour in the rice fields, and to liberate the coolies." But for a timely rescue, Ngô Văn, captured on reconnaissance, would likely have been executed by Viet-Minh alongside a surveyor (and La Lutte supporter) condemned for having helped peasants divide expropriated land.

"Harassed by the Sûreté in the city and denied refuge in a countryside dominated by the two terrors, the French and the Viet-Minh," and suffering from tuberculosis, in the spring of 1948 Ngô Văn took the decision to board a merchant ship bound for Marseille.

== "New radical perspectives" from exile ==
In France, Ngô Văn found "new allies in the factories and elsewhere, among French people, colonised people, and refugees from the Spanish Civil War of 1936-1939--anarchists and Poumistas [veterans of the POUM, The Workers' Party of Marxist Unification] who had gone through a parallel experience to ours. In Vietnam, as in Spain, we had been engaged in a simultaneous battle on two fronts: against a reactionary power and against a Stalinist party struggling for power." To these "encounters" Ngô Văn credits "new radical perspectives." These "permanently distanced" him from "Bolshevism-Leninism-Trotskyism." With his fellow exile Nguyễn Văn Nâm he was persuaded that once in power "so-called 'workers' parties'" form "the nucleus of a new ruling class and bring about nothing more than a new system of exploitation." Visiting Tito's Yugoslavia in 1950, his scepticism was again confirmed. The Yugoslav League of Communists denied him permission to visit their "re-education camps".

Ngô Văn's first political home in France was the Union Ouvrière Internationale [International Workers's Association]. Having split with the Trotskyist Parti Communist Internationale over their "defence of the USSR" as a "degenerated workers’ state," the UOI supported Văn in taking issue with his exile community. "Despite the assassination of almost all their comrades in Vietnam by Ho Chi Minh's hired thugs," the Vietnamese Trotskyists had adopted the slogan "Defend the government of Ho Chi Minh against the attacks of imperialism"

In "Prolétaires et paysans, retournez vos fusils!" [Workers and Peasants, Turn Your Guns in the Other Direction!], an opinion piece appearing under the name Dong Vu in the Trotskyist paper Tieng Tho (Workers' Voice) (October 30, 1951), Ngô Văn argued that if Ho Chi Minh won out over the French-puppet Bảo Đại government, workers and peasants would simply have changed masters. Those with guns in their hands should fight for their own emancipation, following the example of the Russian workers, peasants and soldiers who formed soviets in 1917, or the German worker's and soldiers' councils of 1918–1919.

In 1952 Ngô Văn and his partner Sophie Moen joined a less formal group around the "marxologist" Maximilien Rubel. Rubel inspired a re-reading of Marx as a "theoretician of anarchism". He also introduced Văn to other of Marx's contemporaries, such as Soren Kierkegaard and Friedrich Nietzsche, who had espoused "new sets of values, new reasons for living, new norms for acting, a new ethic." Văn recalled that Nietzsche had strongly influenced Nguyen An Ninh, the radical journalist and publicist whose celebrity had first awakened his own political consciousness in the late 1920s (and who, in a brief encounter in the Maison Centrale had shared with Văn Céline's "explosive" Voyage au bout de la nuit [Journey to the End of the Night]).

In 1958 Ngô Văn's study and discussion circle—which later adopted the name Council Communist Group—began to cooperate closely with the Henri Simon in the ICO (Informations et correspondances ouvrières). The project sought to bring together workers in different companies who "no longer had any confidence in the traditional working-class organisations." A distinct nucleus, Regroupement Interenterprises, was set up, and Văn was one of those involved. The meetings organised were small, usually between 10 and 20, but they slowly began to grow in the run-up to 1968.

== Paris, May 1968 ==
In a wave of such labour actions across France, in May 1968 Ngô Văn joined in the occupation of his workplace, the Jeumont-Schneider factory in electrical engineering plant in Paris. From the outset he noted that CGT (Confédération Générale du Travail) union officials (who formed the factory's Communist Party cell) sought to keep the workers isolated within the factory. They turned away students and other curious visitors. When the officials insisted that the red flag workers had mounted on the gate be paired with the tricolour, Văn took it as a signal that he would, again, be witness to a sacrifice of class interests to national party-political ambition. It was a concern he believed was borne out by the unions' acceptance of relatively minor concessions in the national Grenelle Agreements.

Văn acknowledges, however, that in his factory the discussion of more radical demands was desultory at best. Worker self-management was mentioned but his colleagues "thought themselves incapable of carrying out such a task effectively." The nature of the modern economy was such that democratic management presented "a worldwide problem," not something they believed "could not be carried out within an individual factory, or even within a single country." In general "the workers had little to say."

== Writing and reflections ==
Ngô Văn retired in 1978. He devoted his remaining years to researching and relaying the history of popular struggle in Vietnam, reflecting upon his own experience, and memorialising his fallen friends and comrades. He also took time to study at the École des Hautes Etudes, earning a doctorate in the history of religions.

He covered the years of his own engagement both in a substantial history, Việt Nam 1920-1945, révolution et contre-révolution sous la domination coloniale [Vietnam 1920–1945, Revolution and Counterrevolution under Colonial Domination] (1996), and in a personal memoir, Au pays de la cloche fêlée : Tribulations d'un cochinchinois à l'époque coloniale [In the Land of the Cracked Bell: Tribulations of a south Vietnamese in the Colonial Era] (2000). Together with notes for a second autobiographical volume, this is published in English as In the Crossfire: Adventures of a Vietnamese Revolutionary (2010).

Le joueur de flute et l'oncle Ho - Vietnam 1945-2005 [The Flute Player and Uncle Ho: Vietnam 1945–2005] (2005) covers the decades since his exile. It is the story of the Communist Party's consolidation of power in "the long war" ("The victory of the 'heroic little people'—what victory?") and, with reference to strikes and other signs of revolt, of the opening of the new economy to foreign capital.

Ngô Văn's last completed work, written in 2004 when he was 91 years old, was an introduction to the history of peasant revolts in China, with special emphasis on their Taoist origins and utopian and libertarian inspirations. With Hélène Fleury he also brought out a collection of Vietnamese folk tales for children.

In 1997, for the first time since 1948, Ngô Văn was able to visit his homeland. But for all the evidence he would have witnessed of a preceding half century of social and economic change, the now Socialist Republic of Vietnam remained for Ngô Văn, first and foremost, a society in which producers "still do not enjoy collective ownership of the means of production, nor [have] time for reflection, nor the possibility of making their own decisions, nor means of expression." Asked why he so "stubbornly" persisted in bearing witness to past history, Văn replied "Because the world hasn't changed."

Ngo Van has been cited, since 2021, as an inspiration for Mèo Mun (Ebony Cat) a group describing themselves as "an anarchist collective working to make anarchist materials and ideas more accessible to a Vietnamese audience, together with providing an analysis of social struggles from a Vietnamese anarchist lens".

== Family ==
In his published work, Ngô Văn said very little about his family. His mentions being visited in police detention in June 1940 by his "partner, with a toddler in her arms". This unidentified woman and her child did not accompany him into exile. He records his distress in 1956 at being hospitalised for "tubercular pleurisy" just months after he succeeded in bringing over from Saigon his twelve-year-old son Da. He describes the child as having white hairs on his head, the legacy of a "terrifying night he had spent during the previous year (1955), bullets whistling over his head as he crouched under the bed during a battle (in his straw-hut neighborhood) between the Bình Xuyên pirates and Ngo Dinh Diem's mercenaries".

Hélène Fleury, who accompanied Văn to Vietnam in 1997, records her friend as having had two other children (not, it seems, including the toddler from 1940): Do (born 1932) who, as one of the "boat people", made it to France in the late 1970s, and a daughter Oanh (born 1935) whom he met for the first time in more than fifty years on that 1997 visit.

== Published works ==
- 1937--Vụ án Moscow, nhà xuất bản Chống Trào Lưu, Saigon, (pamphlet in Vietnamese denouncing the Moscow Trials)
- 1976--Divination, magie et politique dans la Chine ancienne [Divination, magic and politics in ancient China] (Paris, PUF, 1976)
- 1995--Revolutionaries They Could Not Break (London, Index Books)
- 1996--Viêt-nam 1920-1945, révolution et contre-révolution sous la domination coloniale (Paris, L’insomniaque; Nautilus, 2000)
- 1997--Une amitié, une lutte, 1954–1996. (Paris, L’insomniaque) (An account of Van's political work, and friendship, with Maximilien Rubel)
- 2000--Việt Nam 1920-1945, Cách mạng và phản cách mạng thời đô hộ thực dân(Paris, L’insomniaque) (Vietnamese edition of Viêt-nam 1920-1945)
- 2000--Au Pays de la cloche fêlée, tribulations d’un Cochinchinoisà l’époque coloniale, [In the country of the cracked bell: the trials of a Cochinchinese in the colonial age] (Paris, L’insomniaque). (Van's autobiography, covering the period up to 1945)
- 2001--Contes d'autrefois du Viêt-nam/Chuyện đời xưa xứ Việt, [Vietnamese Tales from Bygone Days] with Hélène Fleury, (Paris) (Vietnamese folk tales for children in a bilingual French-Vietnamese edition)
- 2004--Utopie antique et guerre des paysans en Chine, [Ancient utopias and peasant war in China] (Paris, Chat qui Pêche)
- 2005--Le Joueur de flûte et Hô chi Minh, Viêt-nam 1945-2005, [Vietnam 1945-2000: the flute player and Uncle Ho] (Paris-Méditerranée).
- 2005--Au Pays d’Héloïse (Paris, L’insomniaque)
- 2005--In the Crossfire: Adventures of a Vietnamese Revolutionary (Oakland, AK Press) (Translation of Au pays de la cloche with Ngo Van's notes for a second autobiographical volume).

== See also ==
- La Lutte
- Tạ Thu Thâu
- Nguyen An Ninh
- Phan Văn Hùm
- Trotskyism in Vietnam
