= Phan Văn Hùm =

Vietnamese journalist, philosopher

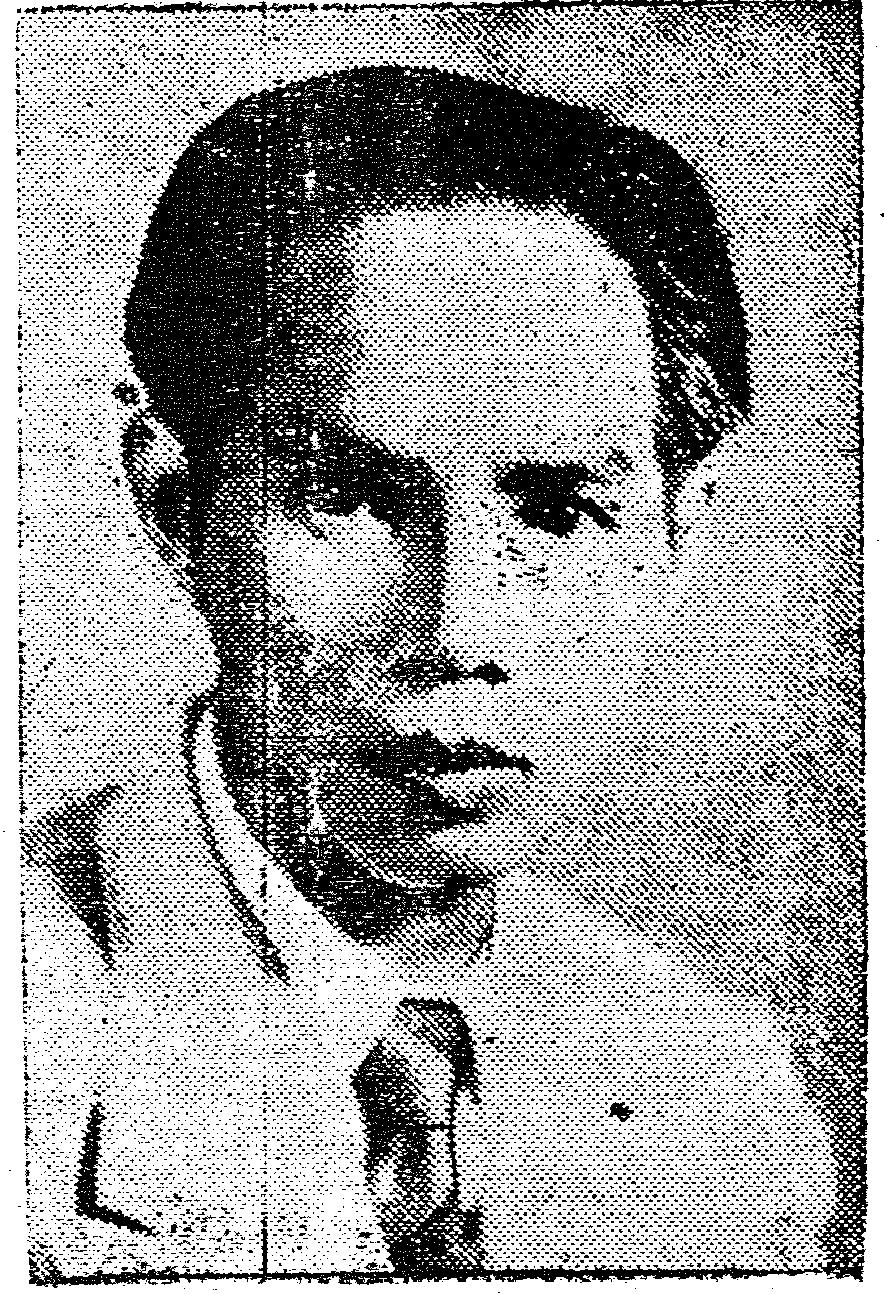
- Hùm in 1939
- Born: 1902
- Died: 1946 (aged 43–44)
- Political party: Communist League (Lien Minh Cong San Doan), The Fourth Internationalist Party (Trang Cau De Tu Dang)

Phan Văn Hùm (9 April 1902 – 1946) was a Vietnamese journalist, philosopher and revolutionary in French colonial Cochinchina who, from 1930, participated in the Trotskyist left opposition to the Communist Party of Nguyen Ai Quoc (Ho Chi Minh).

Phan Văn Hùm first became a public figure when in 1929 his account of imprisonment with Nguyen An Ninh for agrarian agitation was circulated among patriotic youth. As a student in Paris In 1930, influenced by Tạ Thu Thâu's left opposition to the united front policies of the Comintern he joined the Trotskyist Communist League. After a period of uneasy co-operation with “Stalinists” on the Saigon paper La Lutte, with Thâu he triumphed over the Communists in the 1939 elections to the Cochinchina Colonial Council on a platform that opposed a policy of defense collaboration with the French. After the surrender of the occupying Japanese in August 1945, Hum participated in the independent Trotskyist resistance to a French restoration. Taken prisoner by the Communist Viet Minh, he was executed in early 1946.

== Early life ==
Phan Văn Hùm was born in the village of An Thanh, French Cochinchina (southern Vietnam). His father was an educated Buddhist and a small landowner. In the early 1920s he worked as a technician in Huế where he was a frequent visitor to veteran nationalist and anti-colonial campaigner Phan Bội Châu, then under house arrest as the founder of “Vietnamese Restoration League” (Việt Nam Quang Phục Hội).

In Saigon Phan Văn Hùm befriended the charismatic publicist Nguyen An Ninh. Together they travelled the countryside, spreading ideas of liberation among the peasants. They were arrested and confined to Saigon's Maison Centrale, the "Colonial Bastille". Banned as a book, his account of their ordeal was serialised in the paper Than Chung and widely circulated among patriotic youth.

== With the Left Opposition in France ==
In September 1929 he left for France where, from the Sorbonne University, he obtained a bachelor's and master's degree in philosophy. In Paris he met Tạ Thu Thâu who had clashed with Moscow-aligned Communists from the very outset of his political engagement in Paris. Accusing the French Communist Party of infiltrating his Annamite Independence Party (A Nam Độc lập Đảng), Thâu argued that if “the oppressed of the colonies" were to secure their "place in the sun," they would have to "unite against European imperialism--against Red imperialism as well as White." Following a public protest in front of the Élysée Palace over the execution of the leaders of the Yên Bái mutiny on 22 May 1930, Hùm went underground with Hồ Hữu Tường. In July 1930 they formed an Indochinese Group within the Communist League (Lien Minh Cong San Doan), the French section of the International Left Opposition whose members were systematically expelled by the Comintern.

== La Lutte and the Workers and Peasants Platform ==
In 1933 Phan Văn Hùm was reunited with Tạ Thu Thâu and Hồ Hữu Tường in Saigon. For three years, until countermanded by central party directives, local cadre of the then Indochinese Communist Party cooperated with Hùm and Thâu on the paper La Lutte (The Struggle). In the April 1939 Colonial Council elections, Hùm was on a “Workers an Peasants” slate with Thâu that triumphed over both the Communist “Democratic Front" and the bourgeois Constitutionalists on a platform that called for radical labor an agrarian reform and opposed defense collaboration with the French. For having campaigned against war loans and war taxes, they were both sentenced to five years' hard labor and ten-year restricted residence. Hùm spent three years in the Côn Đảo island prison, Poulo Condore (where his old prison comrade Nguyen An Ninh died in 1943), from 1939 to 1942.

== Interest in the Hòa Hảo movement ==
Following his release, and while still under house arrest, Phan Văn Hùm had two works of philosophy published in Hanoi: Phat Giao Triet Hoc (1942) on the populist interpretation of Buddhist philosophy in the syncretic Hòa Hảo movement; and Vuong Duong Minh, Than The Va Hoc Thuyet (1944) on the 16th century Chinese master Wang Yangming whose neo-Confucianism proposed both an innate human understanding of good and evil, and action as the source of knowledge.

There are conflicting accounts of Phan Văn Hùm's relationship to the Hòa Hảo "saint" Huỳnh Phú Sổ (1920–1947) whose method of practicing Buddhism "without monks and nuns, temples, and bells” had gained as many as two million adherents in the villages and provincial towns of the south. The Communist Nguyễn Văn Trân credited Hum with drafting the social-democratic platform of the Hòa Hảo's political party Dan Xa. Both Hum and Tạ Thu Thâu were interested in meeting with Huỳnh Phú Sổ and in understanding the strength of his movement in the countryside where their own organization was weak. After the Japanese surrender in August 1945, now called the International Communist League (Vietnam) (ICL), or less formally as The Fourth Internationalist Party (Trăng Câu Đệ Tứ Đảng), it appeared alongside the Hòa Hảo in demonstrations in Saigon calling for resistance to a return of the French. They did so, however, independently of the United National Front in which the Hòa Hảo and other participants—the Cao Dai, the nationalist VNQDĐ, the Vanguard Youth, the Public Service Workers Union—were grouped. The Fourth Internationalists paraded under their own flags and slogans: Land to the Peasants, Factories to the Workers, and All Power to People's Committees (the popular councils that had formed spontaneously in the city).

== Rejection of the Vietminh, and execution ==
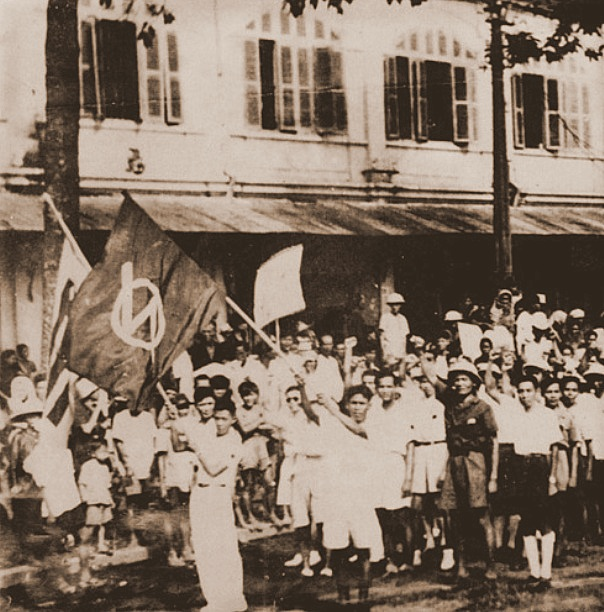
The Fourth Internationalists in Saigon, 21 August 1945.

Recognising the relative weakness of their popular base, the new self-proclaimed Vietminh provisional government in Saigon offered positions to leading figures in a number of southern political organizations including to Phan Văn Hùm. Hum refused. In mid September he learned of the Viet Minh's arrest of Tạ Thu Thâu.

Under growing pressure from the British-assisted French forces, the situation in the Saigon was deteriorating, disrupting publication of Hùm's newspaper Tranh Dau (which had reached a print run of 20,000), and forcing the Fourth Internationalists' worker militia, and other fighting units, out of the city.

According to his comrade Ngo Van, who in later exile was to be the chief witness and historian of the Trotskyist movement in Vietnam, Phan Văn Hùm survived the massacre of his comrades in October 1945 at the Thị Nghè bridge by French and British troops. Later, in the same month, he was hunted down by the Vietminh security led by Dương Bạch Mai, with whom he had originally collaborated on La Lutte, and, meeting the same fate as Thâu, was executed early in 1946.

== Mai Huỳnh Hoa, his wife ==
Phan Văn Hùm was survived by his second wife, the writer and poet Mai Huỳnh Hoa. Herself a former inmate of the Maison Centrale, Hoa, like her father who died in prison in 1933, was a member of the Communist Party. She first met Hùm when at a meeting he was addressing she stood up and cried "Down with the Trotskyist Phan Văn Hùm". They were married in 1936.

In 1957, she helped prepare a second edition of his book on the works of her grandfather, the anti-colonial writer and poet Nguyễn Đình Chiểu (Nỗi lòng Đồ Chiểu originally published in 1938), for which she wrote a dedication. Mai Huỳnh Hoa died in Ho Chi Minh City in 1987 at the age of 77.

== List of Works ==
- Ngoi Tu Kham Lon (In the Central Prison), Saigon 1929
- May Duong To (A Few Poems)
- Nỗi lòng Đồ Chiểu (Do Chieu's Heart), Saigon: Bốn Phương, 1938. Second Edition, Saigon: Tân Việt, 1957.
- Sa Da Du Tu (Journal of a Wanderer: Impressions of Life and Travel in France), published in Than Chung. Bien Chung Phap Pho Thong (Dialectics Made Easy), Saigon 1939.
- Nguyen Phi Hoanh (pseudonym), Tolstoy, Saigon 1939.
- Phật giáo triết học (Buddhist philosophy), Hanoi 1942.
- Vuong Duong Minh, Than The Va Hoc Thuyet (The Life and Teaching of Wang Yangming), Hanoi 1944.
- Ngồi tù Khám Lớn, lần 2, (Second prison memoir). Dân tộc, 1957

== See also ==
- La Lutte
- Tạ Thu Thâu
- Ngo Van
- Nguyen An Ninh
- Trotskyism in Vietnam
