= Tạ Thu Thâu =

Vietnamese Trotskyist politician (1906–1945)

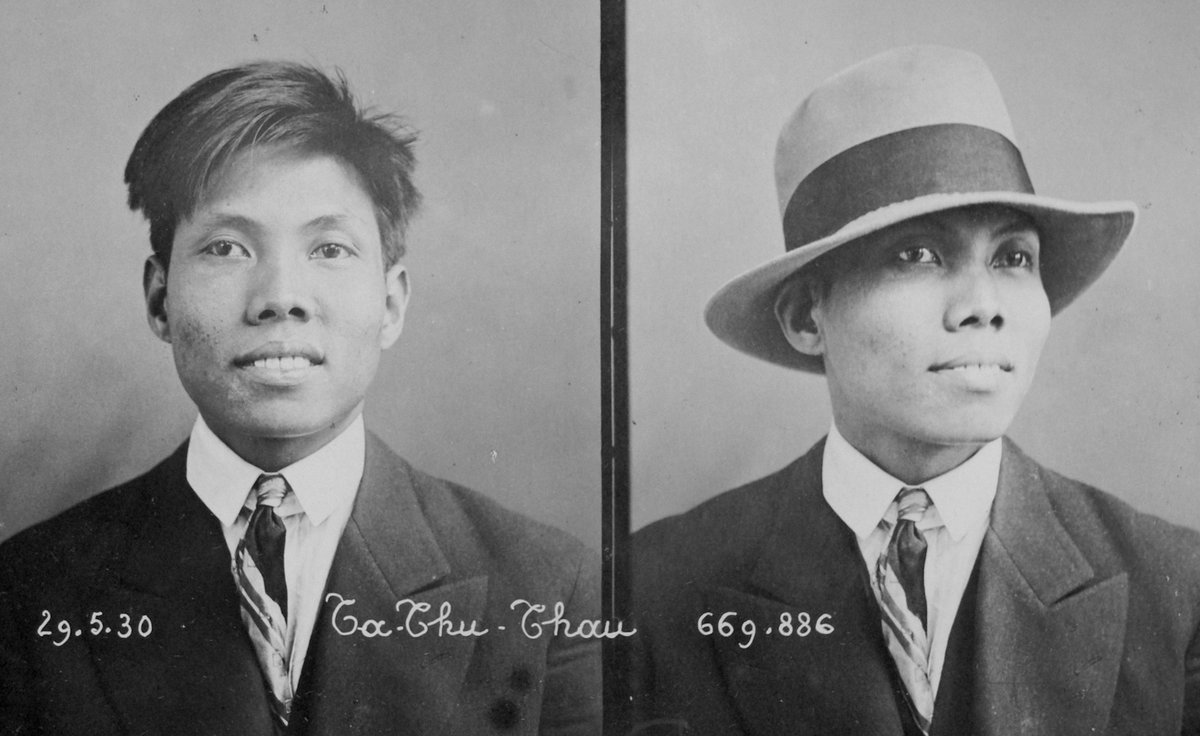
- 1930 Paris police mug shot following protests against suppression of the VNQDĐ
- Born: May 5, 1906; Tân Bình, An Phú, French Cochinchina
- Died: September 7, 1945 (aged 39); Quảng Ngãi, French Annam
- Education: University of Paris
- Political party: Jeune Annam; Annamite Independence Party; La Lutte Front, International Communist League (Vietnam)
- Movement: Indochinese Communist Union (Đông Dương Cộng Sản); International Communist League Vietnam (Trang Cau De Tu Dang)

Tạ Thu Thâu (1906–1945) in the 1930s was the principal representative of Trotskyism in Vietnam and, in colonial Cochinchina, of left opposition to the Indochinese Communist Party (PCI) of Nguyen Ai Quoc (Ho Chi Minh). He joined the Left Opposition to the United Front policy of the Comintern as a student in Paris in the late 1920s. After a period of uneasy co-operation with "Stalinists" on the Saigon paper La Lutte, he triumphed over the Communists in the 1939 elections to the Cochinchina Colonial Council on a platform that called for radical land reform and workers' control, and for opposition to defense collaboration with the French authorities. He was executed by the Stalinist Viet Minh in September 1945.

== Early life ==
Tạ Thu Thâu was born in 1906 in Tân Bình, An Phú (near Long Xuyên) in French Cochinchina (southern Vietnam), the fourth child of a large and very poor family: his father was an itinerant carpenter. As a scholar student he attended a high school in Saigon, and (with a Baccalauréat Franco-Indigène) in 1925 began work as a teacher. In 1926, at age 20 he joined the Jeune Annam (Young Annam), and wrote for the nationalist newspaper Annam. In April Thâu took part in a week of protests attended by thousands of workers, and by students, sparked by the death, after 18 years penal servitude, of the veteran nationalist Phan Châu Trinh and by the arrest of Nguyễn An Ninh.

Nguyễn An Ninh was an important influence on Thâu. From the pages of his journal La Cloche Fêlée (from Baudelaire's Broken Bell), Ninh exhorted young people to "leave the home of their fathers." Only then could they hope to shake off the "suffocating ignorance" in which they were trapped by obscurantism: "our oppression comes from France, but so does the spirit of liberation." In 1927 Thâu sailed for France, where he enrolled in the Faculty of Science, University of Paris.

== "Nationalism or Socialism", Paris, 1927–1930 ==
Flag of the Struggle Group.

Tạ Thu Thâu clashed with Moscow-aligned Communists from the very outset of his political engagement in Paris as a member, and from early 1928 as the leader, of the Annamite Independence Party (An Nam Độc lập Đảng). He accused "salaried Annamites of the Colonial Commission of the French Communist Party" of infiltrating his party in order to turn members into "puppets carrying out the Communist Party's dictates." If the oppressed of the colonies were to secure their "place in the sun," Thâu argued they would have to "unite against European imperialism — against Red imperialism as well as White."

In 1929, after attending a conference of the Anti-Imperialist World Congress in Frankfurt, Germany, and contact with the Communist Party dissidents Alfred Rosmer and Daniel Guérin and with the philosopher and human rights activist, Felicien Challey, Thâu expressed his view of the Indo-Chinese revolution in the Left Opposition La Vérité. The revolution would not follow the precedent set by the Third International in China, where support for a broad nationalist front, the Kuomintang, had led Communists "to the graveyard" (the Shanghai massacre of 1927). The "'Sun Yat-sen-ist' synthesis of democracy, nationalism and socialism" is "a kind of nationalist mysticism." It obscures "the concrete class relationships, and the real, organic liaison between the indigenous bourgeoisie and French imperialism," in the light of which the call for independence is "mechanical and formalistic." "A revolution based on the organisation of the proletarian and peasant masses is the only one capable of liberating the colonies ... The question of independence must be bound up with that of the proletarian socialist revolution."

Arrested during a public protest in front of the Élysée Palace over the execution of the leaders of the Yên Bái mutiny on 22 May 1930, Thâu and eighteen of his compatriots were deported back to Saigon.

== "The Struggle" in Saigon, 1930–1939 ==
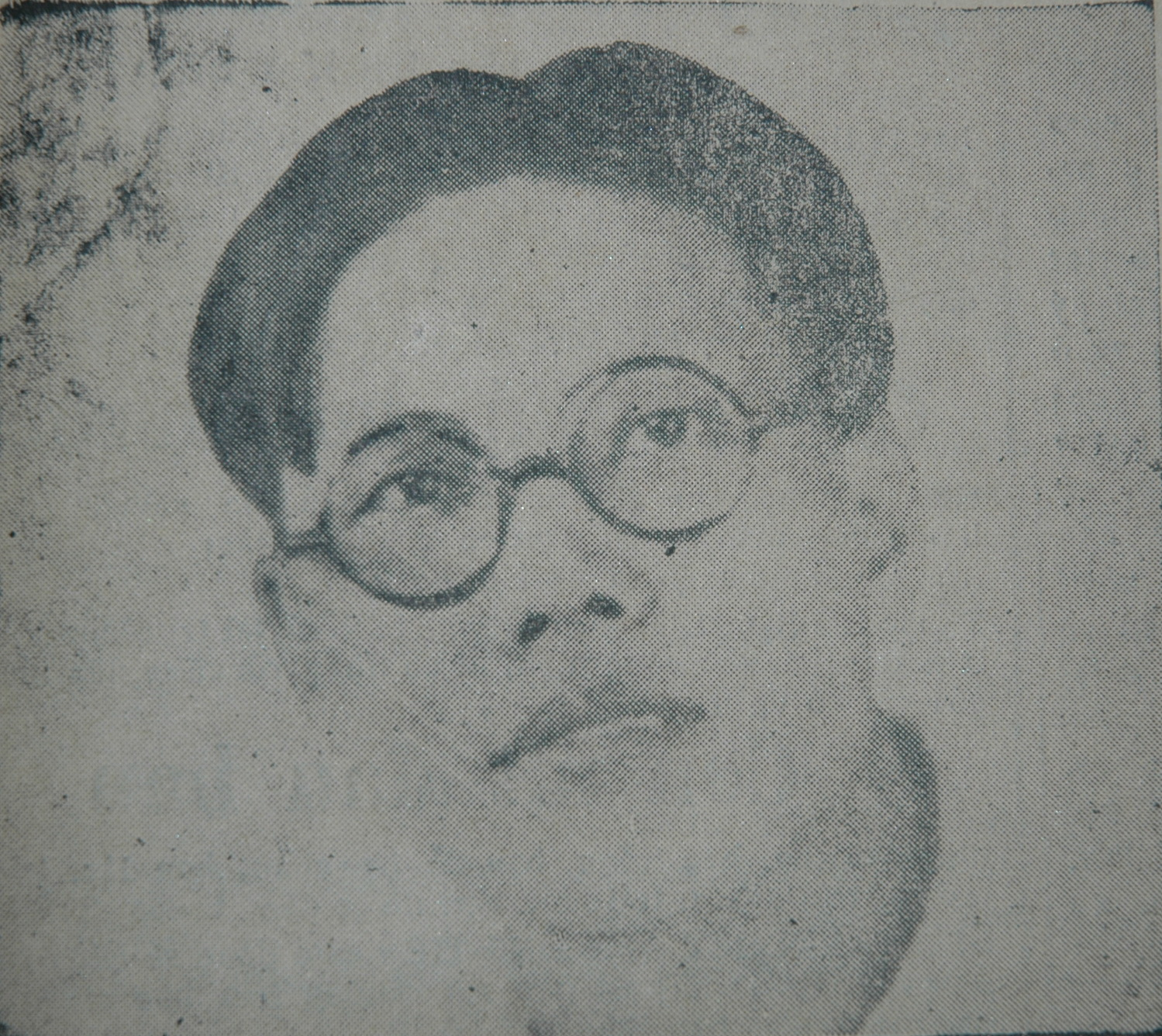
Thâu in 1939

Tạ Thu Thâu's first attempt to challenge to the Indochinese Communist Party (PCI) from the left, the Indochinese Communism Union (Đông Dương Cộng Sản), was broken up in 1932 with his arrest. On his release early in 1933 Thâu decided to explore the limited opportunities for "legal" political activity. To the surprise of some of his comrades, for this purpose he was willing to work not only with independent nationalists but also with "Stalinists"— with members of the PCI.

The focus for cooperation was the spring 1933 elections Saigon municipal elections. Thâu and his associates put forward a "Workers List" and briefly published a newspaper (in French to get around the political restrictions on Vietnamese), La Lutte (The Struggle) to rally support for it. In spite of the restricted franchise, two of this Struggle group were elected (although denied their seats), the independent nationalist (later Trotskyist) Tran Van Thach and Nguyễn Văn Tạo, previously a member of the French Communist Party (PCF), now in the PCI.

In the autumn of 1934, partly through the intercession of Nguyễn An Ninh, the Struggle Group was revived with La Lutte being published as a regular weekly. In March 1935 Cochinchina Council elections their united "Workers List" won no seats but 17 percent of the vote.

Those unwilling to accept the accommodations involved in this unique Trotskyist-Stalinist entente rallied to the League of Internationalist Communists for the Construction of the Fourth International (Chanh Doan Cong San Quoc Te Chu Nghia-Phai Tan Thanh De Tu Quoc). The diehards included Ngô Văn (Ngô Văn Xuyết), who in later exile was to memorialise Tạ Thu Thâu in his history of the revolutionary struggle.

Tạ Thu Thâu and Nguyễn Văn Tạo came together for the last time in the April 1937 city council elections, both being elected. Together with the lengthening shadow of the Moscow Trials, their growing disagreements over the new PCF-supported Popular Front government in France ensured a split.

The leftward shift in the French National Assembly in Thâu's view had brought little. He and his comrades continued to be arrested during labour strikes, and preparations for a popular congress in response to the government's promise of colonial consultation had been suppressed. Colonial Minister Marius Moutet, a Socialist commented that he had sought "a wide consultation with all elements of the popular [will]," but with "Trotskyist-Communists intervening in the villages to menace and intimidate the peasant part of the population, taking all authority from the public officials," the necessary "formula" had not been found.

Thâu's motion attacking the Popular Front for betraying the promises of reforms in the colonies was rejected by the PCI faction, and the Stalinists withdrew from La Lutte. They established their own paper, L'Avant-garde, in which they denounced their erstwhile Trotskyist colleagues as "the twin brothers of fascism."

With La Lutte now as Tranh Dau (Struggle) an openly Trotskyist paper, Thâu and Phan Văn Hùm led a "Workers' and Peasants' Slate" into victory over both the Constitutionalists and the PCI's Democratic Front in the April 1939 Cochinchina Council elections. The lutteurs programme had been openly revolutionary (radical land redistribution, workers control). But the key was their opposition to the "national defence levy" that the Communist Party, in the spirit of Franco-Soviet accord, had felt obliged to support.

On May 20, 1939, Governor-General Jules Brévié (who set the election results aside) wrote to Colonial Minister Georges Mandel: "the Trotskyists under the leadership of Tạ Thu Thâu, want to take advantage of a possible war in order to win total liberation." The Stalinists, on the other hand, are "following the position of the Communist Party in France" and "will thus be loyal if war breaks out."

Such as it was, the political opening against the PCI closed with the Hitler-Stalin Pact of August 23, 1939. Moscow ordered a return to direct confrontation with the French. In Cochinchina the Party in 1940 obliged, triggering a disastrous peasant revolt.

Belatedly, the Luttuers, then numbering then perhaps 3000, and the smaller number of Octobrists united as the official section of the newly constituted Fourth International. They formed the International Communist League (Vietnam) (ICL), or less formally as The Fourth Internationalist Party (Trang Cau De Tu Dang).

With the outbreak of World War II, Communists of every stripe were repressed. The French law of September 26, 1939, which legally dissolved the French Communist Party, was applied in Indochina to Stalinists and Trotskyists alike. Tạ Thu Thâu was arrested and was incarcerated in the penal colony Poulo-Condore. He was held until March 1945 when the occupying Japanese finally dispensed with the Vichy French administration.

== Northern mission, arrest and execution, 1945 ==
While Tạ Thu Thâu was in Poulo-Condore, in the north Nguyen Ai Quoc, now known as Hồ Chí Minh, was laying the foundations for national power. He created the Viet Minh ("Viet Nam doc lap dong minh hoi"—-Vietnam Independence League). A purportedly broad nationalist front, the Viet Minh remained (in contrast to the Chinese Kuomintang) entirely a creature of the Party (even after this was formally dissolved in 1945). Subordinating all other social interests, the objective was "To expel the French and Japanese fascists and to establish the complete independence of Vietnam."

On his release from Poulo-Condore, Ngô Văn records that Thâu and a small group secretly travelled north to Tonkin. They encountered a fraternal group publishing a bulletin, Chien Dau (Combat), and were received into clandestine meetings of mine workers and peasants. But famine was rife. On May 14, Thâu managed to get an appeal published in the daily Saigon. He called on his "brothers in Cochinchina to eat only what you need to stay alive and to send here everything you possibly can, immediately. His young comrade, Ðỗ Bá Thế, drew on their northern mission in his 1960 novel, Thím Bảy giỏi ("The Good Auntie").

In August, hunted and pursued as "anti-worker elements" by the Viet Minh, Thâu and his group turned south. On September 14, at Quang Ngai, he fell into their hands. There were reports that Thau was put on trial before a "people’s court", but that on the personal instruction of Hồ, Tran Van Giau, of the southern Viet Minh command, overrode the court when it refused to convict Thâu, and had him summarily executed. His fate was shared at Quang Ngai by large numbers of Caodaists, independent nationalists and their families. Interviewed in 1989, Giau, who allowed that he had known Thâu since their days in Paris and been helped by him when on the run from the Sûreté in Saigon, refused to answer questions about the fate of Trotskyists at the hand of the Viet Minh and denied any connection to Thâu's death.

In September, during the general uprising in Saigon against the restoration of the French, Thâu's reconvened La Lutte grouping formed a workers' militia. Of these, Ngô Văn records two hundred alone being "massacred" by the French, on October 3, at the Thị Nghè bridge. Caught between the French and the Viet Minh, there were few survivors.

A year later in Paris, Daniel Guerin asked Ho Chi Minh about Tạ Thu Thâu's fate. Hồ Chí Minh had replied, "with unfeigned emotion," that "Thâu was a great patriot and we mourn him", but then a moment later added in a steady voice, "All those who do not follow the line which I have laid down will be broken."

== Commemoration in South Vietnam ==
Up until the capitulation of the South Vietnamese regime to the People's Army of Vietnam and the National Liberation Front in April 1975, streets in a number of southern towns and cities were named in honor of Tạ Thu Thâu. From March 22, 1955, these included the street leading to the East Gate of Bến Thành Market in old Saigon/Ho Chi Minh City, which now bears the name of the "patriotic intellectual" Lưu Văn Lang. There is, however, a small street in District 9 of the city, near the Thu Duc intersection, that continues as đường Tạ Thu Thâu.

The year before the fall of Saigon, in January 1974 a biography of Tạ Thu Thâu, Nhà cách mạng Tạ Thu Thâu, 1906-1945 (The Revolutionary Tạ Thu Thâu), was published in the city written by Phương Lan.

Thâu had a wife who died in Paris in 2010 at the age of 101.

== See also ==
- Trotskyism in Vietnam
- International Communist League (Vietnam)
- Ngo Van
- Nguyen An Ninh
- Phan Văn Hùm
