= Civil conflicts in Vietnam (1945–1949) =

Civil war in Vietnam, 1945–1949
- Part of the aftermath of World War II and the Indochina wars
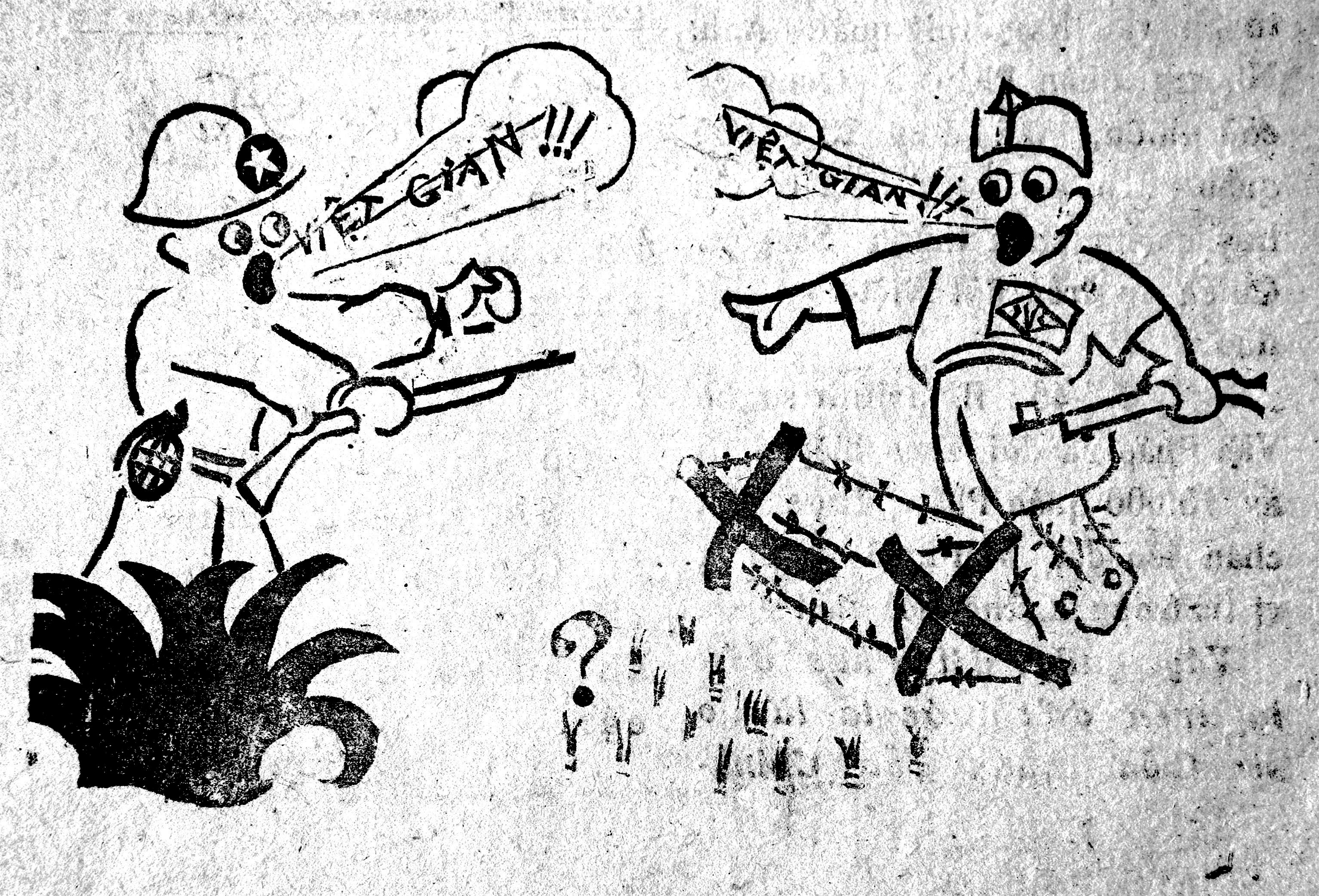
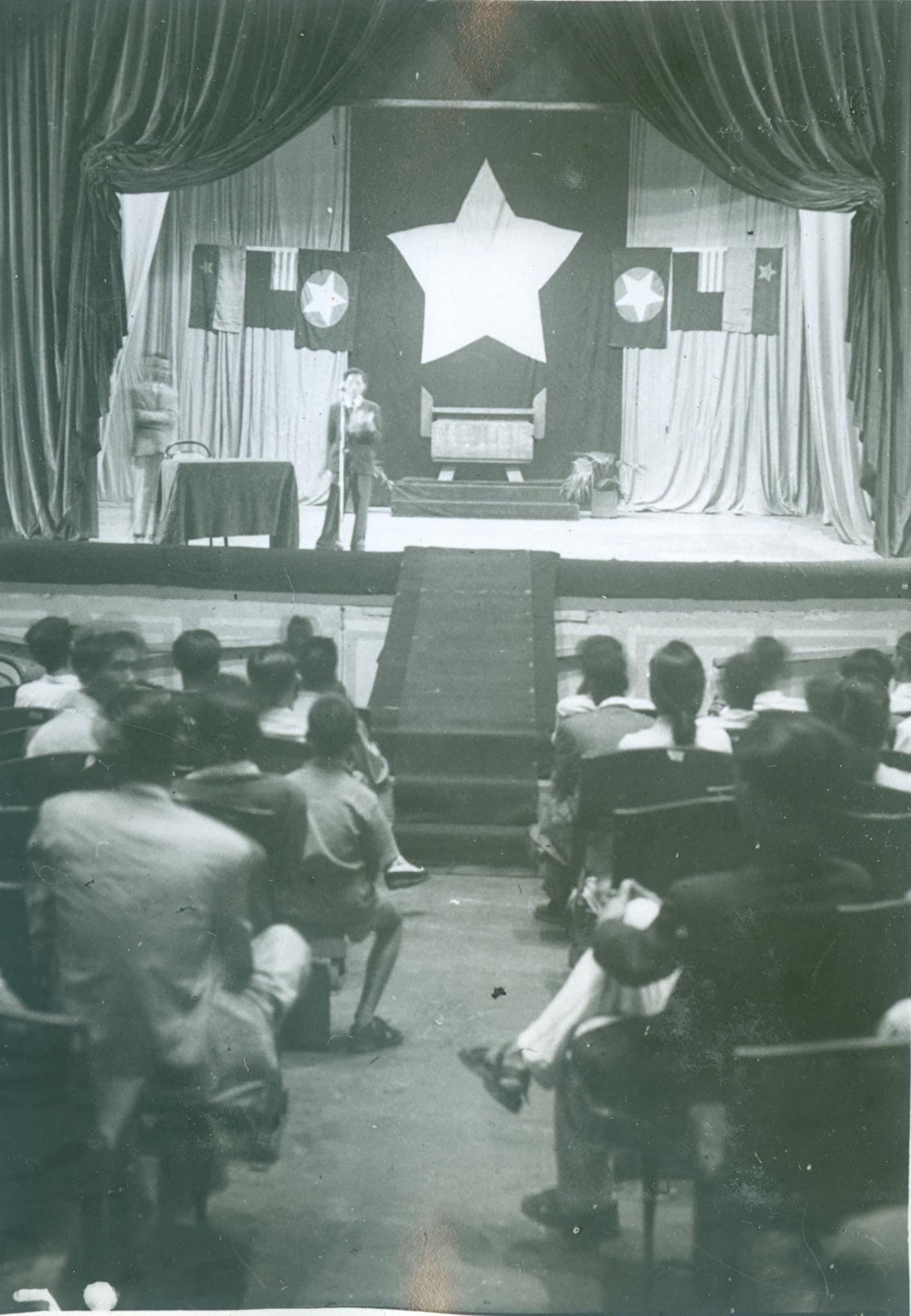
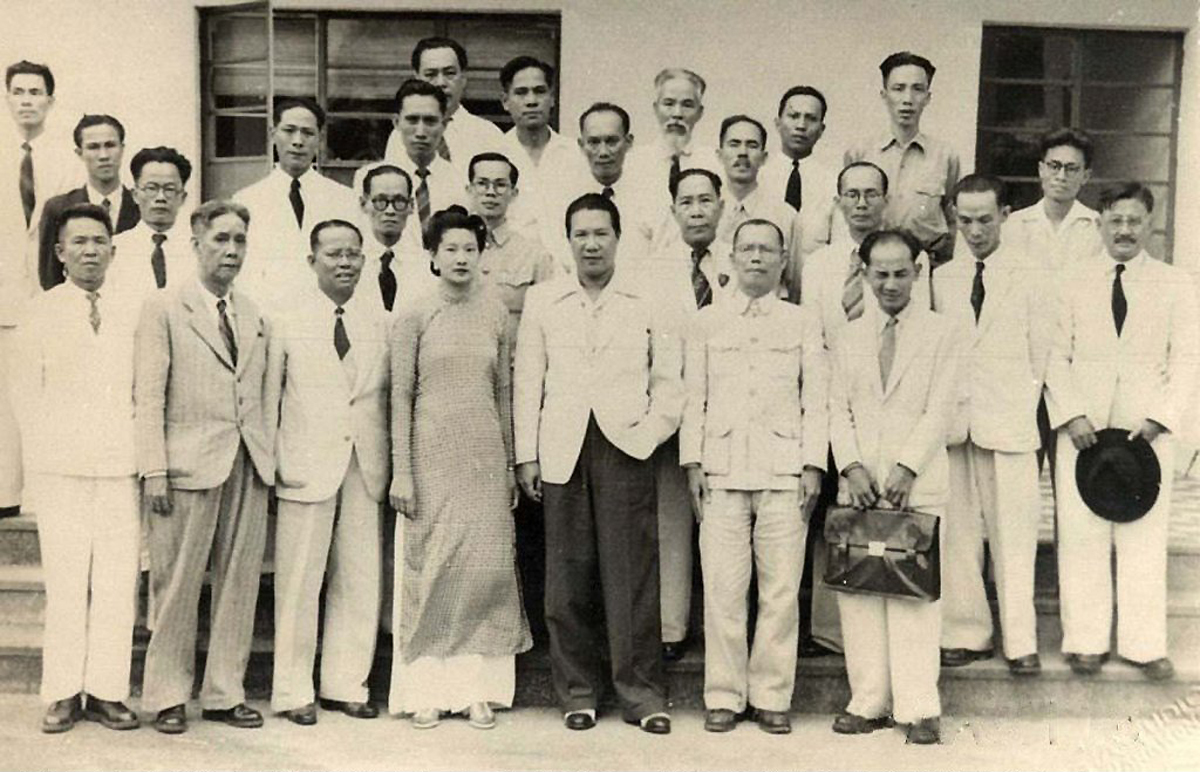
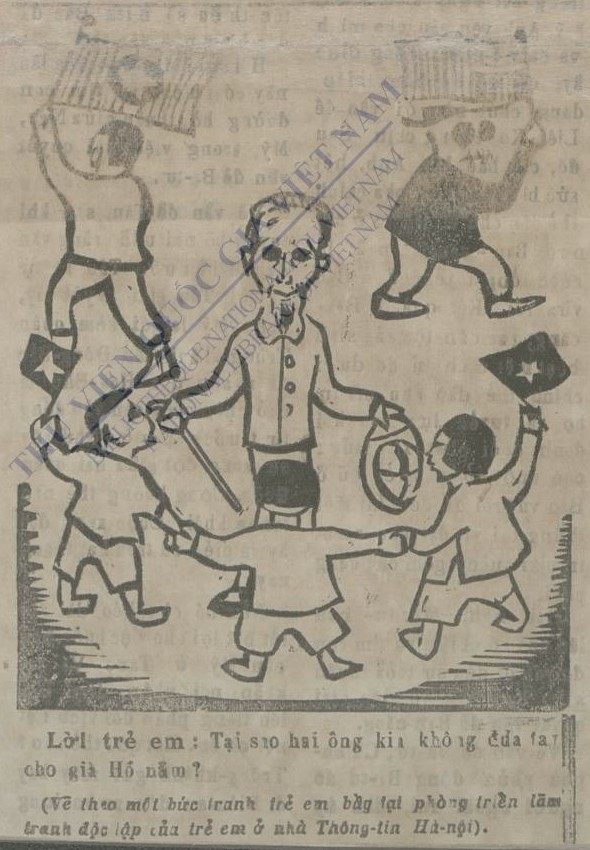
- Top Left: A Viet Minh soldier and an anti-communist nationalist soldier, wearing a salacot and calot respectively, accuse each other of being Việt gian (traitors). Drawing from a nationalist newspaper in Huế, June 1947. Top Right: A political meeting in Hanoi, circa March or April 1946, featuring the flags of the Việt Minh, Việt Quốc (Đại Việt, VNQDĐ), Việt Cách, and Dân Chủ. Bottom left: Bảo Đại (center) at a meeting of nationalist leaders in British Hong Kong in 1947. Bottom right: Ho Chi Minh and children holding the Viet Minh flag while the two men behind holding the flags of Viet Quoc and Viet Cach. A drawing from Sự thật newspaper.
Date	August 1945 – June 1949
Location	French Indochina
Result	Partial Viet Minh victory: Élysée Accords; Destruction of the Trotskyists; Virtual dissolution of nationalist parties; Death of multiple opposition politicians; Emergence of attentistes and the State of Vietnam; Arrival of the Cold War in Indochina

Belligerents
Communists: Democratic Republic of Vietnam; (North Vietnam) Việt Minh; Indochinese Communist Party; Democratic Party of Vietnam; Socialist Party of Vietnam; Vanguard Youth; Pro-Viet Minh VRL; Pro-Viet-Minh Bình Xuyên (1945–1946); Buddhist Association for National Salvation; Catholic Association for National Salvation; Pro-Viet Minh Caodaists; Dân xã Hòa Hảo Resistance League; Pro-Viet Minh protestants; Co-belligerent: France (1946)	Nationalists: Nationalist Parties Front (1945–1946); Đại Việt QDĐ; Việt Nam QDĐ; Union National Front (1947-1949); National Protective Youth Union (from 1947); Vietnam Revolutionary League; Đại Việt Duy Dân Đảng (1945-1946); Vietnam National Restoration League; Vietnamese National Independence Party; Vietnam Evangelical Church; Warlords: Vietnam Catholic Federation (from 1947); Hòa Hảo; Vietnamese Democratic Socialist Party; Tây Ninh Holy See; Caodaist Army; Bình Xuyên; Pure Land Buddhist Laity Association; Trotskyist: Struggle Group; October Group; Hòn Gai-Cẩm Phả Commune; Autonomous Cochinchina (1946–1948); Provisional Central Government of Vietnam (1948–1949) Allied mission: (1945–1946); Republic of China French Union (1948–1949)	Monarchists: Empire of Vietnam (1945); National Unified Front; Đại Việt Phục hưng Hội; Đại Việt National Socialist Party; Empire of Japan; Constitutionalist: Indochinese Constitutionalist Party

Commanders and leaders
Ho Chi Minh; Trường Chinh; Nguyễn Lương Bằng; Huỳnh Thúc Kháng # Phạm Văn Đồng; Hoàng Quốc Việt; Trần Văn Giàu; Lê Giản; Võ Nguyên Giáp; Chu Văn Tấn; Nguyễn Bình; Dương Bạch Mai; Dương Đức Hiền; Phan Tư Nghĩa; Phạm Ngọc Thạch; Bồ Xuân Luật; Dương Văn Dương †; Huỳnh Văn Trí; Thích Trí Độ; Thích Thanh Tứ; Cao Triều Phát; Phạm Bá Trực; Huỳnh Thiện Từ; Trần Văn Đệ Philippe Leclerc; Jean Sainteny; Jean Crépin Trần Văn Soái (until 1948)	Trương Tử Anh (executed); Vũ Hồng Khanh; Nguyễn Tường Tam; Nghiêm Kế Tổ; Nhượng Tống †; Nguyễn Tường Long # Nguyễn Tôn Hoàn; Trần Văn Tuyên; Phan Kích Nam (executed); Khái Hưng (executed); Đỗ Văn Năng; Hà Thúc Ký; Nguyễn Hải Thần; Trương Đình Tri †; Lý Đông A †; Cường Để; Hồ Văn Ngà (executed); Lê Văn Thái Thaddeus Lê Hữu Từ; Trần Văn Lý; Huỳnh Phú Sổ (executed); Lê Quang Vinh; Trần Văn Soái (from 1948); Nguyễn Bảo Toàn; Phạm Công Tắc; Trần Quang Vinh; Lê Văn Viễn; Lâm Văn Hậu; Lê Văn Thái Tạ Thu Thâu (executed); Phan Văn Hùm (executed); Phan Văn Chánh (executed); Ngô Văn Nguyễn Văn Thinh †; Lê Văn Hoạch; Bảo Đại; Nguyễn Văn Xuân; Trần Văn Hữu; Đinh Xuân Quảng; Nghiêm Xuân Thiện Lu Han Georges Thierry d'Argenlieu; Jean Étienne Valluy; Émile Bollaert	Trần Trọng Kim; Ngô Đình Khôi (executed); Phạm Quỳnh (executed); Nguyễn Bá Trác (executed); Nguyễn Xuân Tiếu; Yuitsu Tsuchihashi (POW); Hisaichi Terauchi Bùi Quang Chiêu †

Units involved
People's Army of Vietnam; Viet Minh National Guards; Vanguard Youth; Religious militias; Bình Xuyên resistance forces; Total: 100,000: Tonkinese French Far East Expeditionary Corps (1946)	Vietnamese National Revolutionary Army: ~10,000 troops Duy Dân militias: 2,000; Diocese of Phát Diệm defense forces: 4,000; Hòa Hảo armed forces: Unknown; Caodaist armed forces: 6,000 (1949); Bình Xuyên: 10,000 French Far East Expeditionary Corps/French Foreign Legion: Total 110,000; National Revolutionary Army: 200,000 (1945-1945); Viet Guard (Việt binh đoàn): ~10,000 (1948-1949)	Military of the Nguyễn dynasty (Imperial Guard/Police): Unknown; Southern Expeditionary Army Group: ~11,000; National Revolutionary Divions: Unknown

Civil conflicts in Vietnam were a series of events characterized by political violence and civil war which took place soon after the end of World War II. It lasted from the August Revolution in 1945 until the establishment of the State of Vietnam in 1949, during which the communist-led Viet Minh suppressed and terrorized both nationalist and Trotskyist groups. According to David G. Marr, it was an era of hatred, betrayal, and murder.

== Background ==
Vietnam had been under French control as part of French Indochina since the 1880s. Although under oppression, Vietnam's struggle for independence was shaped by nationalist movements in two main strands: reformist and revolutionary, both embraced republicanism and anticommunist nationalism. Nationalist groups included the Vietnamese Nationalist Party, Vietnamese Revolutionary League, Đại Việt Nationalist Party, and religious communities such as Buddhist, Hòa Hảo, Cao Đài, and Catholic. Vietnamese communism comprised both the Indochinese Communist Party (ICP), established by Nguyen Sinh Cung in 1930, and Trotskyist groups.

Fractures between nationalists and communists emerged in the late 1920s as the two groups differed in their visions for postcolonial Vietnam. Revolutionary nationalists accused communists of being factional and subservient to foreign influence, while communists contended that nationalism was narrow in scope and republicanism was not radical enough. Vietnamese communists envisioned their revolution as both a proletarian revolution and an integral part of world revolution, rather than solely a national movement. They believed class struggle and purges were essential to dismantle older social structures and pave the way for socialism. The Vietnamese communist revolution's pursuit of centralized control fueled a protracted civil conflict, characterized by violence, ideological purges, and the suppression of competing nationalist movements. The ICP was primarily responsible for starting widespread Vietnamese-on-Vietnamese violence.

Before 1945, the Indochinese Communist Party and nationalist parties at one point cooperated, especially under Chinese pressure during the resistance against Japan. They might share a common educational background and were sometimes related by blood or marriage. From 1924 to 1927, in southern China, diverse anti-French colonial Vietnamese groups interacted with each other, as well as with Chinese, Korean, and other groups. From 1941 to 1944 in southern China, the Việt Nam Quốc Dân Đảng (Viet Quoc) and the Vietnam Revolutionary League (Viet Cach) joined Viet Minh against the Japanese, sometimes denouncing each other to the Chinese, but did not kidnap or assassinate each other. It was the competition for membership, aid and patronage from the Chinese, rather than ideological differences, that led to increased tensions between the exiled organizations.

The ICP also cooperated with the Trotskyists in Cochinchina from 1933 to 1937. But in 1945, the Viet Minh had carried out assassinations of Trotskyist leaders.

After the end of World War II, the Empire of Japan surrendered and the Allied Powers made the decision to temporarily split Indochina in half at the 16th parallel. This arrangement allowed the Chinese Kuomintang to receive the Japanese surrender in the North, while British forces did so in the South. The British, however, also enabled the French to reestablish control over southern Vietnam.

== Northern Front ==
The Viet Minh sought to consolidate power by terrorizing and purging rival Vietnamese nationalist groups and Trotskyist activists. In 1946, the Franco-Chinese and Ho–Sainteny Agreements enabled French forces to replace the Chinese north of the 16th parallel and facilitated a coexistence between the DRV and French that strengthened the Viet Minh while undermining the nationalists. That summer, the Viet Minh colluded with French forces to eliminate nationalists, targeted for their ardent anti-colonialism. Civil war broke out in Vietnam for the first time since the eighteenth century.

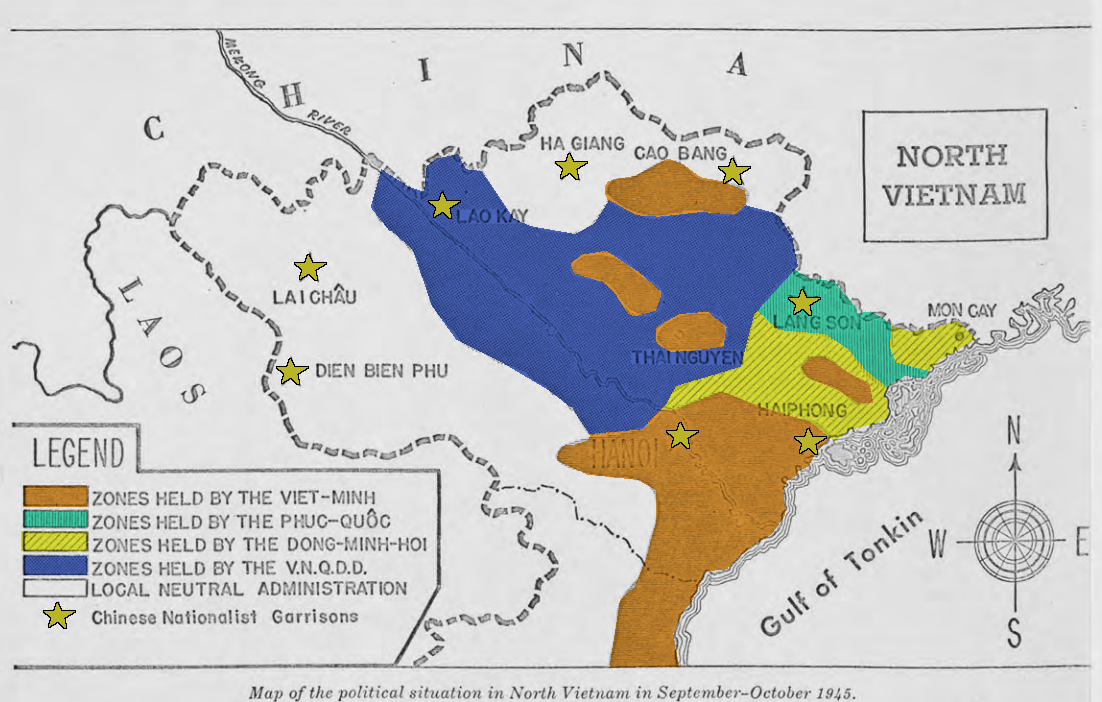
Map of the political situation in Northern Vietnam, highlighting different parties in September–October 1945

=== Đại Việt National Socialist Party and the Empire of Vietnam ===
The Đại Việt National Socialist Party (abbreviated as Đại Việt Quốc Xã or ĐVQX) followed national socialism and was founded by Nguyễn Xuân Tiếu in 1936. Formed in early 1944 in Vietnam, the Đại Việt National Alliance brought together the four Đại Việt parties (Đại Việt Quốc dân, Đại Việt Quốc Xã, Đại Việt Dân Chính, and Đại Việt Duy Dân) along with the Tân Việt Nam Quốc dân Đảng. By June 1945, the alliance had become the most important nationalist revolutionary force in northern Vietnam.

Đại Việt Quốc Xã was the only Dai Viet force that committed politically to the Japanese, providing support for the establishment of the Empire of Vietnam, sponsored by Japan during the end of the Pacific War. Đại Việt Quốc Xã was a monarchist force with about 2,000 members, influential in the Northern areas such as Hanoi and Hai Phong during World War II.

After the Viet Minh seized power, the government of Trần Trọng Kim has fallen, on September 5, 1945, Minister of Interior Affairs Võ Nguyên Giáp ordered the dissolution of Dai Viet National Socialist Party on the grounds that "the Dai Viet National Socialist Party had aiding the invaders to plot things harmful to Vietnam's independence activities".

=== Phục Hưng Hội and the death of Ngô Đình Khôi ===
The Đại Việt Phục hưng Hội was founded in early 1942, led by three brothers Ngô Đình Khôi, Ngo Dinh Diem and Ngo Dinh Nhu. The association supported Prince Cường Để, advocating alliance with the Japanese Empire to eliminate French influence in Indochina. The association developed mainly among the mandarin families in Huế, not widely among the masses.

Although the activities of the Phục Hưng Hội were very secret, they were still discovered by the French Sûreté. In early 1944, the Sûreté in Annam organized a round-up that dismantled the association, while the Japanese made no move to intervene. Ngo Dinh Diem reemerged as a revolutionary nationalist activist.

On March 9, 1945, the Japanese overthrow the French administration in Indochina, the Phuc Hung Hoi resumed its activities. The association also actively promoted the establishment of the Empire of Vietnam under the leadership of Prince Cường Để, as emperor and Ngo Dinh Diem, as chief of cabinet (prime minister). However, the Japanese chose to continue to maintain Emperor Bao Dai, and under pressure from the Japanese, Bao Dai appointed Trần Trọng Kim as Chief of Cabinet of the Empire of Vietnam. This event divided the support of the Phuc Hung Hoi for Kim regime.

After Japanese surrendered, the Dai Viet Phuc Hung Hoi lost its support once again. Especially after Ngô Đình Khôi, along with Ngô Đình Huân and Phạm Quỳnh, were arrested and executed by the Viet Minh, causing great damage to the association's morale. The Phuc Hung Hoi was forced to dissolve, and a few key members moved to another political movements with greater influence.

=== Duy dân Party ===
On September 1, 1945, Đại Việt Duy dân Đảng members was attacked by the Viet Minh in Nga My (now part of Gia Sơn, Ninh Bình). Duy dân leader Lý Đông A later moved to Hòa Bình province. Many members from other places who were persecuted also fled to Hoa Binh. In 1946, Việt Minh forces attacked Duy dân's base in Hòa Bình; Lý Đông A reportedly disappeared or killed in the aftermath. The Duy dân party was virtually dissolved. Its surviving partisans fled to Thanh Hóa and the Phát Diệm–Bùi Chu area.

=== Nationalist Parties Front ===
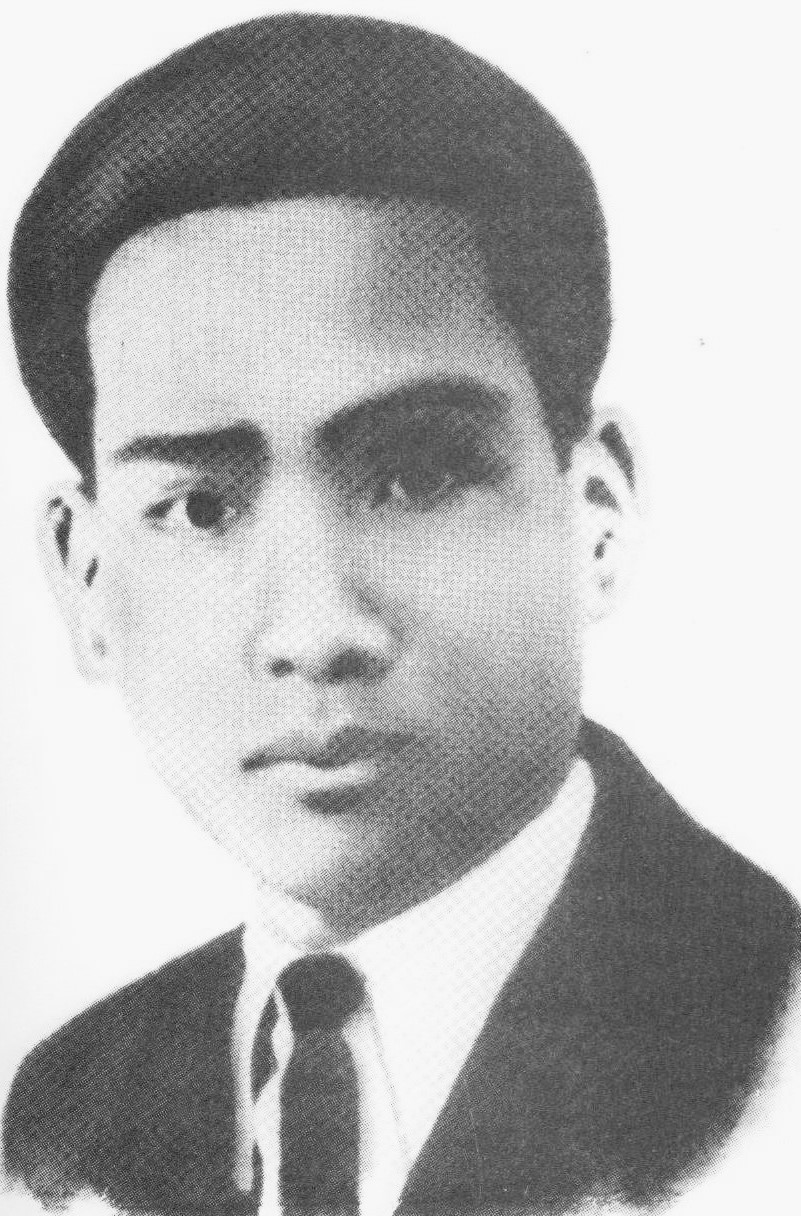
Trương Tử Anh, leader of NPF

The Nationalist Parties Front was formed in southern China in May 1945. It brought together the Đại Việt Quốc dân Đảng, the Đại Việt Dân Chính Đảng, and the Overseas Section of the Việt Nam Quốc dân Đảng.

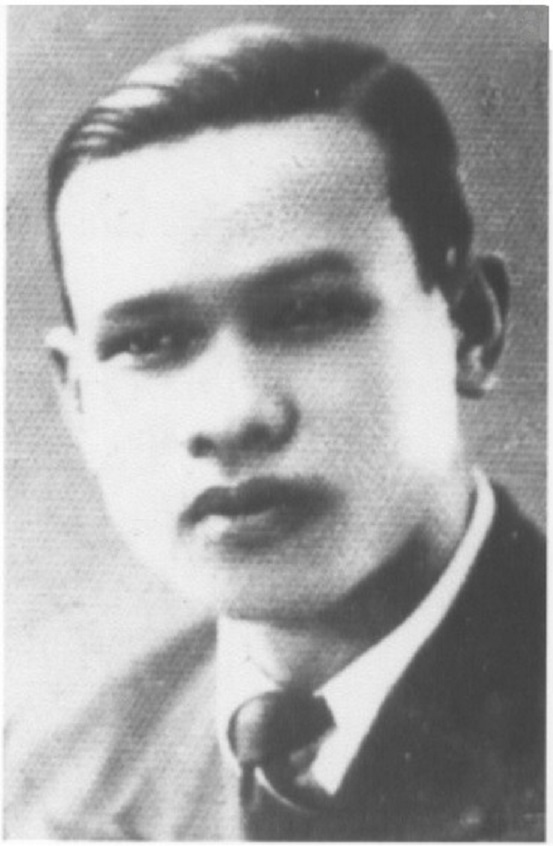
Lê Khang, one of the most prominent leaders of VNQDĐ

After the Viet Minh seized Hanoi on August 19, 1945, Lê Khang led a group of Việt Nam Quốc Dân Đảng from Hanoi to Vĩnh Yên on the Lào Cai – Hanoi railway. On August 29, 1945, thousands of Viet Minh supporters from three neighboring districts approached the VNQDĐ base in Vinh Yen and called on them to join the parade through the town. But the VNQDĐ refused, the Viet Minh shot VNQDĐ members. VNQDĐ returned, killed and captured about 150 people.

On September 18, 1945, Hoàng Văn Đức, leader of the Democratic Party of Vietnam, and representatives of the Democratic Republic of Vietnam government from Hanoi came to Vinh Yen to negotiate. The negotiations failed, Lê Khang attacked Phúc Yên but unsuccessful. Government forces launched a counter-offensive in Vinh Yen but failed to capture the town. After that, both sides ceased fire for several months. The Nationalists did not compete with the Viet Minh for influence in the countryside, except for occupying Tam Long farm in Vinh Yen. In early December 1945, the Viet Minh attacked Tam Long but were repelled.

Gen. Võ Nguyên Giáp described the leaders of VNQDĐ and Đồng Minh Hội as people who considered themselves patriots but were in fact just "a group of reactionaries trying to find attention" with the support of Kuomintang. In addition, the Chinese forces also pressured members of the VNQDĐ to hold important positions in the government. Giáp believed that there was no different than replacing French colonialism with Chinese domination. Ho Chi Minh advised Giáp to be patient, because VNQDĐ had the strong support of 200,000 Chinese troops stationed throughout the North.

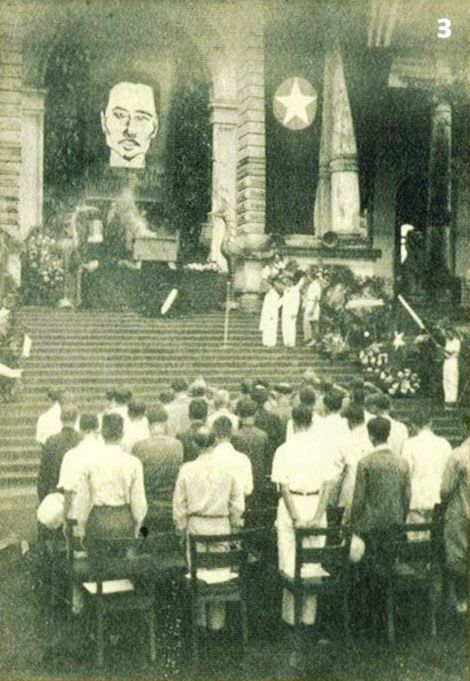
Ceremony in honor of Nguyễn Thái Học, first leader of Việt Nam Quốc Dân Đảng and Yên Bái mutiny by its members in Hanoi in June 1946

In June 1946, when the Chinese forces withdrew to Yunnan, the Viet Minh militia isolated the towns controlled by VNQDĐ. On June 18, 1946, the Viet Minh attacked Phú Thọ and Việt Trì. The Vietnamese National Revolutionary Army in Phu Tho withdrew after 4 days.

In June 1946, in Hanoi, members of the VNQDĐ met to discuss whether to acknowledge the leadership of the Viet Minh, retreat to the border, or organize a coup to overthrow the government of the Democratic Republic of Vietnam. Meanwhile, Trương Tử Anh, the leader of the Vietnam Nationalist Front was planning a coup that could begin with attacks on French soldiers to cause chaos. The French also intended to parade around Hoàn Kiếm Lake to celebrate Bastille Day (July 14, 1789), causing the security forces of the Democratic Republic of Vietnam to worry that this event could become a target of parties opposing the Viet Minh.

On the night of July 11, the Northern Public Security force received information that the VNQDĐ force had finished printing leaflets and appeals, some of which had been sent to the provinces. Early in the morning of July 12, the VNQDĐ headquarters in Hanoi would withdraw into secrecy to carry out the final stage of a coup to overthrow the Government of the Democratic Republic of Vietnam.

Ho Chi Minh assigned Võ Nguyên Giáp and Trần Quốc Hoàn, who later became Minister of Public Security, the task of neutralizing demonstrations organized by the VNQDĐ and the Đồng Minh Hội to end the propaganda activities of these parties among the people. Giáp said: "We had to punish the saboteurs... But at all costs we had to avoid provocation and ensure that no major conflicts occurred". After the "Ôn Như Hầu case", the coup attempt failed. Trương Tử Anh arrested and executed, Nhất Linh, Vũ Hồng Khanh, and Nguyễn Hải Thần fled to China.

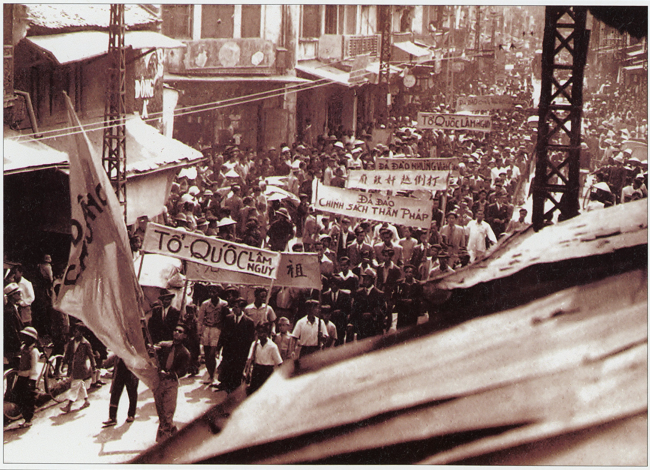
A demonstration on Hàng Đường Street with slogans opposing the Viet Minh's government policy of accommodation toward France, Hanoi, February 20, 1946

=== Đồng Minh Hội ===
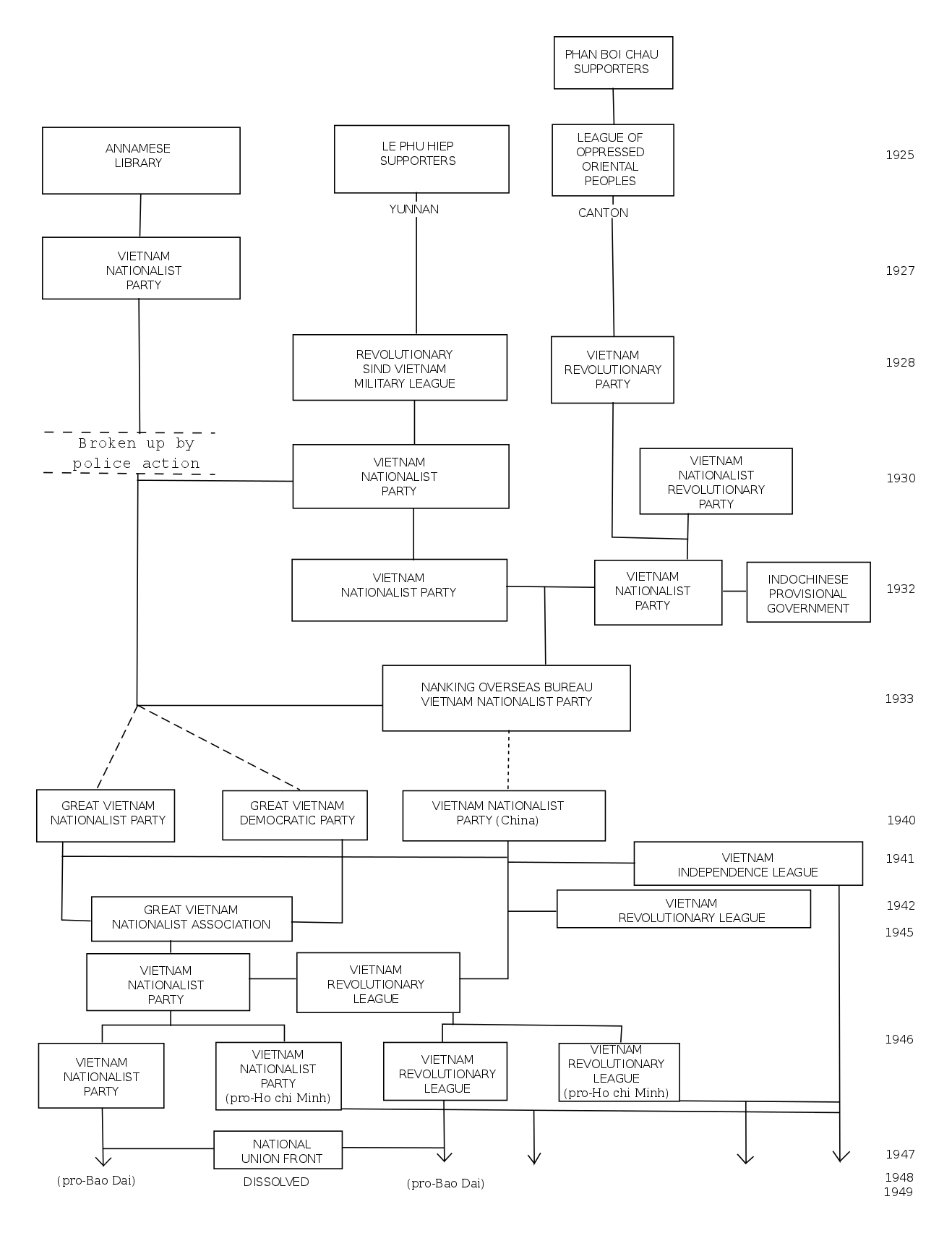
VNQDĐ and Đồng Minh Hội structure

When the Chinese troops entered Northern Vietnam to disarm the Japanese army, the forces of the Vietnam Revolutionary League (Đồng Minh Hội) followed, the purpose of the VNQDĐ and Đồng Minh Hội was to open the way, create a base for the Chinese nationalist forces to enter Vietnam, cause armed conflicts with the Viet Minh and seize local power. On May 11, four brigades of Đồng Minh Hội acted in four directions across the border. However, these forces, when in armed conflict with the Viet Minh, 3 armies commanded by Le Tung Son, Bồ Xuân Luật and Trương Trung Phụng laid down their weapons, disarmed themselves and joined the Viet Minh national army, only one force led by Vũ Kim Thành fled to the Hải Ninh province and was destroyed. Bo Xuan Luat was appointed as Minister in the coalition government by the Viet Minh.

The Đồng Minh Hội leaders had no difficulty controlling Móng Cái and others areas from the Viet Minh until the Chinese forces withdrew in April 1946. Government officials in those places were faced with the choice of remaining loyal to the Đồng Minh Hội, remaining neutral, or evacuating the town. The Đồng Minh Hội sometimes had to seek permission from the government of the Viet Minh to carry out some of their activities.

Nguyễn Hải Thần, Đồng Minh Hội leader briefly joined Viet Minh's coalition government that comprised several non-Communist party leaders. After Ho Chi Minh signed a modus vivendi Marius Moutet (Minister of Overseas France and her Colonies), France was able to return to its former colony. The move bought Hồ precious time to deal with the non-communist military forces. As soon as the Chinese troops that had entered Vietnam to disarm the Japanese were replaced by French expeditionary forces, Hồ's Việt Minh attacked all non-communist bases in the country. Thần, who opposed Hồ's communist connections, fled to Nanjing, before departing for Hong Kong where he remained until his death in 1959. He supported the establishment of new Vietnamese state with Bảo Đại being its leader, this state would be the State of Vietnam.

== Southern Front ==
=== Dissolution of the National Unified Front ===
The Mặt trận Quốc gia Thống nhất (National Unified Front) was a Vietnamese political alliance formed on 14 August 1945 in Southern Vietnam uniting all non-Viet Minh factions, including the southern religious sects of Cao Đài and Hòa Hảo. The Trotskyists did not officially join but maintained contact with the Front.

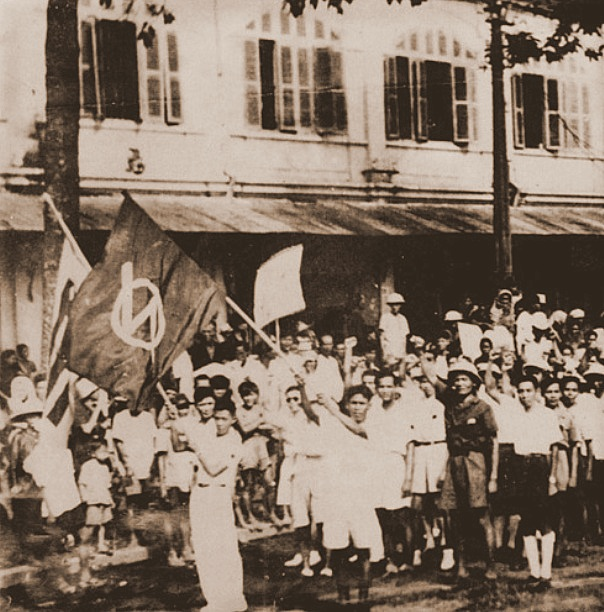
The demonstration in Saigon, 21 August 1945 of the NUF with the flags of Trotskyist and the Empire of Vietnam

During the August Revolution, on August 21, 1945, the NUF organized a large demonstration to show its strength in Saigon with over 200,000 participants.

In August, the front and the Viet Quoc held a military conference to establish:

- The First Revolutionary Militia Division (Dân quân Cách mạng Đệ nhất Sư đoàn) led by veterans of the Japanese imperial forces and Bình Xuyên.
- The Second Revolutionary Militia Division (Dân quân Cách mạng Đệ nhị Sư đoàn) led by Nguyễn Thành Phương and Trình Minh Thế from Caodaism.
- The Third Revolutionary Militia Division (Dân quân Cách mạng Đệ tam Sư đoàn) led by Nguyễn Hoà Hiệp (Viet Quoc).
- The Fourth Revolutionary Militia Division (Dân quân Cách mạng Đệ tứ Sư đoàn) led by Hòa Hảo.

On August 22, the Vanguard Youth left the NUF and joined the Viet Minh Front, the August Revolution succeeded. In the following meeting of the Front, Trần Văn Giàu persuaded the parties within the Front to transfer power to the Viet Minh because the Front could be seen by the Allies as a pro-Japanese organization while the Viet Minh was cooperating with the Allies (US military intelligence OSS) against Japan.

The NUF dissolved itself and, as requested, its members briefly cooperated with the Viet Minh due to the looming threat of a French reconquest.

=== Fall of Trotskyism in Vietnam ===
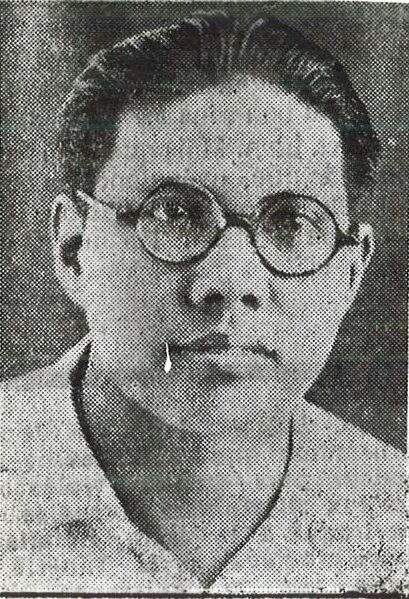
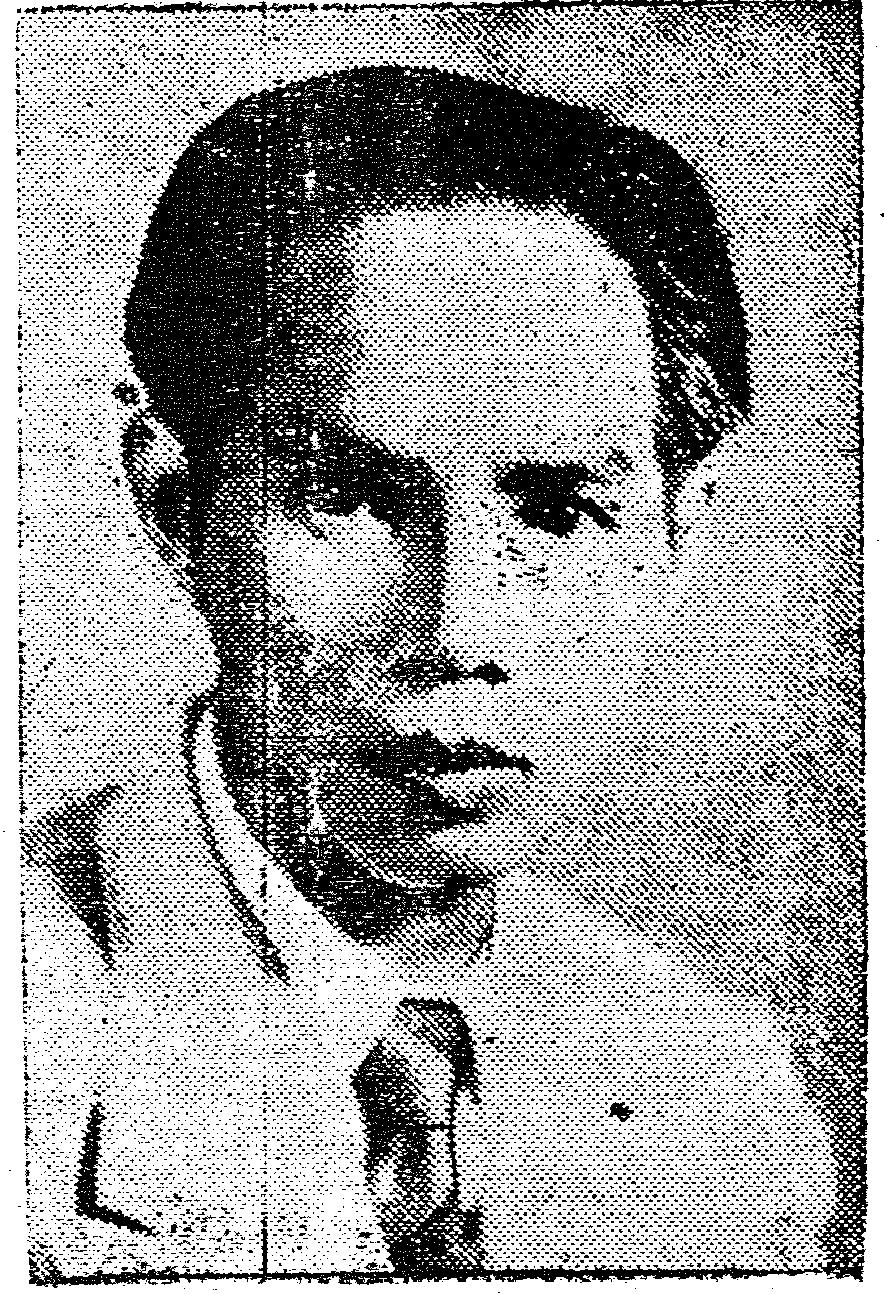
Tạ Thu Thâu and Phan Văn Hùm, main leaders of the Trotskyist movement in Vietnam

Vietnamese Trotskyists were hunted down by both the Stalinist-front Viet Minh and French Sûreté. Immediately after banning the Đại Việt Nationalist Party, the Viet Minh denounced the Trotskyists (the La Lutte group and the ICL) as its enemies. The Indochinese Communist Party and the Trotskyists had long criticized each other as imperialist lackeys. However, the conflict between the two groups before 1945 was only expressed through newspapers, speeches, and leaflets. After 1945, the two groups disagreed on the implementation of the social revolution and how to deal with the Allied forces landing in Cochinchina. The Trotskyists wanted to immediately carry out a social revolution and armed the masses against the Allied forces, while the ICP wanted to carry out national liberation first, then make a social revolution while compromising with the Allies to gain independence step by step.

On September 7 and 8, 1945, Trotskyists and Hòa Hảo alliance launched a bloody attack on Viet Minh members in Cần Thơ. They organized a demonstration of about 20,000 Hoà Hảo Buddhists with the slogans "Armed masses against French colonialism. Cleansing the rotten elements in the Southern Administrative Committee". The Viet Minh mobilized the Vanguard Youth led by Phạm Ngọc Thạch to fire on the demonstrators, killing and injuring many people.

In August 1945, the Trotskyists launched a social revolutionary program. Together with the Caodai, Hòa Hảo, and Bình Xuyên sects, they encouraged peasants to seize landlords' property and divide their land among themselves. Many landlords were killed by peasants. The Viet Minh opposed the incitement of peasants to seize landlords' land and declared: "We have not yet carried out a communist revolution to solve the land problem. The current government is only a democratic government, so it does not have the above-mentioned mission. All those who incite peasants to seize landlords' property will be severely punished." The Viet Minh believed that actions like the one the Trotskyists were doing would cause social rifts and hinder Vietnam's independence from France.

Then, Dương Bạch Mai imprisoned the Trotskyists in Saigon. British troops found them on the night of September 22, 1945, and handed them over to the French. After their release, the Trotskyists organized attacks on British and French troops in response to the call for resistance in the South by the Southern Resistance Committee headed by Tran Van Giau. During a general withdrawal of the Southern resistance forces in mid-October 1945, the Indochinese Communist Party systematically hunted down, arrested, and executed about 20 Trotskyist leaders, including Phan Văn Hùm, a prestigious leader of the Trotskyist faction. Other Trotskyist members had to take refuge with Hoà Hảo and other nationalist parties in the Mekong Delta.

In late 1945, on the way to Hanoi, Tạ Thu Thâu, the main leader of the Trotskyist movement was arrested and executed by the Viet Minh in Quảng Ngãi. Some other sources say that after the Japanese coup against the French in March, Thâu returned to Cochinchina. On his way back, he was captured by the Viet Minh and later executed in Quang Ngai.

In the North, local authorities were ordered to detect, arrest and imprison Trotskyists, although the government did not issue any document prohibiting this force. By 1946, Trotskyists in the North were no longer a concern to the government or any Trotskyists were discovered. In the press, the word Trotskyist continued to appear as a warning to state employees who openly complained about insufficient wages or who dared to fight for workers' control of factories and enterprises. The ICP's decision to eradicate an entire Marxist anti-colonial faction in the south shocked politically conscious Vietnamese across the country and has remained a subject of condemnation to this day.

=== Hòa Hảo ===
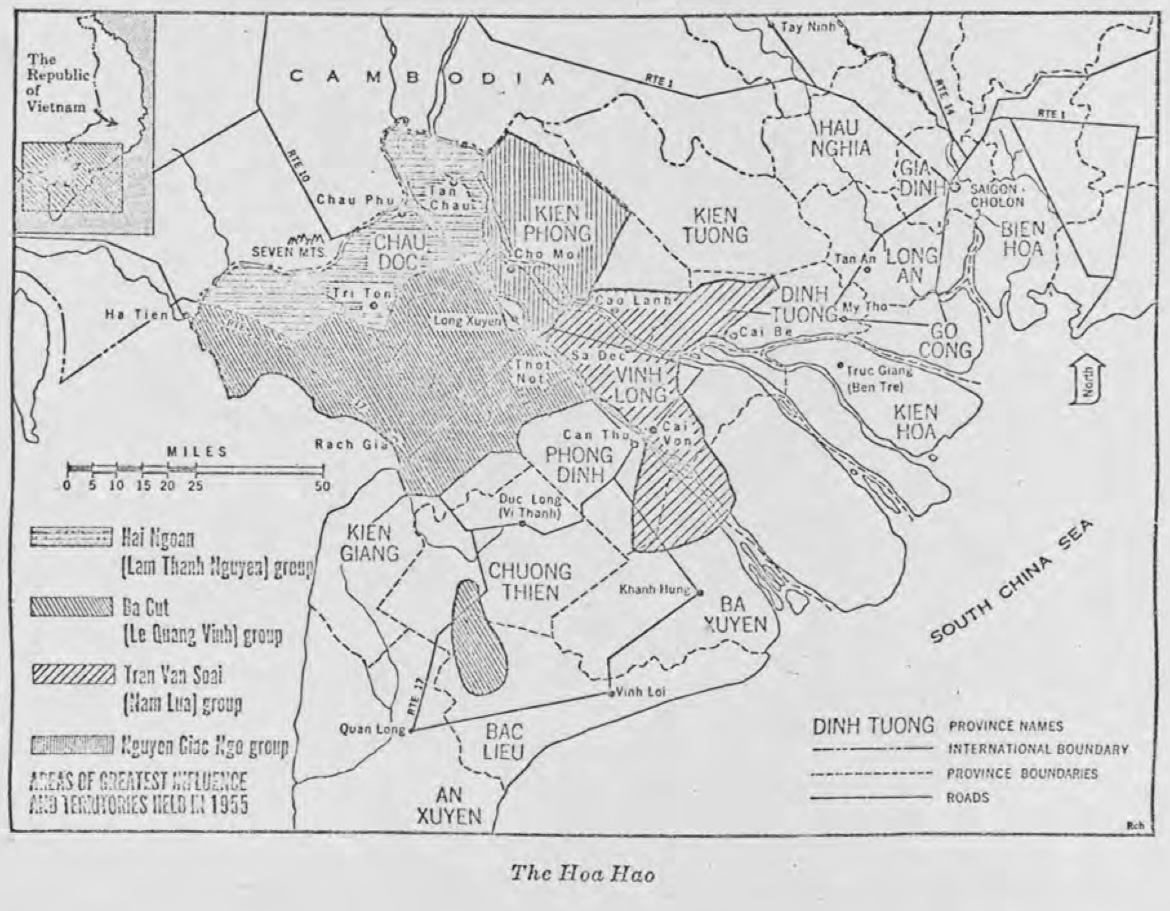
Areas that were controlled by the Hoà Hảo warlords in South Vietnam from 1947 to 1954.

On February 6, 1946, in Chợ Mới (Long Xuyên), Nguyễn Hữu Xuyến, Regiment Commander of Viet Minh Eighth Zone, signed an agreement with Trần Văn Soái, a warlord of Dân xã Hoà Hảo, to put aside all old grudges and misunderstandings and unite to fight against the French Union.

The Hòa Hảo's alliance with the Việt Minh was short-lived and the NUF dissolved in July 1946, while Huỳnh Phú Sổ became estranged from his military leaders. It was immediately evident that the Hòa Hảo's demands for religious autonomy and political sovereignty were irreconcilable with Việt Minh ambitions. Soon after, Sổ was preaching with growing zeal against the Việt Minh, whom he saw as posing an even greater threat to the religious movement than the French. The conflict with the Việt Minh devolved into a holy war. Sổ preached that every Hòa Hảo who killed ten Việt Minh would have a direct path to heaven.

In March 1947, Trần Văn Soái broke the alliance with the Viet Minh and together with a battalion of the French Foreign Legion launched a major offensive into five villages in the Tan Chau area (Châu Đốc). The Viet Minh 65th National Guard and local militia and guerrillas fought back fiercely, forcing Soái's forces and the French to retreat.

In late March and early April 1947, in Tinh Bien and Tri Ton (Châu Đốc), the Hoà Hảo and Caodaist forces against the Viet Minh continuously attacked areas controlled by the Viet Minh, massacred civilians, burned down villages, and hunted down there cadres. Not only killing civilians, the Hoà Hảo warlords militia also organized looting in areas controlled by the Viet Minh in the provinces of Long Xuyên, Châu Đốc, and Cần Thơ. The Viet Minh responded by attacking Hoa Hao bases from March 23 to April 6, 1947, forcing the Hoà Hảo armed forces to retreat.

On 18 April 1947, Sổ was invited to a Việt Minh stronghold in the Plain of Reeds for a conciliation meeting. He refused the Communists' demands and made for home, but he was halted while sailing through Long Xuyên on the Đốc Vàng Hạ River, most of his company was slain, and he was arrested by the southern Việt Minh leader Nguyễn Bình. Sổ was killed, and to prevent the Hoahaoists from recovering his remains and erecting a martyr's shrine, the Việt Minh quartered Sổ's body and scattered his remains across the country; his remains were never found. From 1949 to 1950, Hoà Hảo remained inactive, "neutralized", did not persecuted and clashes with Viet Minh forces.

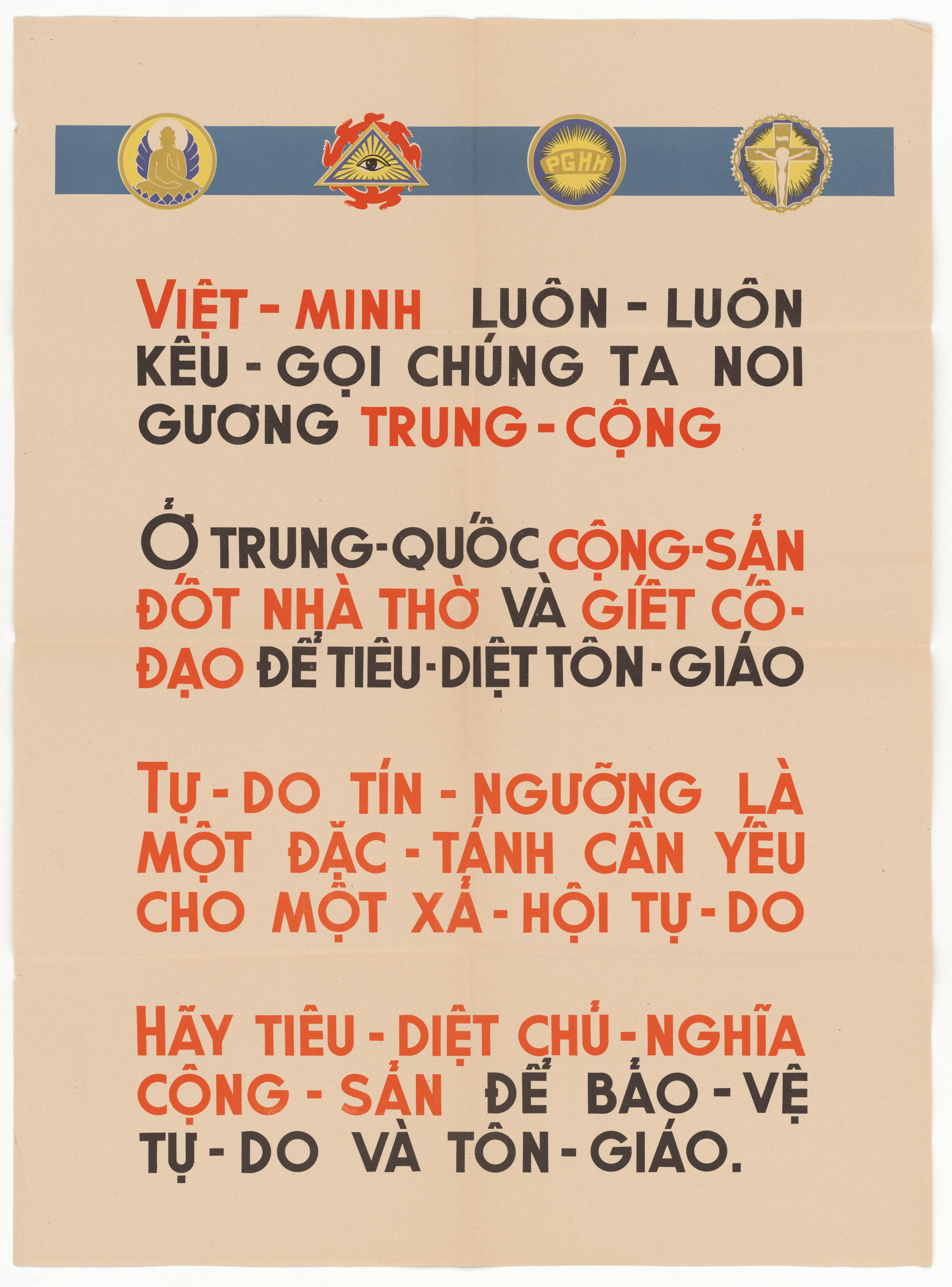
The Viet Minh are against religions, an Hòa Hảo anti-communist propaganda poster

=== Caodaist ===
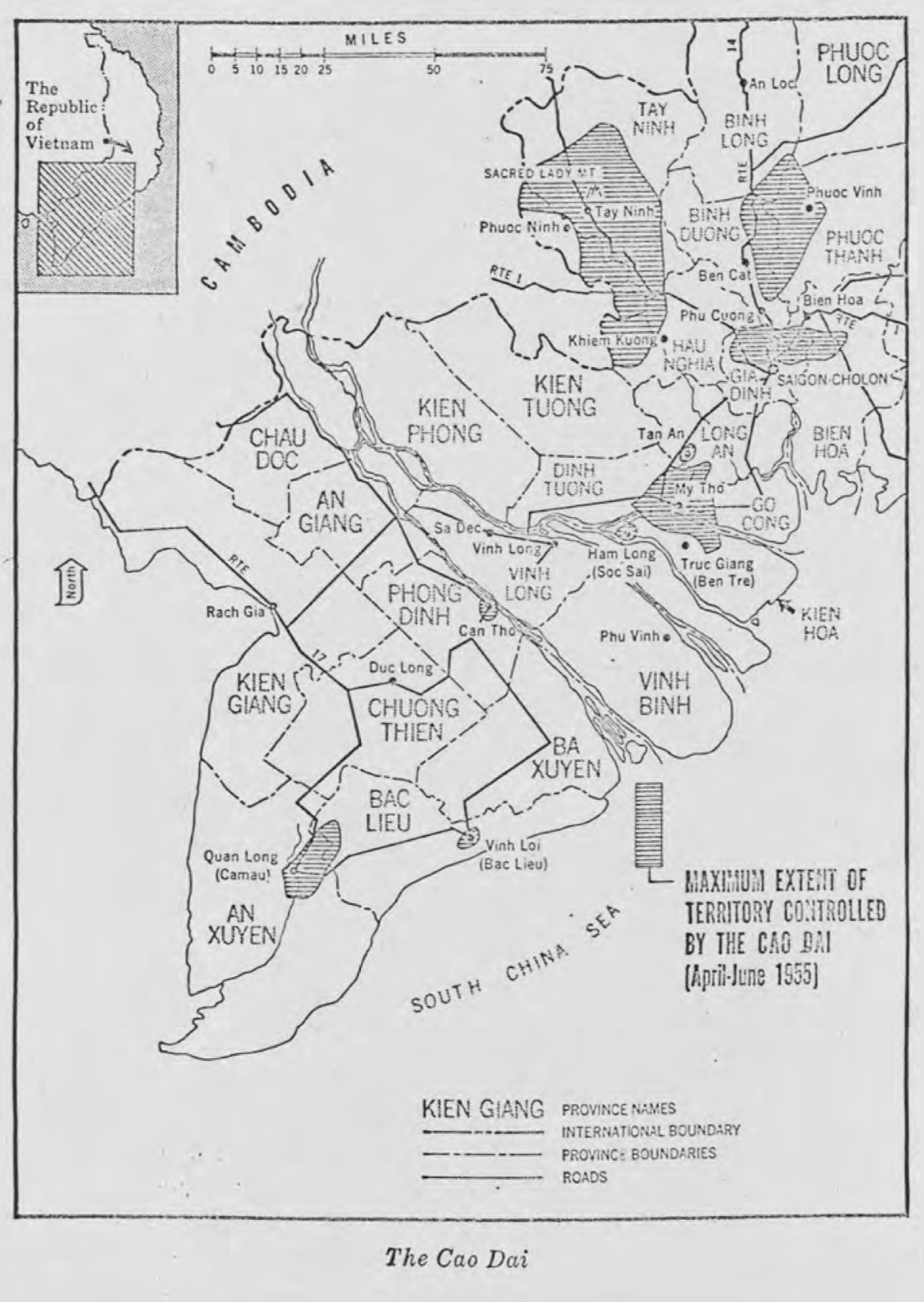
Areas that were controlled by the Cao Đài force in South Vietnam until 1954.

During the August Revolution, many Caodaist paramilitary groups joined the CaoDai National Salvation Front of the Viet Minh and participated in the seizure of power throughout the South. After seizing power at the end of August 1945, many Caodaist dignitaries were invited by the Viet Minh government to participate in politics. In Tây Ninh, a Caodaist of the Tay Ninh Holy See, Trương Văn Xương, was appointed to be Vice Chairman of the Provincial Administrative Committee, and another Cao Dai dignitary of the Tay Ninh Holy See, Professor Thuong Chu Thanh (Dang Trung Chu), was invited to be an advisor.

When the British and French reoccupied the South, the Caodai Holy See armed forces joined on the first and second fronts, fighting in the East and North of Saigon. After entering the South, the new commander of Viet Minh in Cochinchina, Nguyễn Bình organized the An Phu Xa conference, unifying the armed units into the Viet Minh National Guard . The Cao Dai Holy See Tay Ninh armed forces were organized into two units: 7th division commanded by Nguyễn Thành Phương and 8th division commanded by Nguyen Hoai Thanh. However, the fronts quickly collapsed and crushed by the Franco-British troops. Many armed units disintegrated or became warlords, without unified command. Some high-ranking dignitaries and Cao Dai military commanders withdrew their forces to Tay Ninh and built bases to protect the Tay Ninh Holy See led by its Protector of the Caodaism, Phạm Công Tắc. This separatist action was the reason for the extremist Viet Minh elements to condemn the Cao Dai followers of the Tay Ninh Holy See as traitors. Several bloody clashes broke out between Caodaist and Viet Minh. The 7th and 8th divisions of Cao Dai were surrounded and disarmed by Viet Minh. Trần Quang Vinh, the commander-in-chief of Caodaist Armed Forces was arrested in Chợ Đêm and imprisoned in Cà Mau along with Hồ Văn Ngà, President of the Vietnamese National Independence Party.

To gain more allies in the war against the Viet Minh, the French allowed Protector Phạm Công Tắc to return to the Tay Ninh Holy See, in exchange for the Cao Dai followers not attacking the French and being protected by the French colonial forces. The French allowed the territories controlled by the Tay Ninh Holy See to have autonomy. The Cao Dai armed forces of the Tay Ninh Holy See were protected and armed by the French, with Lieutenant General Vinh as Commander-in-Chief and Major General Nguyễn Văn Thành as Chief of Staff, acting as a supplementary force (Forces supplétives), supporting the French in campaigns to attack the Viet Minh.

Disagreeing with the cooperation of some dignitaries with the French, the remaining dignitaries of the Cao Dai Holy See of Tay Ninh joined "Cao Dai National Salvation", a pro-Viet Minh Caodaist association, expanding into "Cao Dai National Salvation of 12 Sects United" with the stance of continuing to support the resistance against the French. The armed forces of the Cao Dai National Salvation were integrated into the 124th Regiment, fought until the end of the First Indochina War under the command of the Viet Minh. In response to this, the leadership of the Holy See of Tay Ninh announced the expulsion of Cao Dai dignitaries and followers of the Holy See of Tay Ninh who participated in the Cao Dai National Salvation.

== Attentistes ==
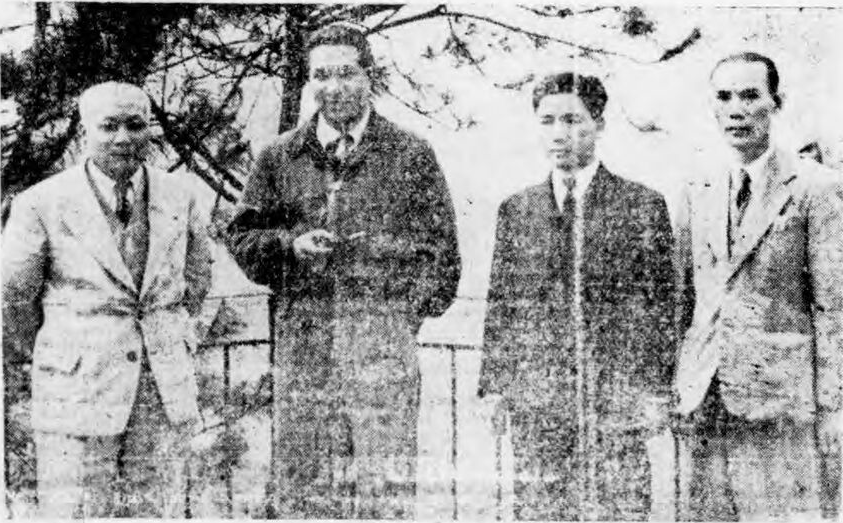
Nguyễn Văn Xuân, Bảo Đại, Ngô Đình Diệm (a prominent attentiste) and Trần Văn Lý in British Hong Kong, December 31, 1947.

After the outbreak of full-scale war between the Viet Minh and France in December 1946, there emerged nationalists who pursued the quest for a ‘Third Force’ that would be both anticommunist and anticolonialist. However, many such attempts failed at that point due to divisions among non-communist groups, prompting many activists to adopt an uneasy neutrality in the conflict, and they were labeled as attentistes. Broadly speaking, the term attentisme referred to an attitude taken by a range of individuals, including traders and merchants, patriotic intellectuals and professionals, as well as leaders such as Ngô Đình Diệm and certain Đại Việt partisans. As the war internationalized in 1950, many of these figures ultimately stepped off the fence and entered the political fray.

Notable attentistes included:

- Ngo Dinh Diem
- Ngô Đình Nhu
- Nguyễn Tôn Hoàn
- Trình Minh Thế
- Trần Văn Tuyên
- Hà Thúc Ký

== Result and aftermath ==
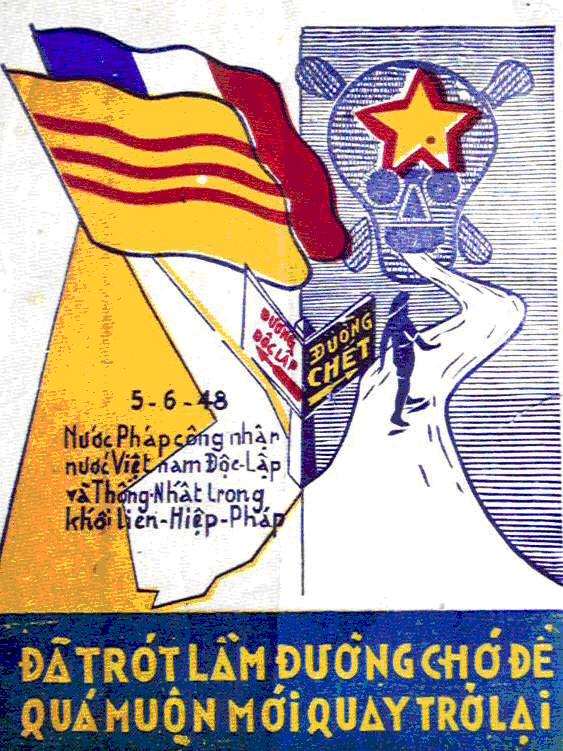
An anti-Viet Minh propaganda poster issued by the French and PCG Vietnamese stating that the Provisional Central Government of Vietnam will lead to independence and the VNDCCH will lead to death. If you've gone down the wrong path, don't let it be too late to turn back

Vietnamese nationalist partisans were largely defeated and compelled to flee. By eliminating the nationalist parties, the Viet Minh had undermined Vietnam's broader ability to resist French reconquest. With negotiations having broken down, tensions between the Viet Minh and French authorities erupted into full-scale war in December 1946. Surviving nationalist partisans and politico-religious groups rallied behind the exiled Bảo Đại to reopen negotiations with France in opposition to communist domination. The State of Vietnam was established on 2 July 1949, following the implementation of the Élysée Accords, which gave it greater independence from France within the French Union. In January 1950, communist China and the Soviet Union recognized the Democratic Republic of Vietnam. Two weeks later, the United States and several other Western countries recognized the State of Vietnam. The civil war and the colonial war in Indochina became internationalized and intertwined with the global Cold War.

== See also ==
- Russian Civil War
- Chinese Civil War
- First Indochina War
- 1955 South Vietnamese conflict
- Vietnam War
