= Chinese occupation of northern Vietnam, 1945–1946 =

Series of conflicts between Nationalist China and Viet Minh

Chinese occupation of northern Vietnam
- Part of the aftermath of World War II and the civil conflicts in Vietnam (1945–1949)
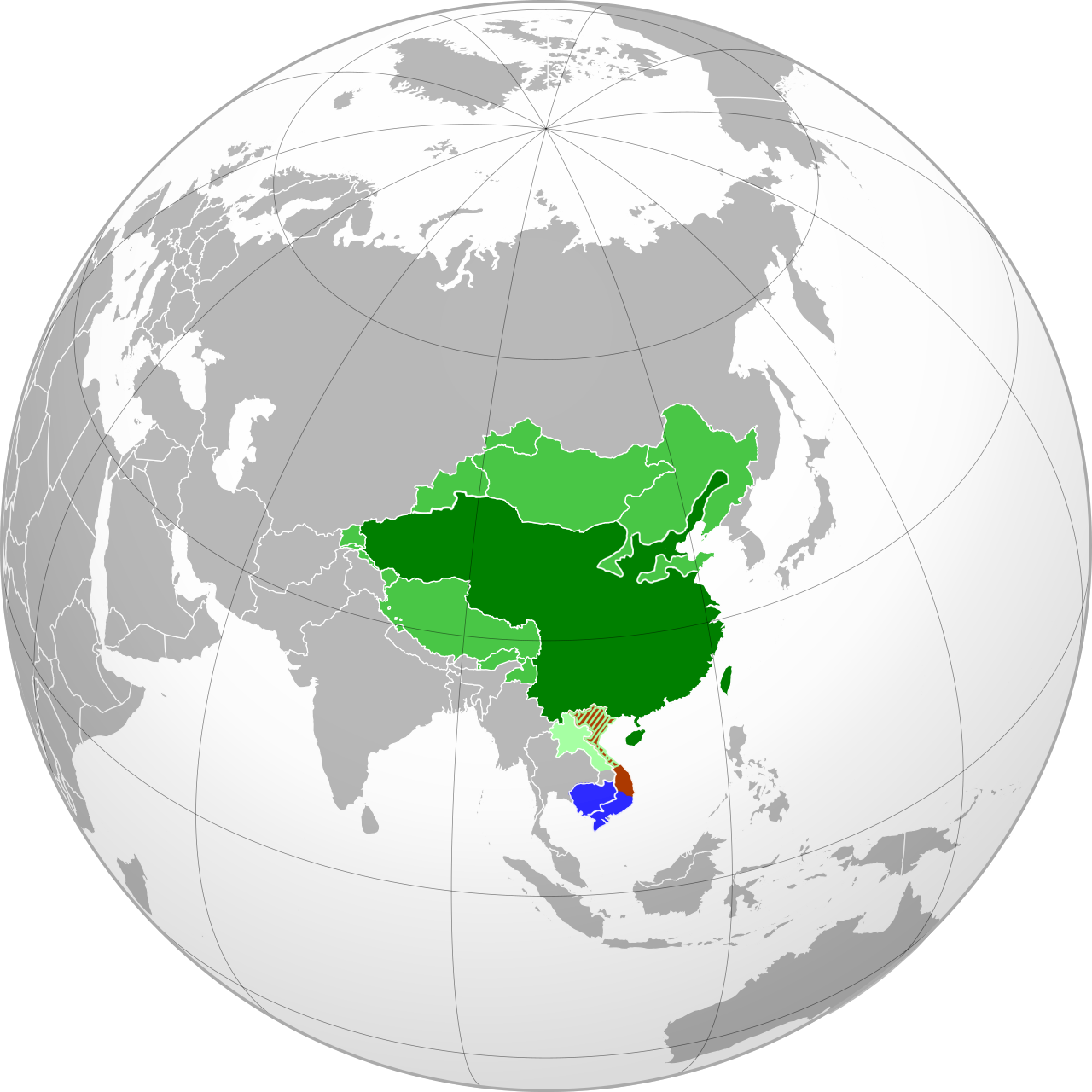
- Republic of China Chinese nationalist territorial claims Chinese Nationalist occupation in North Indochina Democratic Republic of Vietnam Franco-British occupation in South Indochina
Date	21 August 1945 – 15 June 1946
Location	Vietnam north of the 16th parallel
Result	Sino-French and Ho–Sainteny Accords; Dissolution of Indochinese Communist Party and folding into the Institute for Studying Marxism in Indochina; French gradually replaced the Chinese to receive the Japanese surrender in the North; Elimination of Vietnamese nationalist parties
Territorial changes	Việt Nam Quốc Dân Đảng and Đại Việt Nationalist Party captured Yên Bái, Lào Cai, Hà Giang and Vĩnh Yên; VRL captured Móng Cái, Hải Ninh; Viet Minh finished reoccupied those territories in May 1946

Belligerents
Republic of China: Yunnan Revolutionary Army; New Guangxi clique; Việt Nam QDĐ Đại Việt QDĐ Vietnam Revolutionary League; Đại Việt Duy Dân Đảng; Vietnam National Restoration League	Democratic Republic of Vietnam: Việt Minh

Commanders and leaders
Chiang Kai-shek; He Yingqin; Lu Han; Hsiao Wen; Chen Xiuhe; Trương Tử Anh; Vũ Hồng Khanh; Nhất Linh; Nguyễn Hải Thần	Hồ Chí Minh; Huỳnh Thúc Kháng; Chu Văn Tấn; Võ Nguyên Giáp; Trường Chinh; Tôn Đức Thắng; Nguyễn Lương Bằng

Units involved
National Revolutionary Army; Vietnamese National Revolutionary Army	National Defence Force; Viet Minh

Strength
200,000	Unknown

Casualties and losses
Minor	Minor

The Chinese occupation of northern Vietnam (Vietnamese: Hoa quân nhập Việt, Chinese: 華軍入越) followed the Allied decision to have Chinese Nationalist forces oversee the Japanese surrender in Indochina north of the 16th parallel after World War II, including North Vietnam.

The Viet Minh front, which led the newly proclaimed Democratic Republic of Vietnam (DRV), was seeking to gain legitimacy and assert control over the country. The communist-led Viet Minh feared that the Chinese Kuomintang forces would eliminate the communists and their leader Ho Chi Minh (Vietnamese: diệt cộng cầm Hồ).

The Chinese forces (Republic of China), however, also aimed to maintain order in North Vietnam during their occupation, particularly in light of reports of violence erupting in the South during Operation Masterdom. On September 22, Chinese General Lu Han assured Ho that they would not disband the DRV government in Hanoi.

Although Chinese occupation authorities tolerated the DRV government, they nevertheless brought difficulties for the Viet Minh. Lu Han was not opposed to Vietnamese independence but insisted on forming a coalition government consisting of both communists and nationalists. The Kuomintang supported rival Vietnamese nationalist parties, challenging the authority of the DRV.

In 1946, as Chiang Kai-shek wanted to concentrate on the civil war in northern China, he needed to withdraw his troops from Indochina. Ho Chi Minh reasoned that the advantages of compromising with France would outweigh the disadvantages, even expressing hope that a communist-aligned government would soon come to power in France. As a result, Ho favored a French presence over the Chinese one. Negotiations resulted in the Sino-French Accords and the Ho–Sainteny Accords, under which French troops were to replace the Chinese in the task of disarming Japanese forces.

== Background ==
In July 1945 at Potsdam, Germany, the Allied leaders made the decision to divide French Indochina in half—at the 16th parallel—to allow Generalissimo Chiang Kai-shek to receive the Japanese surrender in the North, while Lord Louis Mountbatten would receive the surrender in the South. France was critically weakened as a result of the German occupation, a British-Indian force was installed in order to help the French Provisional Government in re-establishing control over their former colonial possession.

== History ==
On 21 August 1945, General Lu Han was ordered to lead 200,000 Chinese soldiers into northern Vietnam; they entered in early September. 90,000 arrived by October, the 62nd army came on 26 September to Nam Định and Haiphong. Lạng Sơn and Cao Bằng were occupied by the Guangxi 62nd army corps and the Red River Delta region and Lai Cai were occupied by a column from Yunnan. Vietnamese VNQDD fighters accompanied the Chinese soldiers. Ho Chi Minh ordered his DRV administration to set quotas for rice to give to the Chinese soldiers and rice was sold in Chinese currency in the Red River delta. Lu Han occupied the French governor general's palace after ejecting the French staff under Jean Sainteny. Chinese soldiers occupied northern Indochina north of the 16th parallel while the British under the South-East Asia Command of Mountbatten occupied the south. Chiang Kai-shek withheld his skilled soldiers from occupying Vietnam since he was going to use them to fight in the Chinese Civil War and instead sent undisciplined warlord troops from Yunnan under Lu Han to occupy Vietnam north of the 16th parallel to disarm and get Imperial Japanese Army troops to surrender. On many occasions, Ho Chi Minh gave in to Chinese demands. During "Gold Week" in September 1945, a large part of gold taels, jewelry and coins were used to pay the Chinese forces occupying northern Vietnam. Rice to Cochinchina by the French in October 1945 were divided by Ho Chi Minh, and the northern Vietnamese only received one third while the Chinese soldiers were given two thirds. For 15 days elections were postponed by Ho Chi Minh in response to a demand by Chinese general Chen Xiuhe on 18 December 1945 so that the Chinese could get the Dong Minh Hoi and VNQDD to prepare. The Chinese left only in April–June 1946. Ho Chi Minh gave golden smoking paraphernalia and a golden opium pipe to Lu Han after gold week and purchased weapons with what was left of the proceeds. Starving Vietnamese were dying throughout northern Vietnam in 1945 due to the Japanese seizure of their crops, by the time the Chinese came to disarm the Japanese, Vietnamese corpses were all throughout the streets of Hanoi and had to be cleaned up by students. While Chiang Kai-shek, Xiao Wen (Hsiao Wen) and the Chinese central government were disinterested in occupying Vietnam beyond the allotted time period and involving itself in the war between the Viet Minh and the French, Lu Han held the opposite view and wanted to occupy Vietnam to prevent the French returning and establish a Chinese trusteeship of Vietnam under the principles of the Atlantic Charter with the aim of eventually preparing Vietnam for independence and blocking the French from returning. Ho sent a cable on 17 October 1945 to American president Harry S. Truman calling on him, Chiang Kai-shek, Premier Stalin and Premier Attlee to go to the United Nations against France and demand France not be allowed to return to occupy Vietnam, accusing France of having sold out and cheated the Allies by surrendering Indochina to Japan and that France had no right to return. Ho Chi Minh dumped the blame on Dong Minh Hoi and VNQDD for signing the agreement with France for returning its soldiers to Vietnam after he had to do it himself.

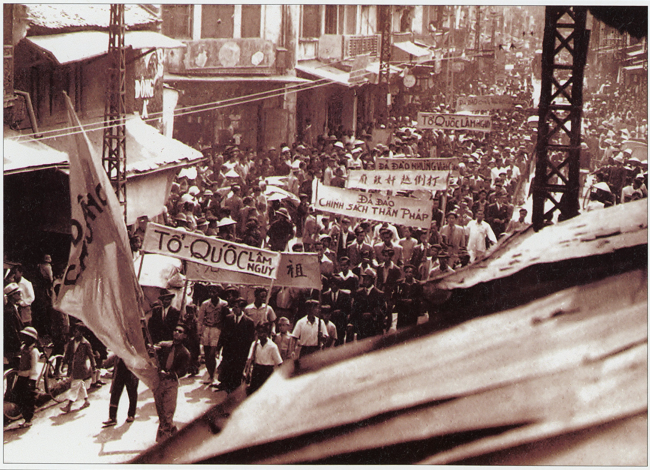
Demonstration on a Hanoi street with slogans opposing the government's policy of accommodation toward France, reading “The Fatherland is in danger”, “Down with pro-French policy”, February 1946.

Ho Chi Minh's Viet Minh tried to organize welcome parades for Chinese soldiers in northern Vietnam and covered for instances of bad behavior by warlord soldiers, trying to reassure Vietnamese that the warlord troops of Lu Han were only there temporarily and that China supported Vietnam's independence. Viet Minh newspapers said that the same ancestors (huyết thống) and culture were shared by Vietnamese and Chinese and that the Chinese heroically fought Japan, as had the Vietnamese. Ho forbade his soldiers like Trần Huy Liệu in Phú Thọ from attacking Chinese soldiers and Ho even surrendered Vietnamese who attacked Chinese soldiers to be executed as punishment in the Ro-Nha incident in Kiến An district on 6 March 1946 after Hồ Đức Thành and Đào Văn Biểu, special commissioners sent from Hanoi by Ho's DRV examined the case. Ho appeased and granted numerous concessions to the Chinese soldiers to avoid the possibility of them clashing with the Viet Minh, with him ordering Vietnamese not to carry out anything against Chinese soldiers and pledging his life on his promise, hoping the Chinese would disarm the Japanese soldiers and finish their mission as fast as possible.

=== Hải Phòng skirmish and Chinese withdrawal ===
Haiphong skirmish (1946)
- Part of the Chinese occupation of northern Vietnam, 1945–1946
Date	6 March 1946
Location	Haiphong
Result	Ceasefire

Belligerents
Provisional Government of the French Republic: French Indochina	Republic of China

Commanders and leaders
André Jubelin	Wang Lihuan

Casualties and losses
32 dead 40 wounded	36 dead 42 badly wounded

== Aftermath ==
On March 18, 1946, North Vietnam sent a delegation to Chongqing to maintain good relations with the Republic of China. The withdrawal of Chinese troops from North Vietnam occurred gradually and was completed on 15 June 1946. The coexistence between the DRV and the French, combined with the withdrawal of the Chinese nationalists, advantaged the Viet Minh while significantly undermining the Vietnamese nationalist partisans.

== See also ==
- Civil conflicts in Vietnam (1945–1949)
- War in southern Vietnam (1945–1946)
- First Indochina War
