= Trương Đình Tri =

Vietnamese politician assassinated in 1947

Doctor Trương Đình Tri
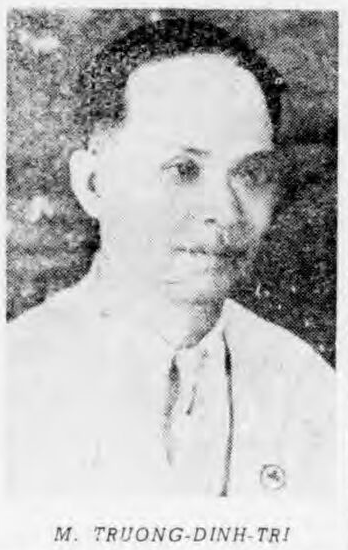

Chairman of the People's Security Council of Tonkin
- In office 1947 – 10 October 1947
- Preceded by: Post established
- Succeeded by: Post abolished

1st Minister of Social Affairs
- In office 2 March 1946 – 3 November 1946
- Preceded by: Himself (as Minister of Health)
- Succeeded by: Hoàng Tích Trý (as Minister of Health)

2nd Minister of Health
- In office 1 January 1946 – 2 March 1946
- Preceded by: Phạm Ngọc Thạch
- Succeeded by: Himself (as Minister of Social Affairs)

Personal details
- Died: October 10, 1947 Hà Nội, Tonkin, French Indochina
- Cause of death: Assassination
- Party: Vietnamese Revolutionary League
- Awards: Légion d'honneur
- Central institution membership: 1946: 1st National Assembly

Trương Đình Tri (? - 10 October 1947) was a doctor and the second Minister of Health of the Democratic Republic of Vietnam. He was assassinated by the Viet Minh in the early stages of the First Indochina War.

== Life & career ==
According to the National Assembly's official website, Dr. Tri was born on 12 May 1923, of Mường ethnicity and was the delegate representing Hòa Bình province. The veracity of this information is undetermined. He trained as a doctor at the Indochina Medical College.

On January 1, 1946, the Central Committee of the Communist Party and the Provisional Government, headed by Chairman Hồ Chí Minh, decided to establish a provisional coalition government with the participation of some members of the Vietnamese Nationalist Party and the Vietnamese Revolutionary League. Dr. Trương Đình Tri, a member of the League, was appointed Minister of Health.

On March 2, 1946, the first session of the 1st National Assembly of the Democratic Republic of Vietnam was held in Hà Nội, approving the list of 70 delegates from the Vietnamese Nationalist Party and the Vietnamese Revolutionary League to be added to the National Assembly. Following this, the National Assembly unanimously agreed to establish a coalition government for resistance, replacing the provisional coalition government. The Ministry of Social Affairs was formed by merging the Ministry of Health, the Ministry of Labor, and the Ministry of Social Relief; Dr. Trương Đình Tri was appointed Minister of Social Affairs (abbreviated) (Note: Full form: Minister of Social Affairs, Health, Relief and Labor.) - the only Vietnamese Minister of this title to date. From March 27, Dr. Vũ Đình Tụng was appointed Director of the Central Health Office under the Ministry of Social Affairs.

Dr. Tri attended the first interpellation session of the National Assembly in his capacity as Minister of Social Affairs. At this point, Vice Chairman Nguyễn Hải Thần, Minister of Foreign Affairs Nguyễn Tường Tam, and Vice Chairman of the Military Commission Vũ Hồng Khanh had already abandoned their posts.

Questioning the Minister of Social Affairs, Ms. Nguyễn Thị Thục Viên, a delegate from Hà Nội, asked: "Why is there no control over the price and quality of medicine?" Dr. Trương Đình Tri replied: "That is very regrettable, but there is nothing we can do about it because there is no price regulation council. Since Japan mounted a coup against the French, medicines have flooded the market in all chaotic manner." The minister stated that he had instructed dealers still holding onto non-toxic and common medicines to declare them and only be allowed to sell them until the end of 1946. “We have already vetoed a decree for controlling the quality of medicines, especially injectable drugs. Any complaints will be carefully considered,” Dr. Tri added.

In October 1946, the 1st National Assembly, in its second session, heard Chairman Hồ Chí Minh present to the National Assembly the list of members in the new government to replace the resistance coalition government, excluding figures from the Vietnamese Nationalist Party and the Vietnamese Revolutionary League such as Dr. Trương Đình Tri. However, according to journalist Kiều Mai Sơn, Dr. Tri himself withdrew from the post of minister in the new government.

== Assassination ==
After the French reoccupied Hà Nội, Dr. Trương Đình Tri was designated the Chairman of the People's Security Council of Tonkin. A French paper, however, labeled him the "Chairman of the Hà Nội Administrative Management Committee". He was assassinated by Trần Bình, 19 years old, and Đặng Đình Kỳ, 24, officers in the "operations" team of the Việt Minh Public Security's 6th District, on the afternoon of October 10, 1947 in Hà Nội. At 3 PM, the two assassins (having studied his routine), one armed with a Browning pistol and an explosive grenade, another carrying a "Côn Bát" (Note: A Colt?) and an incendiary grenade, ambushed Tri near his residence at 8 Hàng Mã Street (Hoàn Kiếm District). Both grenades had their pins removed and were wrapped in newspaper. As Tri and his bodyguard got into the car, the two rushed from their position, threw the grenades at the vehicle, and then withdrew safely. The driver and the bodyguard died instantly, while Tri was seriously wounded and later died at the French Army Hospital in Đồn Thủy (now Central Military Hospital 108).

This was shocking as Nguyễn Văn Sâm (Director of the newspaper "Thần Chung"), Chairman of the Association of Annamite Journalists of Cochinchina, a former Imperial Commissioner of Cochinchina appointed by Emperor Bảo Đại and then serving as Diplomatic Representative of the Autonomous Republic of Cochinchina, was murdered in Chợ Lớn the day after. He was a key member of the delegation to the Old Emperor in Hong Kong shortly before his death.

According to a French newspaper writing in French, the doctor was riddled with grenade fragments, and had to undergo immediate surgery but could not survive in spite of the care he received. The French High Commissioner in Indochina, Émile Bollaert, arrived at Dr. Tri's bedside to award him the Legion of Honor. A reward of 30,000 piastres was offered to anyone who helped find the assassins. A radio station belonging to the Việt Minh announced:

Trương Đình Tri and Nguyễn Văn Sâm, two traitors, have both been sentenced to death by a military tribunal. The sentences are now being carried out.

Prolific characters who sent condolence messages by 19 October 1947, publicized by the "Tia Sáng" newspaper, included: Trần Văn Tỷ (Director of the People's Security Council of Annam), general Pierre Boyer De Latour du Moulin (Interim Commissioner of Cochinchina), Đặng Hữu Chí (Director of the People's Security Council of Hải Phòng), Marius Moutet (Minister of the Overseas), (Note: Mislabeled as Foreign Minister.) De Redon (former Mayor of Đà Lạt), the "Quốc Hồn" newspaper in Sài Gòn.

Bảo Đại expressed the same sentiment on the murders of Dr. Tri and Mr. Sâm on the 17th. The paper "Tia Sáng" compared Dr. Tri's situation to an official under Emperor Lê Chiêu Thống named Đinh Nhạ Hành, as the doctor was stated to be a believer in constitutional monarchy.

On April 23, 1949, Chairman Hồ Chí Minh allegedly signed Decree No. 22 or No. 23-SL, awarding the Feat Order, First Class, to both assassins. This was the first time that cadres in the Hà Nội Public Security force had received the highest medal from the Chairman. The date and award are commonly misreported as Bình and Kỳ were conferred the Resistance Order, First Class, on 25 April by Decree No. 32-SL. Trần Bình was apprehended, tortured, and received a double death sentence in 1948 from the French authorities for plotting to murder a high-ranking secret service chief along with killing Dr. Tri.
