= Đại Việt Duy Dân Đảng =

Greater Viet Duy dân Revolutionary Party Đại Việt Duy Dân Cách mệnh Đảng 大越維民革命黨
- Abbreviation: Duy-dân
- Chairman: Nghiêm Xuân Hồng
- Spokesperson: Nghiêm Xuân Hồng
- Founder: Lý Đông A
- Founded: 15 September 1937 (informally); 1 January 1943 (officially)
- Dissolved: 1947
- Preceded by: Thắng Nghĩa Học Hội; Vietnam National Restoration League
- Headquarters: Nga My, Ninh Bình
- Newspaper: Thắng Nghĩa
- Youth wing: Học Xã
- Ideology: Vietnamese nationalism Anti-communism
- Political position: Far-right

Website
- Thangnghia.org

The Đại Việt Duy Dân Cách mệnh Đảng (大越維民革命黨, "Greater Viet Duy dân Revolutionary Party", with Duy dân variously translated as 'For people', 'Humanist', 'Populist', 'Unicity of the people'), or simply Duy dân Party, was a nationalist and anti-communist political party and militant organisation that was active in Vietnam from 1943 to 1947.

== History ==
Its name Đại Việt Duy Dân Cách mệnh Đảng come from a saying of Phan Bội Châu the spiritual leader of the organization : "I am neither a materialist nor idealist, but duy dân" (Ta chẳng duy vật, ta chẳng duy tâm, ta chỉ duy dân). Lý Đông A later developed his theory as Duy dân chủ nghĩa.

=== Establishment (1937 – 1943) ===
The initial ideas of the Đại Việt Duy Dân Đảng were formed on September 15, 1937. A small group of secret members of the Vietnam Nation-Building Army (Note: Việt Nam phục quốc quân.) issued a declaration of establishment of their organization in Hòa Bình Province. However, the conditions of that time did not yet allow this organization to have any specific activities.

The Party was established officially on January 1, 1943, in Hòa Bình Province. A nearby hill, where a Mường hamlet called Mơ village, now part of Gia Sơn, Ninh Bình, was also named Nga My. Within months, the base became the party's headquarters, dubbed the Nga My War Zone.

Despite his role as party leader and responsibility for designing the political ideology, Lý Đông A was said to have never appeared at public meetings. The person considered to be the leader in reality was Nghiêm Xuân Hồng.

=== Development (1943 – 1947) ===
From 1942 to 1943, Lý Đông A still remained in exile and even served time in prison in Kunming along with several other nationalist revolutionaries as Nguyễn Tường Tam, Nghiêm Kế Tổ... They agreed to form an open political party in Vietnam, but as a semi-legal representative of the Vietnam National Restoration League, which had been banned under Indochinese law because of its longstanding anti-French stance. After the Japanese coup d'état in French Indochina, Đại Việt Duy Dân Đảng has temporarily joined the Daiviet National Alliance, (Note: Đại Việt Quốc gia Liên minh.) a political grouping of the Daiviet National Socialist Party. Although the organization had a large number of political parties, in reality only Daiviet National Socialist Party and Đại Việt Duy Dân Đảng were active, because most of Vietnamese politicians "hated Japan as much as France". (Note: Nguyễn Huy Tưởng, Sống mãi với thủ đô (Living Forever With the Capital), Văn Học Publishing, Hanoi, 1961.)

When the Empire of Vietnam was dissolved on August 30, 1945, Đại Việt Duy Dân Đảng continued to operate as the legal representative of the Vietnam National Restoration League in Vietnam to avoid the scandal of "having collaborated with the Japanese". It joined unofficially the National Union Front (Note: Mặt trận Thống nhất Quốc gia Liên hiệp) of nationalist parties. The National Union Front and League for Independence of Vietnam soon became rivals in building the Government of the Democratic Republic of Vietnam. Đại Việt Duy Dân Đảng was also a member of the Vietnam Revolutionary League, (Note: Việt Nam Cách mệnh Đồng minh Hội) an organization by Nguyễn Hải Thần that had in fact completely replaced the Vietnam National Restoration League since 1945, but due to its internal instability and many other reasons it did not participate much in politics. By 1946, the Vietnam Revolutionary League also officially joined the National Union Front. This event strengthened the nationalist forces, thus causing concern among the Việt Minh leaders.

On September 5, 1945, Võ Nguyên Giáp was authorized to sign Decree 08 on behalf of the President of the Democratic Republic of Vietnam to dissolve Đại Việt National Socialist Party and Đại Việt Nationalist Party. These two parties were the de facto core of two nationalist fronts opposing Việt Minh. Although the decree was only symbolic, it actually opened a period of brutal struggle between Vietnamese political organizations in the area of Hanoi from 1945 until early 1947.

During this chaotic period, Lý Đông A decided to bring the Đại Việt Duy Dân Đảng to Hòa Bình to consolidate their war zone. They clashed three times with Việt Minh forces during the three years.

- Battle at Nga-my hill (1945): By 1945–1946, Đại Việt Duy Dân had clashed Viet Minh in many bloody battles.
- Battle at Hoa-binh province (1946): In the Hòa Bình Province battle they were vanquished by Viet Minh in 1946.
- The death of Lý Đông-a (1947): The founder, Lý Đông A, was kidnapped in 1947 and disappeared at Mai Đà Wharf.

=== Succession (1953 – present) ===
After the organization was disbanded, some of the remaining members soon moved to Hà Nội and Hải Phòng early before the 1954 exodus. In 1953, when the Personalist Labor Revolutionary Party was founded in Hanoi, its founder Ngô Đình Nhu recruited a number of people from this party to form a political research and ideological design group. That is why Thắng Nghĩa Học Hội ("Thắng Nghĩa" study association) was re-established. However, this group of scholars quickly became dissatisfied with the policies of the First Republic regime and were gradually seen as opposing the government. Many were arrested.

In the times of post November 1 Revolutionary, Thắng Nghĩa Học Hội was re-established a second time. However, the group of Duy Dân scholars only attempted to restore Lý Đông A's legacy through the publication of books. The organization continued to follow its former members to the United States after 1975 and exists today, but no longer includes political functions.

== Structure ==
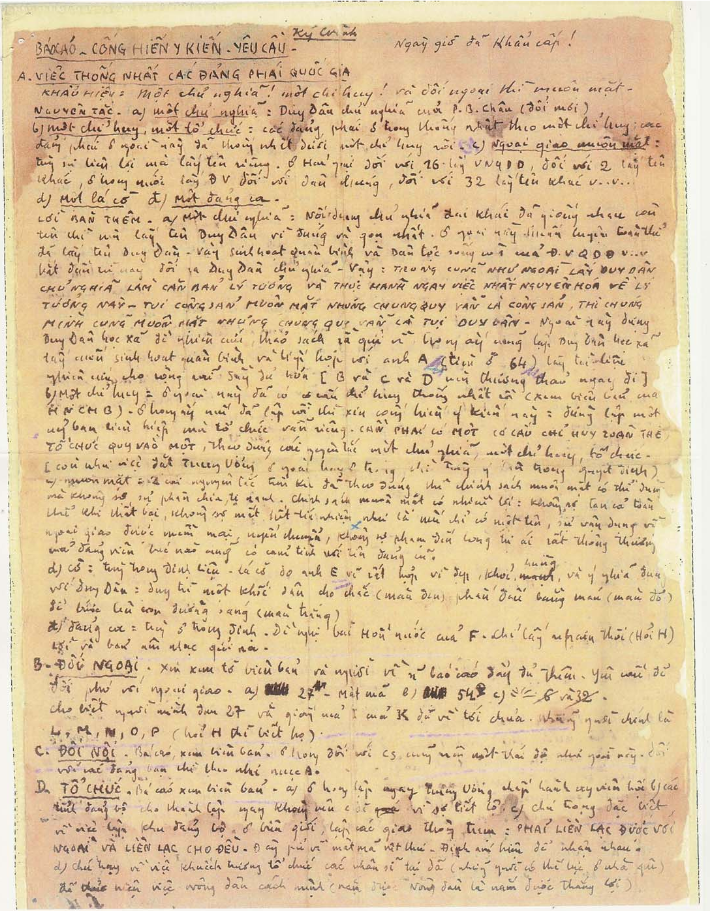
The autograph...

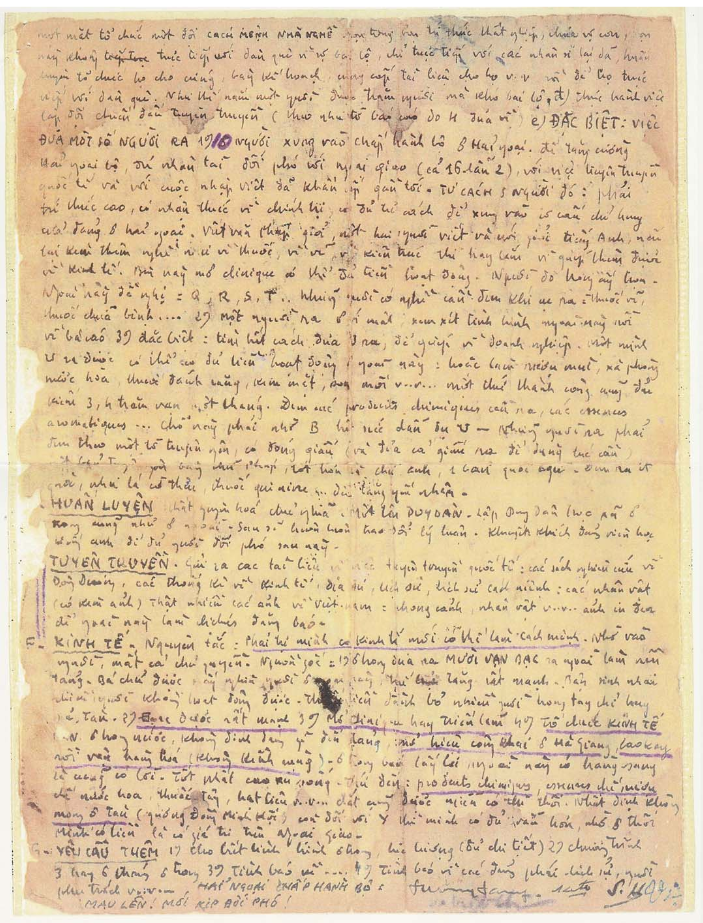
... of leader Lý Đông A.

Notable members:

- Lý Đông A (1921–1947) : Secretary General, a leader in secret.
- Nghiêm Xuân Hồng : The second thinker, a leader in public.
- Trần Việt Hoài
- Phạm Khắc Hàm
- Đỗ Thái Nhiên
- Nguyễn Cảnh Hậu
- Dương Thanh Phong

== See also ==
- Daiviet Nationalist Party
- Vietnam Nationalist Party
- Civil conflicts in Vietnam (1945–1949)

== Notes and references ==
=== Primary sources ===
- Lý Đông A, Ký trình: Ngày giờ đã khẩn cấp!, Liuzhou, Guangxi, China, 1943.
- Lý Đông A, Tuyên ngôn ngày thành lập Việt Duy Dân Đảng, Hoa-Binh, Tonkin, Indochina, 1943.

=== Bibliography ===
- Guillemot, François (2012) [2009]. "Penser le nationalisme révolutionnaire au Việt Nam : Identités politiques et itinéraires singuliers à la recherche d'une hypothétique « Troisième voie »". Moussons (13–14) (online ed.): 174–184. doi:10.4000/moussons.1043.
- Nguyễn Mạnh Hùng, ed. (2022). Đảng phái quốc gia Việt Nam 1945–1954, Lời kể của nhân chứng: Đại Việt Duy Dân Đảng. Vietnam-America Research and Education Fund. ISBN 9798765540800.
  - Online resource
- Shiraishi, Masaya (2004). The Vietnamese Phuc Quoc League and the 1940 Insurrection. Working Paper. Vol. 14. Center of Excellence–Contemporary Asian Studies, Waseda University.
- Ernest Ming-tak Leung (author) & Ngọc Giao (translator), Trường đại-học kiến-thiết tương-lai Á-châu (The school that built Asia), Hanoi, Vietnam, 2022.
