= Việt gian =

Term for a Vietnamese traitor

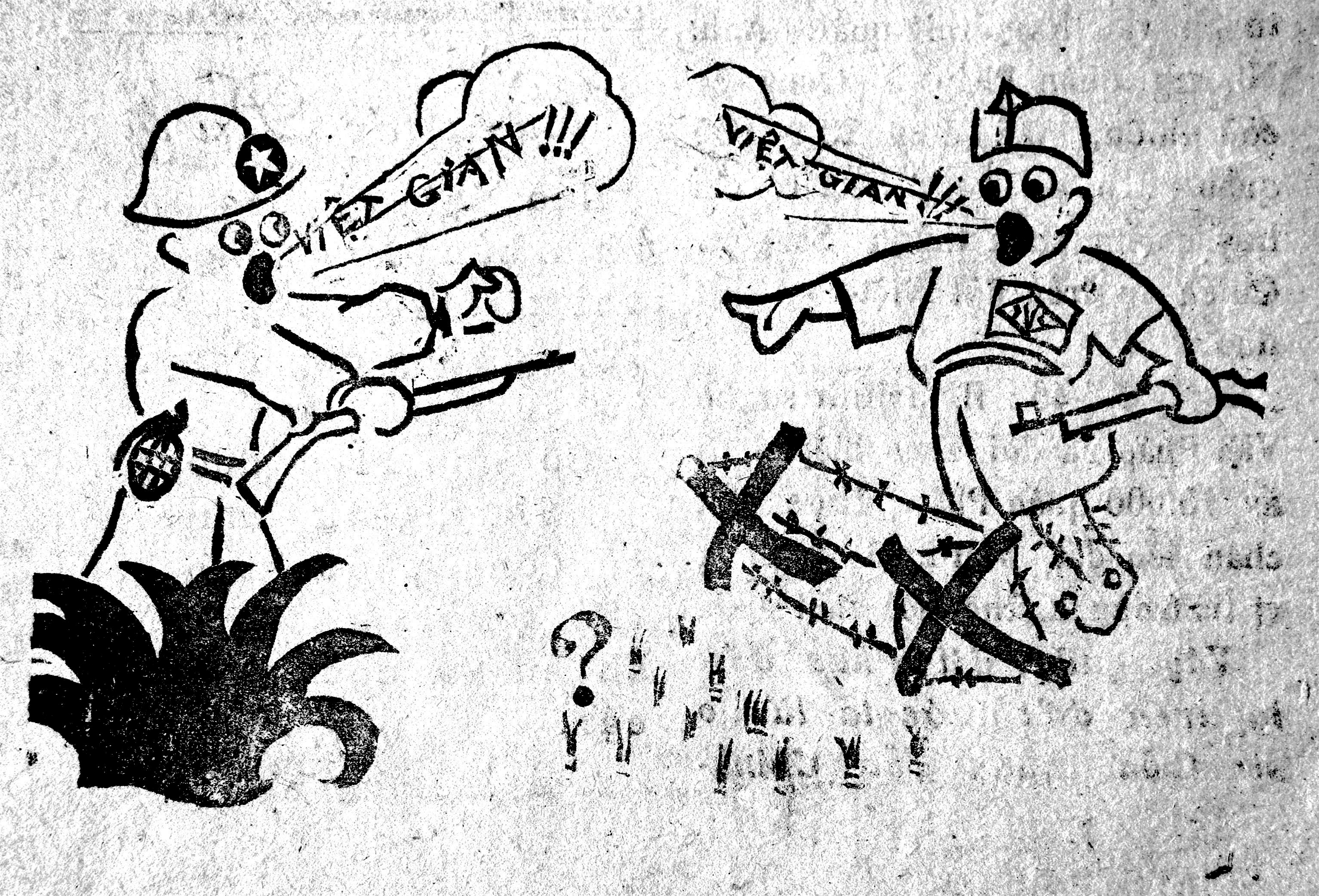
A Viet Minh soldier and an anti-communist nationalist soldier, wearing a salacot and calot respectively, accuse each other of being Việt gian. Drawing from a nationalist newspaper in Huế, June 1947

Việt gian (chữ Hán: 越奸; lit. 'Vietnamese traitor') is a pejorative term referring to a Vietnamese person who betrays, compromises or acts against the interests of Vietnam. The term Việt gian first appeared in 1938, denoting Vietnamese who supported or would benefit from the Empire of Japan, in a manner similar to the Chinese term Hanjian.

Since 1945, the term has been employed extensively in the context of the Vietnamese civil conflicts, with both opposing sides, the communist-led Viet Minh and the anti-communist nationalists, mutually applying it to one another. It continued to be used during the Vietnam War between North and South Vietnam.

== North Vietnam ==
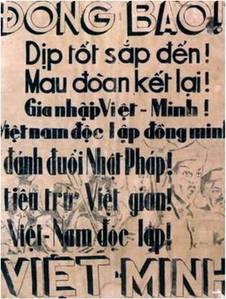
1945 Viet Minh propaganda poster calls for the eradication of the Việt gian.

Since 1945, alleged Việt gian and kẻ phản động (lit. 'reactionaries') were detained, subjected to humiliation and beatings, and in some cases, killed. The majority of cases were carried out by the Viet Minh, while a smaller number were conducted by nationalist parties.

Part of the Viet Minh's strategy to consolidate power involved terrorizing and purging rival Vietnamese nationalist groups. The policies of the Viet Minh include "arming the people, punishing the Việt gian" and "confiscation of the assets of the French and Japanese imperialists and the Việt gian". Employing the term Việt gian, the DRV government had no consensus on its meaning. A 1946 article from the Catholic periodical Đa Minh condemned the loose use of the accusation Việt gian, remarking: "Who is deceitful (gian) and who upright (ngay) will be answered by time and history". On January 20, 1953, Ho Chi Minh issued Order No. 133-SL in North Vietnam to punish the Việt gian.

== South Vietnam ==
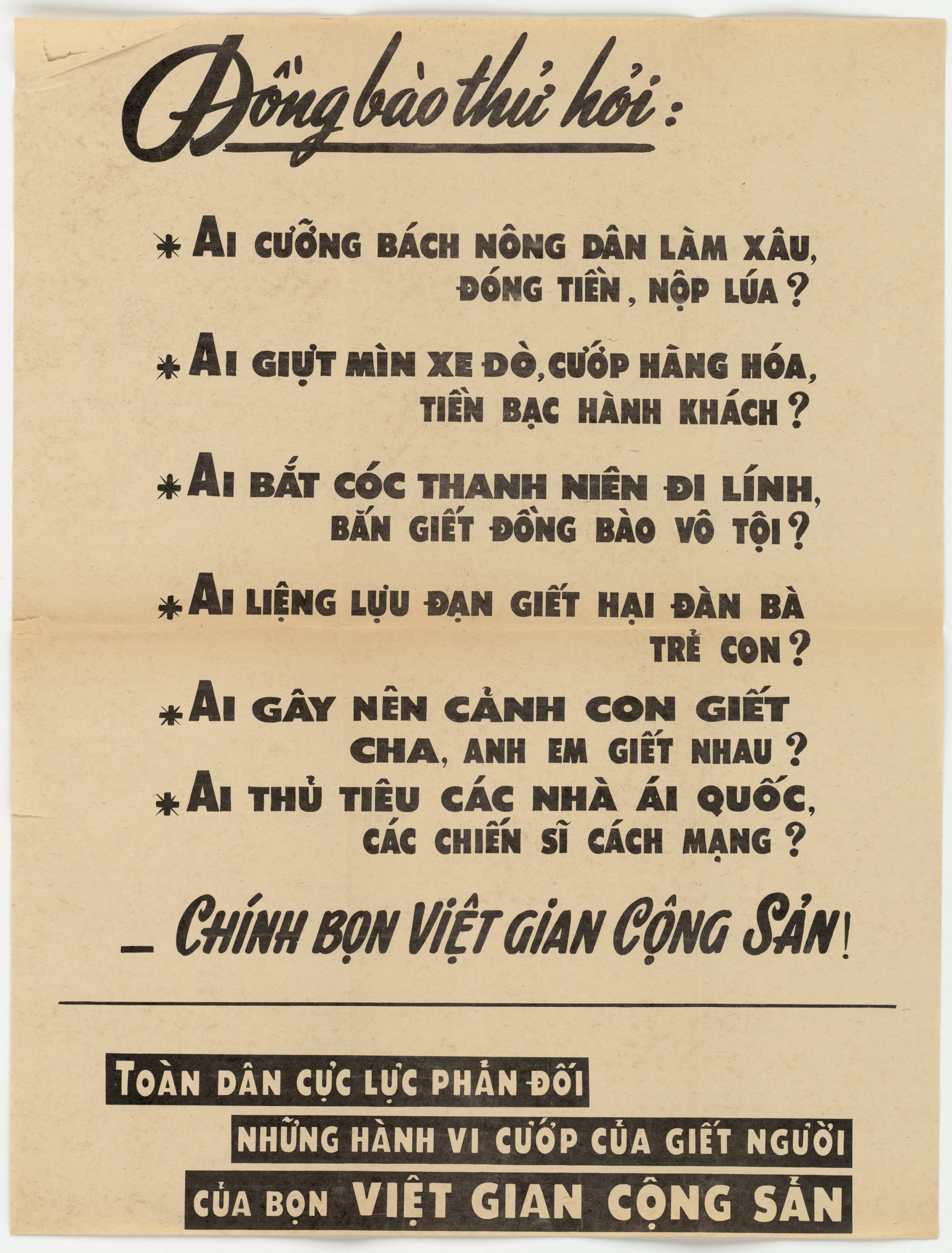
South Vietnam propaganda poster uses the phrase Việt gian cộng sản.

It is sometimes interpreted that the term "Việt Cộng" is a contraction of the term Việt gian cộng sản (lit. 'Communist traitor to Vietnam' or 'Vietnamese Communist traitor').

== See also ==
- Counter-revolutionary
- Reactionary
- Race traitor
- Indochina wars
