= Trình Minh Thế =

Vietnamese nationalist and religious military leader (1920–1955)

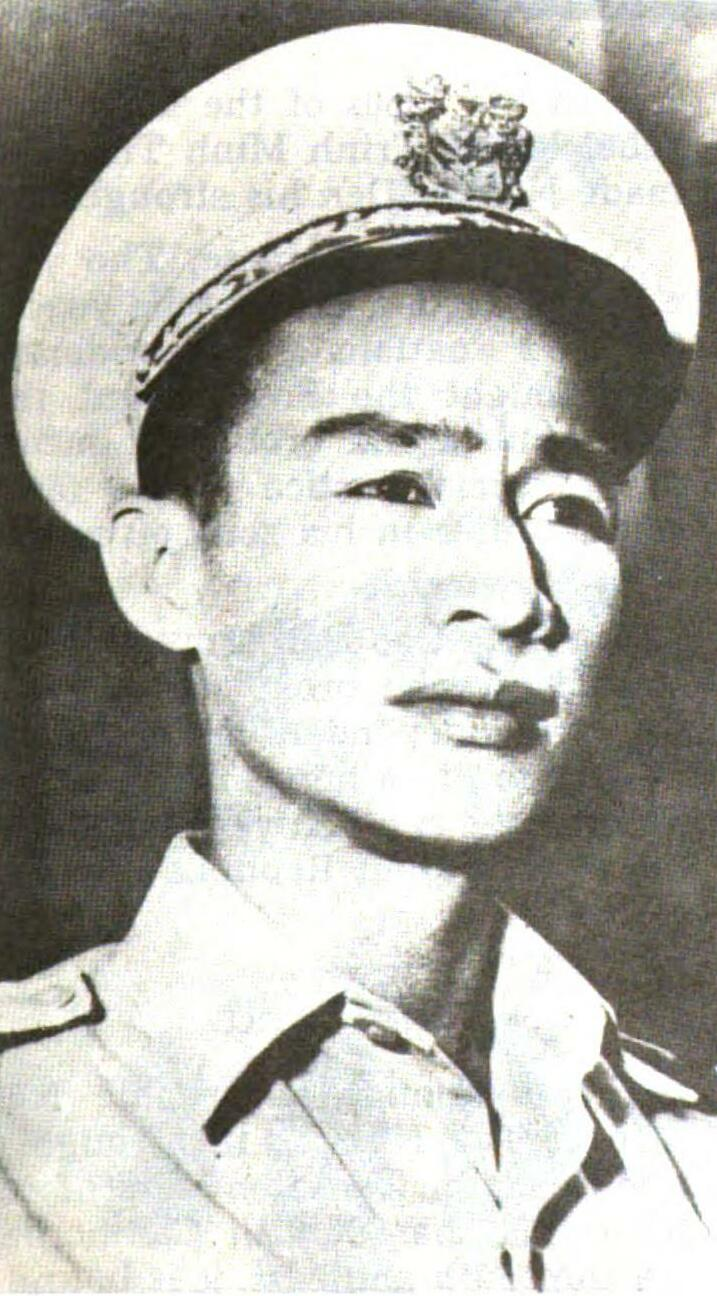

Personal details
- Born: 1920 Tây Ninh province, French Cochinchina
- Died: 3 May 1955 (aged 34–35) Saigon, South Vietnam
- Cause of death: Killed-in-action

Military service
- Allegiance: Vietnamese National Army; Caodaist Armed Forces
- Years of service: 1940-1955
- Rank: Lieutenant general (posthumous)
- Battles/wars: Battle of Saigon (1955)

Trình Minh Thế (1920 – 3 May 1955) was a Vietnamese nationalist and Cao Dai military leader during the end of the First Indochina War and the beginning of the Vietnam War.

== Early life ==
Thế was born in Tây Ninh Province and raised in the Cao Đài religion. He was trained in military officer school by the Japanese Kempeitai when Japan began using Cao Đài paramilitary troops. By 1945, he was an officer in the Cao Đài militia.

== Career ==
In June 1951, Thế broke from the Cao Đài hierarchy and took about 2,000 troops with him to form his own militia, the Liên Minh, devoted to combating both the French and the Việt Minh. Thế's father and one of his brothers formed their own military group in the Liên Minh and were later killed in combat by Việt Minh.

Thế's forces were implicated in a series of terrorist bombings in Saigon from 1951 to 1953—which were blamed on communists at the time—and may also have been responsible for the assassination of the French General Chanson at Sa Đéc in 1951.

In 1954, United States military advisor Edward Lansdale negotiated with Thế to use his militia to back up Ngô Đình Diệm and the ARVN. On 13 February 1955, Thế's troops were officially integrated into the South Vietnamese army, where he assumed the rank of general. He led the Liên Minh on a triumphal march into Saigon.

Through Lansdale, the U.S. continued to fund Thế and other Caodaist groups. However, as the South Vietnamese government faltered, many of the militia leaders declared their open opposition to Diệm and began an attempted coup. Thế's loyalties at this point were unclear, and it was also unclear whether the U.S. intended to support Diệm against the rebels; some said that Thế might be a realistic replacement for Diệm. However, when the Liên Minh entered Saigon again it appeared to be in response to Lansdale's last-minute call for them to protect Diệm.

== Death ==
On 3 May 1955, while standing near his military jeep, Thế was shot in the back of the head by a sniper. The murder was unsolved, with some blaming the French (who had vowed to kill Thế for years) and others blaming the South Vietnamese government. Trình Minh Sơn, Thế's son, claims that his father was killed from a pistol with its muzzle against his head. He also claims that he was shot by two bullets, not one bullet as stated by official media. His son says it was possible that Thế was assassinated by the South Vietnamese government to prevent him from forming the basis of a possible future opposition to the government.

== See also ==
- The Quiet American (1955 novel) – Thế himself does not make an appearance, but he and his forces are a major part of the plot.
