= Nguyễn Thành Phương =

Vietnamese general

Nguyễn Thành Phương was a Vietnamese general under the Cao Đài sect and was in command of 25,000 soldiers.
