= André Jubelin =

French naval aviator

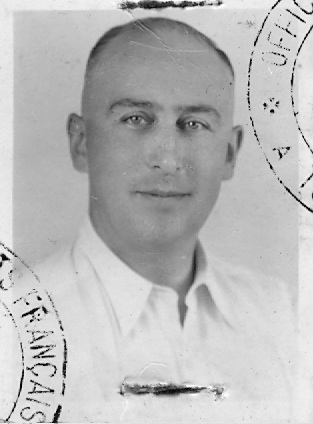
- Born: 26 July 1906; Toulon, France
- Died: 7 May 1986 (aged 79); Sanary-sur-Mer, France
- Military career
- Allegiance: France
- Branch: French Navy
- Rank: Rear Admiral

Rear Admiral André Jubelin (28 July 1906, Toulon – 7 May 1986, Sanary-sur-mer) was a French naval aviator who served with distinction in the French navy and the Fleet Air Arm during World War II. He was a pioneer of aircraft carrier operations, and after the war commanded the French aircraft carrier Arromanches.

== Bibliography ==
- Jubelin, A.: The Flying Sailor, London: Hurst & Blackett (1953). First published in France as Marin de Métier – Pilote de Fortune, Éditions France-Empire (1951).
