= Vũ Hồng Khanh =

Vietnamese revolutionary (1898–1993)

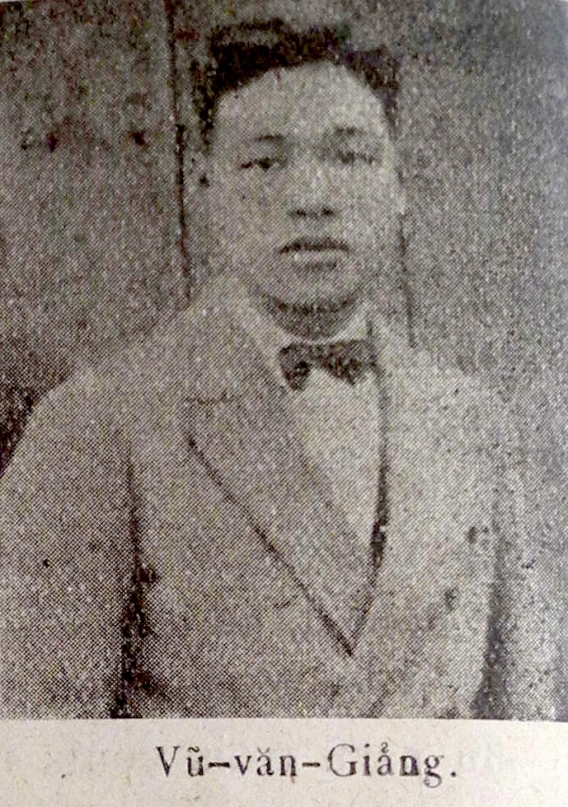

Minister of Sports and Youth of the State of Vietnam
- In office 1952–1953
- Prime Minister: Nguyễn Văn Tâm

Vice Chairman of National Resistance Commission
- In office 2 March 1946 – July 1946
- Chairman: Võ Nguyên Giáp
- Preceded by: Position established
- Succeeded by: Vacant

Leader of Việt Nam Quốc Dân Đảng
- In office 1930–1975
- Preceded by: Nguyễn Thái Học

Personal details
- Born: 1898 Vĩnh Phúc province, French Indochina
- Died: 14 November 1993 (aged 94–95) Vĩnh Phúc, Vietnam
- Party: VNQDĐ

Vũ Hồng Khanh (chữ Hán: 武鴻卿, 1898 – 14 November 1993) born Vũ Văn Giảng (武文講) or Vũ Văn Giản (武文簡), was a Vietnamese revolutionary and leader of the Việt Nam Quốc Dân Đảng faction.

== Biography ==
Born and later became a village teacher in Tonkin (Northern Vietnam), in the early 1920s, he was soon persuaded by Nguyen Khac Nhu to join the revolutionary path and became an active member of the Việt Nam Dân Quốc movement. In early 1928, It merged with the Việt Nam Quốc Dân Đảng (Vietnamese Nationalist Party). He became one of the key figures of the Party that was formed in late 1927. He joined the 1930 Yên Bái mutiny against French colonialists. He left Vietnam for Yunnan in China during the French colonial crackdown of 1930 and enrolled in a Kuomintang military school in Kunming. He graduated and was granted a commission in the Nationalist Chinese Twentieth Army Corps, where he rose quickly to the rank of brigadier general. In 1941 he took on the role of head of a school training Vietnamese, Burmese and Thai recruits. He became the vice-president of the "Government of National Unity" from March to October 1946. He later left the government and went into exile in China due to communist repression. During the First Indochina War, he supported Bảo Đại Solution to fight communism and gain independence in peace and freedom for Vietnam. In late December 1949, the Chinese Communist Party defeated the Kuomintang throughout China and forced the remnants of the Việt Nam Quốc Dân Đảng to flee to the Vietnamese border. Vũ Hồng Khanh led about seven to eight thousand remnants of the party into Vietnam via Nacham [Nà Sản?], between Lạng Sơn and Cao Bằng. When the French garrison attempted to disarm this army, a clash broke out. Surrounded and attacked by both the French and the Viet Minh, losing about two thousand men in the clashes, on January 6, 1950, Vũ Hồng Khanh and the remaining remnants laid down their arms and surrendered to the French.

In 1952, Vũ Hồng Khanh served as Minister of Sports and Youth in the Nguyễn Văn Tâm cabinet of the anti-communist and capitalistic State of Vietnam. After communists gained power in the North, he later led a faction of the Việt Nam Quốc Dân Đảng in South Vietnam. During the Vietnam War, he supported the Republic of Vietnam against the communists. He was leader of the party from 1942 to 1975.

In 1975, when South Vietnam fell to the communists, he was forced to go to a re-education camp. After being released and only under surveillance, Khanh retired to his home village of Thổ Tang, modern Vĩnh Tường District. In 1992, he was allowed by the government to enter Hồ Chí Minh City to visit his daughter. He later died in Thổ Tang at the age of 95.

According to Hoàng Văn Hoan in his memoir, Vũ Hồng Khanh and Nghiêm Kế Tổ held more real influence than Trương Bội Công and Nguyễn Hải Thần within the Nationalist Party, and he described Khanh and Tổ as "Chongqing's men".
