= Đại Việt National Socialist Party =

Đại Việt National Socialist Party Đại Việt Quốc gia Xã hội Đảng 大越國家社會黨
- Abbreviation: ĐVQXĐ
- Founder: Nguyễn Xuân Tiếu
- Founded: 1936
- Dissolved: 5 September 1945
- Preceded by: Vietnam National Restoration League
- Headquarters: Hanoi
- Newspaper: "Dân Báo" (People Daily News)
- Student wing: L'association Générale des Etudiants Indochinois
- Youth wing: L'association Jeune Annam
- Membership: 2,000 (1945)
- Ideology: Authoritarian nationalism Monarchism
- Political position: Far-right
- Colors

Standard of the Daiviet National Revolutionary Committee

The Đại Việt National Socialist Party (Vietnamese: Đại-Việt Quốc-gia Xã-hội Đảng, chữ Hán: 大越國家社會黨) was a nationalist political party founded in 1936 in Vietnam in the Hội Phục Việt (with the Vietnam Patriotic Party and Annam Nationalist Party), following nationalism, inspired by the Kempeitai. It was pro-Japanese, it also supported Vietnamese independence and unification under the Nguyễn dynasty. Its headquarters was located in Hanoi, Northern Vietnam (Tonkin).

== History ==
Đại Việt National Socialist Party was founded by Nguyễn Xuân Tiếu, and was a force with about 2,000 members, exerting influence in big cities such as Hanoi and Haiphong during that time World War II. This was a pro-Japanese political organization that supported the establishment of the Empire of Vietnam led by the Nguyễn Dynasty and Emperor Bảo Đại, who declared Vietnamese independence from France on 11 March 1945. The Empire of Vietnam also regained Cochinchina on 14 August. However, this state was only independent nominally i.e. a puppet state.

This was a group of the northern branch of the Vietnam National Restoration League (Việt Nam Phục quốc Đồng minh Hội), the southern branch was the pro-Japanese branch of Daiviet Nationalist Party, and associated with pro-Japanese groups in the Daiviet National League (Đại Việt Quốc gia Liên minh).

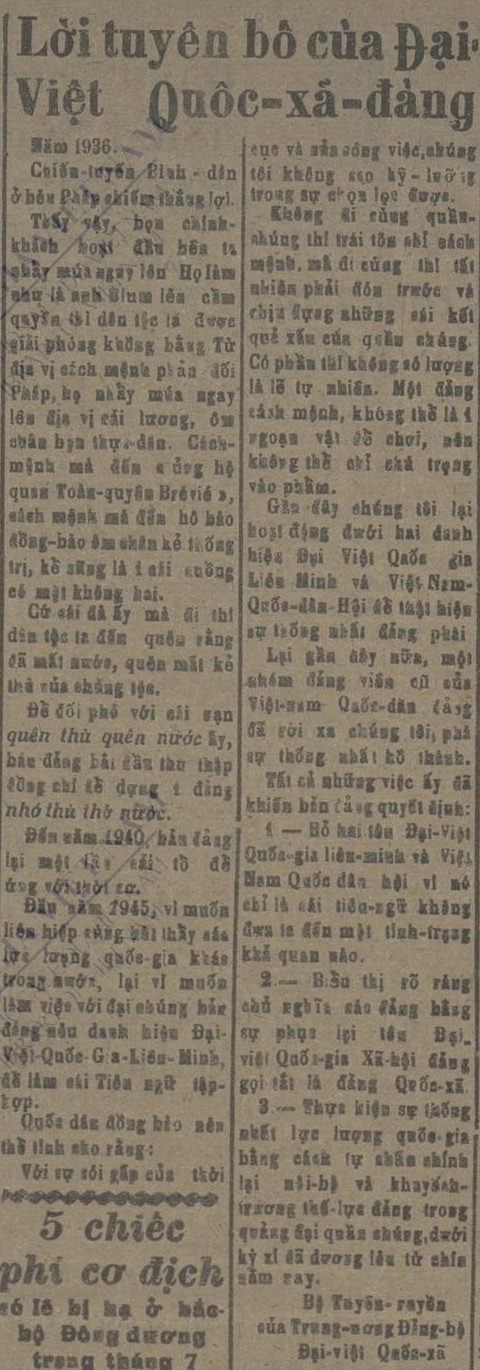
Đại Việt National Socialist Party announced the dissolution of the Daiviet National Alliance

== Dissolution ==
Three days after the declaration of independence on 2 September 1945, the Provisional Government of the Democratic Republic of Vietnam ordered the dissolution of Đại Việt National Socialist Party, accusing it of conspiring to conduct harmful activities independent background. Đại Việt National Socialist Party was accused of aiding foreign countries to endanger independence.

== See also ==
- French Social Party
