= Nguyễn Hải Thần =

Vietnamese political leader

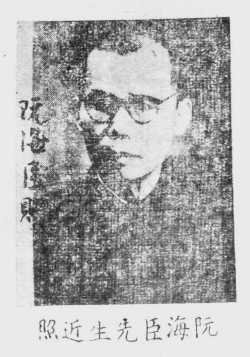
- Nguyễn Hải Thần in 1947

1st Vice President of Democratic Republic of Vietnam
- In office January 1946 – July 1946
- President: Ho Chi Minh
- Preceded by: Office established
- Succeeded by: Tôn Đức Thắng

President of Vietnamese Provisional National Government
- In office 28 August 1945 – 7 May 1946

Personal details
- Born: 1869 Thường Tín, Hà Đông, Tonkin (now Hanoi)
- Died: 1959 (aged 89–90) British Hong Kong
- Party: Vietnamese Revolutionary League
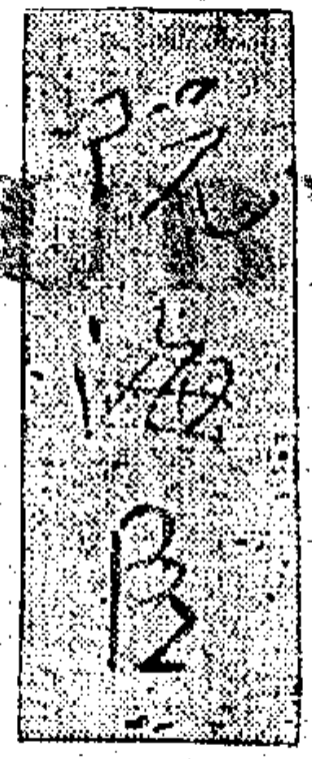
- Signature

Nguyễn Hải Thần (阮海臣; born Nguyễn Văn Thắng in Thường Tín District, Hà Đông Province, circa 1869; died 1959; also known as Vũ Hải Thu) was a leader of the Việt Nam Cách mạng Đồng minh Hội (Vietnamese Revolutionary Alliance) and a political leader during the Vietnamese Revolution. He was also the first Vice President of the Democratic Republic of Vietnam for less than a year before fleeing to China.

== Biography ==
In 1905, he left Vietnam to study at military academies, first in Japan and then in China, as part of Phan Bội Châu's Đông Du (Travel to the East) movement. In 1912, he joined Châu's Vietnam Restoration League (Việt Nam Quang Phục Hội) and became one of its representatives in Guangxi and one of its most capable military leaders.

After Châu's capture in 1925 that led to the league's demise, Thần and other revolutionaries in China founded the Việt Nam Cách Mạng Đồng Minh Hội. Thần was respected by many Chinese officials and overseas Vietnamese revolutionaries, and his views were usually held in high regards. Using his good relationship with Chiang Kai-shek, he lobbied for the release and pardon of Hồ Chí Minh when the latter was in jail waiting to be executed for "crimes against the French colonial government".

In August 1945, Hồ and the Communists seized the government from Emperor Bảo Đại and founded the Democratic Republic of Vietnam in September the same year. Thần briefly joined Hồ's coalition government that comprised several non-Communist party leaders. After Hồ signed a modus vivendi Marius Moutet (Minister of Overseas France and her Colonies), France was able to return to its former colony. The move bought Hồ precious time to deal with the non-communist military forces. As soon as the Chinese troops that had entered Vietnam to disarm the Japanese were replaced by French expeditionary forces, Hồ's Việt Minh attacked all non-communist bases in the country. Thần, who opposed Hồ's communist connections, fled to Nanjing, before departing for Hong Kong where he remained until his death in 1959. He supported the establishment of new Vietnamese state with Bảo Đại being its leader, this state would be the State of Vietnam.
