= French Indochina =

1887–1954 French territories in Southeast Asia

Indochinese Union Union Indochinoise (French) Liên bang Đông Dương (Vietnamese) 聯邦東洋 (Chữ Hán) ສະຫະພາບອິນດູຈີນ (Lao) សហភាពឥណ្ឌូចិន (Khmer) 印度支那聯邦 (Chinese)
- 1887–1945; 1946–1954
- Flag Emblem
- Motto: "Liberté, égalité, fraternité" "Liberty, Equality, Fraternity"
- Anthem: La Marseillaise ("The Marseillaise")
- Vietnamese-style seal of the Governor-General of French Indochina (Note: Used on Classical Chinese language documents, its inscription reads Đại Pháp Quốc Khâm mệnh Tổng thống Đông Dương Toàn quyền đại thần quan nho (大法國欽命總統東洋全權大臣關伩) written in seal script.)

- French Indochina in 1937
- Status: Colony of France (1887–1941; 1946–1949) occupation by the Empire of Japan (1941–1945); Associated states within the French Union (1949–1954)
- Capital: Saigon (1887–1902, 1945–1954); Hanoi (1902–1945)
- Common languages: French (official): Vietnamese; Tây Bồi; Khmer; Lao; Chinese
- Ethnic groups (1936): 72% Viet; 13% Khmer; 6% Tai (Lao, Tày, Thái, etc.); 1.4% Chinese and other Asiatics; 0.2% Europeans (French, etc.); 7.3% others (Montagnard, Cham, Muong, Hmong, Yao, Khmu, etc.; Diasporas: Malay, Indonesian, Indian, Arab, African, etc.)
- Religion: Buddhism; Confucianism; Folk religions; Vietnamese; Tai; Chinese; Taoism; Christianity; Hòa Hảo; Caodaism; Hinduism; Islam
- Demonym: Indochinese
- Type: Federation of French territories and protectorates (1887–1945; 1946–1949) Confederation of French associated states (1949–1954)
- Membership: Until 1949: Tonkin; Annam; Cochinchina; Cambodia; Laos; Guangzhouwan (–1945); From 1949 to 1954: State of Vietnam; Cambodia; Laos
- Governor-General
  - 1887–1888 (first): Ernest Constans
  - 1955–1956 (last): Henri Hoppenot (Note: As Commissioner-General)
- Historical era: New Imperialism and the Cold War
  - French conquest of Vietnam: 1858–1885
  - French Indochina established: 17 October 1887
  - Addition of Laos: 19 April 1899
  - Guangzhouwan added: 5 January 1900
  - Japanese invasion: 22 September 1940
  - Franco-Thai War: Oct. 1940 – May 1941
  - Japanese coup: 9 March 1945
  - DRV proclaimed: 2 September 1945
  - Reconquering Cochinchina: 23 September 1945
  - Ho–Sainteny Agreement: 6 March 1946
  - Indochina War: 19 December 1946
  - Élysée Accords: 8 March 1949
  - 1954 Geneva Conference: 21 July 1954

Area
  - Total: 737,000 km^{2} (285,000 sq mi)

Population
  - 1900: 15,164,500
  - 1937: 23,300,000
- Currency: French Indochinese piastre Since 1953: Cambodian riel, Lao kip, Vietnamese đồng
Preceded by
1887: Protectorate of Annam
Protectorate of Tonkin
French; Cochinchina
French protectorate of Cambodia
1889: Twelve Tai; Cantons
1898: Qing dynasty
1899: French protectorate of Laos
1900: Kouang-Tchéou-Wan
1904: Kingdom of Champasak
Kingdom of Siam
1945: Kingdom of Kampuchea
1946: Lao Issara
Thailand
Succeeded by
1941: Thailand
1945: Empire of Vietnam
Kingdom of Kampuchea
Kingdom of Luang Phrabang
Guangzhouwan
1946: French Union
1954: Democratic Republic of Vietnam
State of Vietnam
Kingdom of Cambodia
Kingdom of Laos
- Today part of: Vietnam; Laos; Cambodia; China ∟Zhanjiang

French Indochina (previously written as French Indo-China), (Note: French: Indochine française; Vietnamese: Đông Dương thuộc Pháp (IPA: [ɗoŋ zɯɤŋ tʰuə̂k fǎːp]), 東洋屬法, lit. 'East Ocean under France; Khmer: ឥណ្ឌូចិនបារាំង, Ĕnduchĕn Bareăng; Lao: ອິນດູຈີນຝຣັ່ງ, Indouchin Frang) officially known as the Indochinese Union (Note: Decree of 17 October 1887.) (Note: French: Union indochinoise; Vietnamese: Liên bang Đông Dương (IPA: [liən ɓaːŋ ɗoŋ zɯɤŋ]), 聯邦東洋, lit. 'East Ocean Federation'; Khmer: សហភាពឥណ្ឌូចិន; Lao: ສະຫະພາບອິນໂດຈີນ) and after 1941 as the Indochinese Federation, (Note: French: Fédération indochinoise) was a group of French-dependent territories in Southeast Asia from 1887 to 1954. It was initially a federation of French colonies (1887–1949), later a confederation of French associated states (1949–1954). It comprised Cambodia, Laos (from 1899), Guangzhouwan of China (1898–1945), and the Vietnamese regions of Tonkin, Annam and Cochinchina. It was established in 1887 and was dissolved in 1954. In 1949, Vietnam was reunited and it regained Cochinchina. Its capitals were Hanoi (1902–1945) and Saigon (1887–1902, 1945–1954).

The Second French Empire colonized Cochinchina in 1862 and established a protectorate in Cambodia in 1863. After the French Third Republic took over northern Vietnam through the Tonkin campaign, the various protectorates were consolidated into one union in 1887. Two more entities were incorporated into the union: the Laotian protectorate and the Chinese territory of Guangzhouwan. The French exploited the resources in the region during their rule, while also contributing to limited and uneven improvements of the health and education system in the region, designed to benefit the French and, to an extent, a tiny group of native elites, rather than most of the local population. Deep divides remained between the native population and the colonists, leading to sporadic rebellions by the former.

After the Fall of France during World War II, the colony was administered by the Vichy government and was under Japanese occupation until 9 March 1945, when the Japanese army overthrew the colonial regime. They established puppet states including the Empire of Vietnam. After the Japanese surrender, the communist Viet Minh movement called for an uprising, leading to the August Revolution. Ho Chi Minh, leader of the Viet Minh, subsequently proclaimed the independence of the Democratic Republic of Vietnam on 2 September 1945. In 1946, the Franco-Chinese and Ho–Sainteny Agreements enabled French forces to replace the Chinese north of the 16th parallel and facilitated a coexistence between the DRV and the French that strengthened the Viet Minh while undermining the Vietnamese nationalists. That summer, the Viet Minh colluded with French forces to eliminate nationalists, targeted for their ardent anti-colonialism, which led to all-out the First Indochina War.

In 1945, France returned Guangzhouwan to China. To counter the Viet Minh and as part of an effort to preserve French colonial influence, France, working with Vietnamese nationalists, formed the anti-communist State of Vietnam as an associated state within the French Union in 1949. This led to Cochinchina returning to Vietnam in June. Laos and Cambodia also became French associated states the same year. French efforts to retake Indochina were unsuccessful, culminating in defeat at the Battle of Điện Biên Phủ. On 22 October and 9 November 1953, Laos and Cambodia gained independence, as did Vietnam (Note: The Matignon Treaty was never ratified by the two heads of state; but according to its Article 4, it came into effect on the day of signing.) with the Geneva Accords of 21 July 1954, ending French Indochina.

== History ==
=== Background ===
==== Early French encounters ====
French–Vietnamese contacts can be traced to 1658 when Jesuit missionaries Joseph Francis Tissanier and Pierre Jacques Albier arrived in Vietnam. Around this time, Vietnam was carrying out its Nam tiến ("Southward"), the occupation of the Mekong Delta, a territory being part of the Khmer Empire and to a lesser extent, the kingdom of Champa which they had defeated in 1471.

European involvement in Vietnam was confined to trade during the 18th century, as the remarkably successful work of the missionaries continued. In 1787, Pierre Pigneau de Behaine, a French Catholic priest, petitioned the French government and organised French military volunteers to aid Nguyễn Ánh in retaking lands his family lost to the Tây Sơn. Pigneau died in Vietnam but his troops fought on until 1802 in the French assistance to Nguyễn Ánh.

=== 19th century ===
==== French conquest of Cochinchina ====
Expansion of French Indochina (violet)

French assault on Vietnamese positions at Da Nang, 15 September 1859.

The French colonial empire was heavily involved in Vietnam in the 19th century; often French intervention was undertaken in order to protect the work of the Paris Foreign Missions Society in the country. For its part, the Nguyễn dynasty increasingly saw Catholic missionaries as a political threat; courtesans, for example, an influential faction in the dynastic system, feared for their status in a society influenced by an insistence on monogamy.

A brief period of unification under the Nguyễn dynasty ended in 1858 with French military intervention. Under the pretext of protesting the persecution and expulsion of Catholic missionaries, and following Charles de Montigny's failure to secure concessions, Napoleon III ordered Admiral Charles Rigault de Genouilly to attack Tourane (present day Da Nang).

Fourteen French gunships, and 3,300 men (including 300 Filipino soldiers provided by the Spanish) attacked the port of Tourane causing significant damage and occupying the city. After fighting the Vietnamese for three months and finding himself unable to progress further inland, de Genouilly sought and received approval of an alternative attack on Saigon.

Sailing to southern Vietnam, de Genouilly captured the poorly defended city of Saigon on 17 February 1859. Once again, however, de Genouilly and his forces were unable to seize territory outside of the defensive perimeter of the city. De Genouilly was criticised for his actions and was replaced by Admiral Page in November 1859 with instructions to obtain a treaty protecting the Catholic faith in Vietnam while refraining from making territorial gains.

Peace negotiations proved unsuccessful and the fighting in Saigon continued. Ultimately in 1861, the French brought additional forces to bear in the Saigon campaign, advanced out of the city and began to capture cities in the Mekong Delta. On 5 June 1862, the Vietnamese conceded and signed the Treaty of Saigon whereby they agreed to legalize the free practice of the Catholic religion; to open trade in the Mekong Delta and at three ports at the mouth of the Red River in northern Vietnam; to cede the provinces of Biên Hòa, Gia Định and Định Tường along with the islands of Poulo Condore to France; and to pay reparations equivalent to one million dollars.

In 1864 the aforementioned three provinces ceded to France were formally constituted as the French colony of Cochinchina. Then in 1867, French Admiral Pierre de la Grandière forced the Vietnamese to surrender three additional provinces, Châu Đốc, Hà Tiên and Vĩnh Long. With these three additions all of southern Vietnam and the Mekong Delta fell under French control.

==== Establishment and early administration ====
In 1863, the Cambodian king Norodom had requested the establishment of a French protectorate over his country. In 1867, Siam (modern Thailand) renounced suzerainty over Cambodia and officially recognised the 1863 French protectorate on Cambodia, in exchange for the control of Battambang and Siem Reap provinces which officially became part of Thailand. (These provinces would be ceded back to Cambodia by a border treaty between France and Siam in 1906).

France obtained control over northern Vietnam following its victory over China in the Sino-French War (1884–85). French Indochina was formed on 17 October 1887 from Annam, Tonkin, Cochinchina (which together form modern Vietnam) and the Kingdom of Cambodia; Laos was added after the Franco-Siamese crisis of 1893.

The federation lasted until 21 July 1954. In the four protectorates, the French formally left the local rulers in power, who were the emperors of Vietnam, kings of Cambodia, and kings of Luang Prabang, but in fact gathered all powers in their hands, the local rulers acting only as figureheads.

Japanese women called Karayuki-san migrated or were trafficked to cities like Hanoi, Haiphong and Saigon in colonial French Indochina in the late 19th century to work as prostitutes and provide sexual services to French soldiers who were occupying Vietnam. Since the French viewed Japanese women as clean, they were highly popular. Images of the Japanese prostitutes in Vietnam were put on French postcards by French photographers. The Japanese government tried to hide the existences of these Japanese prostitutes who went abroad and did not mention them in books on history.

Beginning in the 1880s there was a rise of an explicitly anti-Catholic French administration in French Indochina. The administration would try to reduce Catholic missionary influence in French Indochinese society, as opposed to the earlier decades where missionaries played an important role in both administration and society in French Cochinchina.

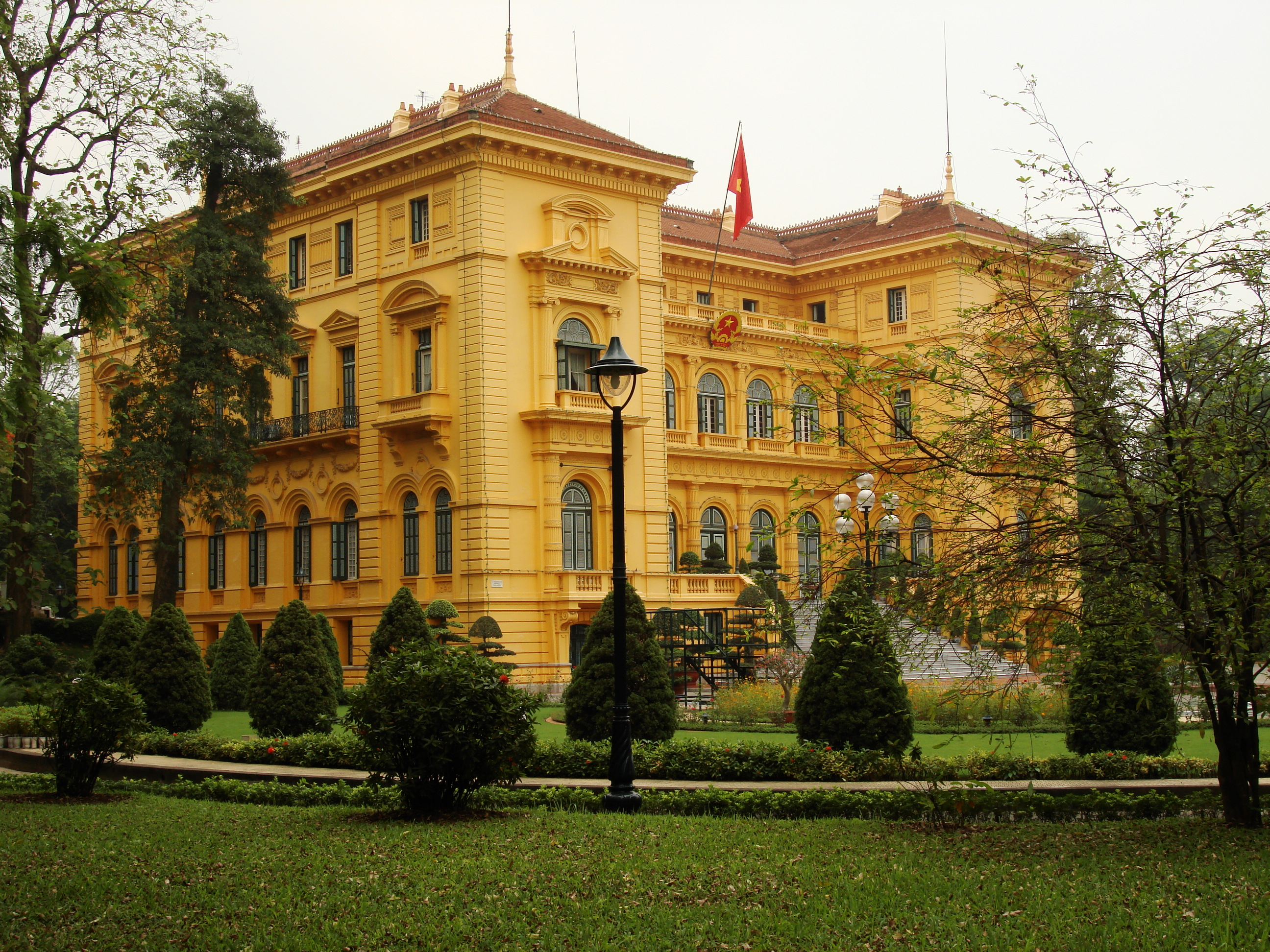
The Presidential Palace, in Hanoi, built between 1900 and 1906 to house the governor-general of Indochina

From 1 January 1898, the French directly took over the right to collect all taxes in the protectorate of Annam and to allocate salaries to the Emperor of the Nguyễn dynasty and its mandarins. In a notice dated 24 August 1898, the Resident-Superior of Annam wrote: "From now on, in the Kingdom of Annam there are no longer two governments, but only one" (meaning that the French government completely took over the administration).

==== Early Vietnamese rebellions ====
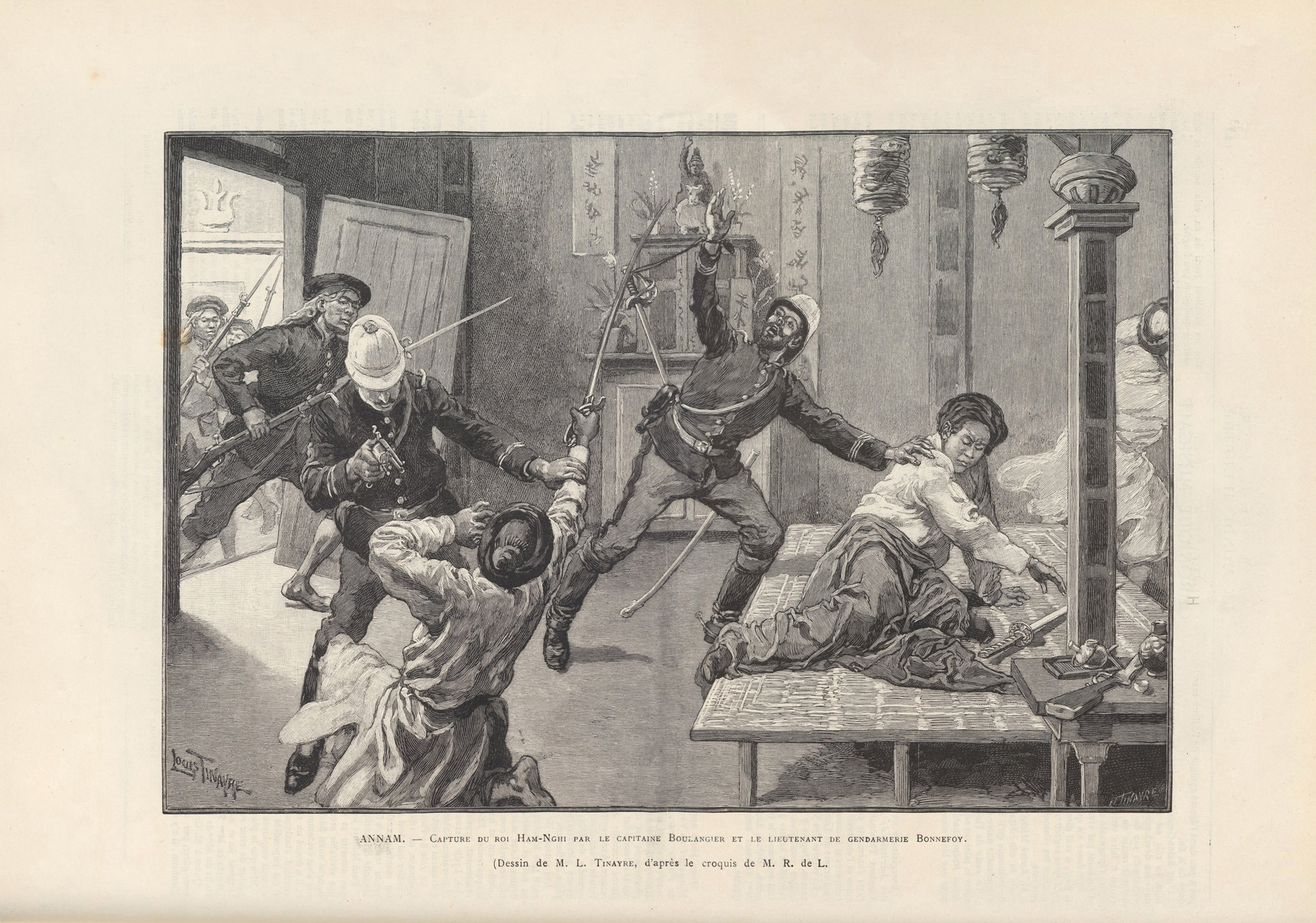
The capture of the deposed Emperor Hàm Nghi, 1888.

While the French were trying to establish control over Cambodia, a large scale Vietnamese insurgency – the Cần Vương movement – started to take shape, aiming to expel the French and install the boy emperor Hàm Nghi as the leader of an independent Vietnam. Between 1885 and 1889, insurgents, led by Phan Đình Phùng, Phan Chu Trinh, Phan Bội Châu, Trần Quý Cáp and Huỳnh Thúc Kháng, targeted Vietnamese Christians as there were very few French soldiers to overcome, which led to a massacre of around 40,000 Christians. Assisted by the lack of unity among the rebels, French military intervention succeeded, with light casualties, in restoring colonial authority.

Nationalist sentiments intensified in Vietnam, especially during and after World War I, but all the uprisings and tentative efforts failed to obtain significant concessions from the French.

==== Franco-Siamese crisis (1893) ====
Territorial conflict in the Indochinese peninsula for the expansion of French Indochina led to the Franco-Siamese crisis of 1893. In 1893 the French authorities in Indochina used border disputes, followed by the Paknam naval incident, to provoke a crisis. French gunboats appeared at Bangkok, and demanded the cession of Lao territories east of the Mekong River..

King Chulalongkorn appealed to the British, but the British minister told the king to settle on whatever terms he could get, and he had no choice but to comply. Britain's only gesture was an agreement with France guaranteeing the integrity of the rest of Siam. In exchange, Siam had to give up its claim to the Thai-speaking Shan region of north-eastern Burma to the British, and cede Laos to France.

=== 20th century ===
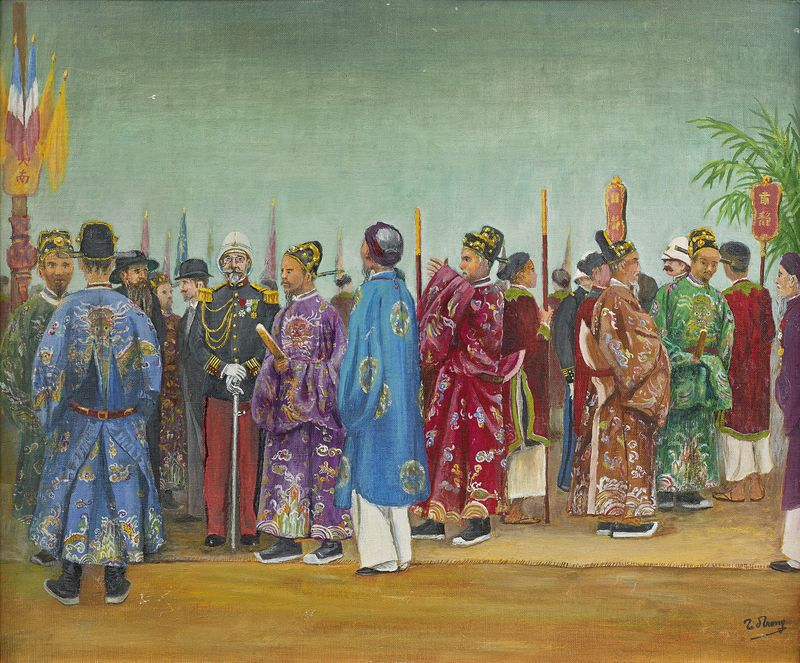
The oil painting Les Mandarins et les Autorites Françaises Attendant L’Arrivee de l’Empereur Thanh Thai, 1903.

==== Further encroachments on Siam (1904–1907) ====
The French continued to pressure Siam, and in 1902 they manufactured another crisis. This time Siam had to concede French control of territory on the west bank of the Mekong opposite Luang Prabang and around Champasak in southern Laos, as well as western Cambodia. France also occupied the western part of Chantaburi.

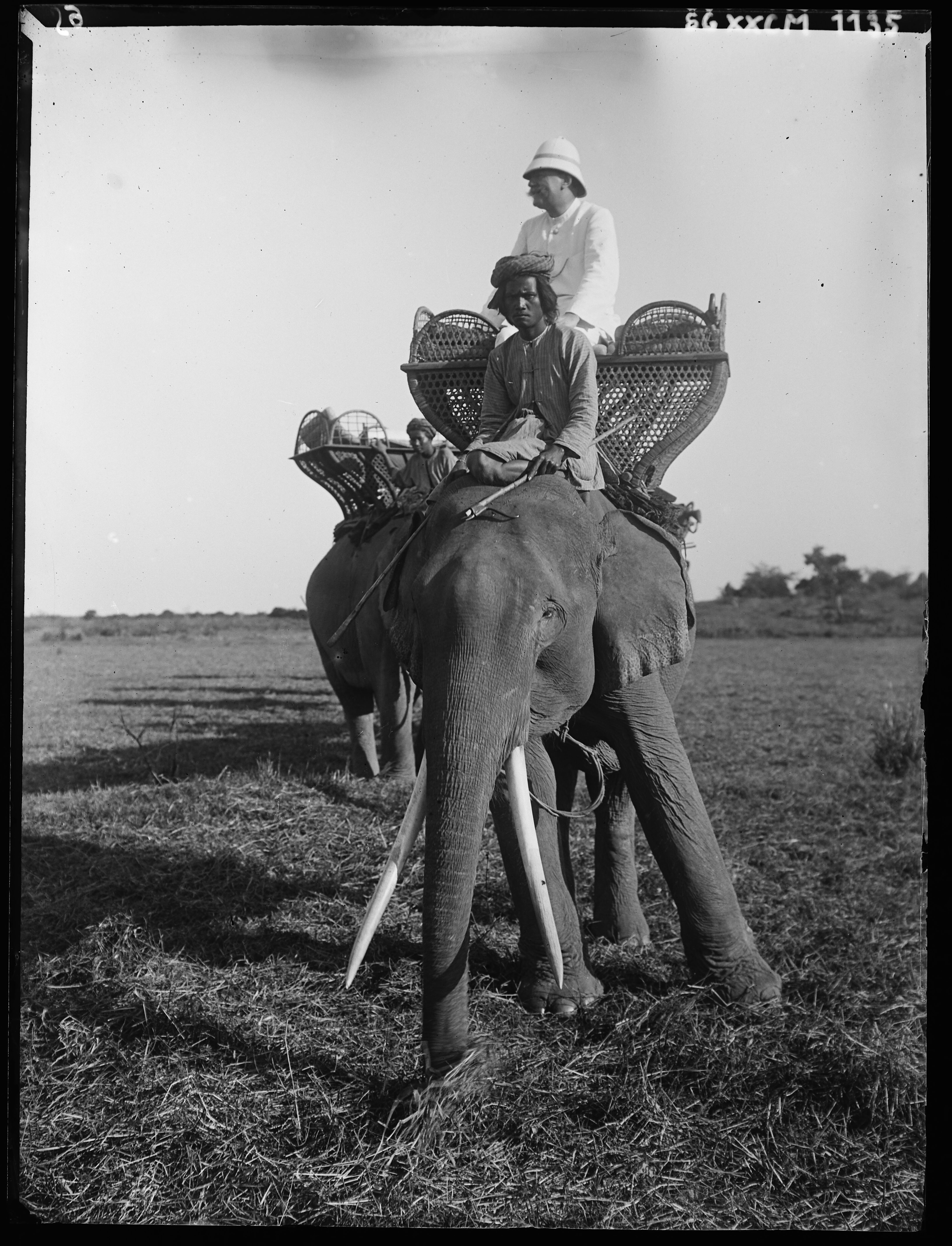
French colonial inspector and local on top of an elephant in Phnom Penh in 1896.

In 1904, to get back Chantaburi, Siam had to give Trat and Koh Kong to French Indochina. Trat became part of Thailand again on 23 March 1907 in exchange for many areas east of the Mekong like Battambang, Siem Reap and Sisophon.

In the 1930s, Siam engaged France in a series of talks concerning the repatriation of Siamese provinces held by the French. In 1938, under the Front Populaire administration in Paris, France had agreed to repatriate Angkor Wat, Angkor Thom, Siem Reap, Siem Pang, and the associated provinces (approximately 13) to Siam. Meanwhile, Siam took over control of those areas, in anticipation of the upcoming treaty. Signatories from each country were subsequently dispatched to Tokyo to sign the treaty repatriating the lost provinces.

==== Anti-French revolts in the early 20th century ====
Opium addiction in Vietnam under French rule, c. 1900.

Although during the early 20th century calm was supposed to reign as the French had "pacified" the region, constant uprisings contesting French rule characterised French Indochina this period. "There is ample evidence of the rural populations' involvement in revolts against authority during the first 50 years of the French colonial presence in Cambodia." The French Sûreté was worried about the Japanese victory during the Russo-Japanese War and its lasting impression on the East as it was considered to be the first victory of "a yellow people over the white", as well as the fall of the Manchu-led Qing dynasty to the Xinhai Revolution which established the Republic of China. These events all had significant influence on nationalist sentiments in the territories of French Indochina.

The early 20th century saw a number of secret societies launch rebellions in Cochinchina, the Peace and Duty Society (Nghia Hoa Doan Hoi) was introduced to the region by the Minh Hương refugees following the Manchu conquest of China and the Vietnamese Heaven and Earth Society (天地會, Thiên Địa Hội). The Peace and Duty Society was also active supporting anti-Qing insurgents in China.

The majority of the traditional literati elites continued to operate under the French protectorate being loyal to their new rulers, but as early period of the Pháp thuộc saw an influx of French enterprises significant changes to the social order of the day inspired new forms of resistance against French rule that differed from the earlier Cần Vương Movement. The new social circumstances in French Indochina were brought about by the establishment of industrial companies by the French such as the Union commerciale indochinoise, the Est Asiatique français shipping company, the Chemin de fer français de l'Indochine et du Yunan railway company, as well as the various coal exploitation companies operating in Tonkin, these modern companies were accompanied by an influx of French tea, coffee, and rubber plantation magnates.

Following the defeat of the Nguyễn loyalist Cần Vương Movement a new generation of anti-French resistance emerged, rather than being rooted in the traditional mandarin elites the new anti-French resistance leaders of the early 20th century were more influenced by international events and revolutions abroad to inspire their resistance and the issue of modernisation. Some Vietnamese revolutionaries like Phan Châu Trinh traveled to the Western World (Đi Tây) to obtain the "keys" to modernity and hope to bring these back to Vietnam. While others like the revolutionary leader Phan Bội Châu made the "Journey to the East" (Đông Du) to the Japanese Empire which they saw as the other role-model of modernisation for Vietnam to follow. The Đông Du school of revoluties was supported by Prince Cường Để, a direct descendant of the Gia Long Emperor. Prince Cường Để hoped that by financing hundreds of young ambitious Vietnamese people to go get educated in Japan that this would contribute to the liberation of his country from French domination.

The Duy Tân Hội was founded in 1904 by Phan Bội Châu and Prince Cường Để. The group in a broader sense was also considered a Modernisation Movement. This new group of people consisted only of a few hundred people, with most of its members being either students or nationalists. Notable members of the society included Gilbert Trần Chánh Chiêu. The members of the Duy Tân Hội would establish a network of commercial enterprises to both gain capital to finance their activities and to hide their true intentions. A number of other anti-French organisations would support the Duy Tân Hội such as the Peace and Duty Society and the Heaven and Earth Society.

The Tonkin Free School (Đông Kinh Nghĩa Thục), which was created in Hanoi in 1907 by the supporters of both Phan Châu Trinh and Phan Bội Châu was closed in the year of its founding by the French authorities because it was perceived as being anti-French. The Tonkin Free School stemmed from the movement of the same name, which aimed to modernise Vietnamese society by abandoning Confucianism and adopting new ideas from both the Western world and Japan. In particular, it promoted the Vietnamese version of the Latin script for writing Vietnamese in place of classical Chinese by publishing educational materials and newspapers using this script, as a new vehicle of instruction. The schools offered free courses to anyone who wanted to learn about the modern spirit. The teachers at the school at 59 Hàng Đàn included Phạm Duy Tốn. in the years prior to World War I the French arrested thousands of people with some being sentenced to death and others being imprisoned at the Poulo Condore jail island (Côn Sơn Island). Because of this Côn Sơn Island would become the best school for political prisoners, nationalists, and communists, as they were gathered together in large, common cells which allowed them to exchange their ideas.

In March 1908, mass demonstrations took place in Annam and Tonkin demanding a reduction of the high taxes.

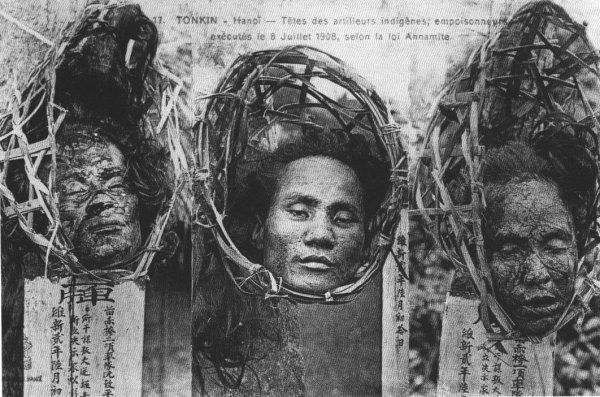
The heads of Duong Be, Tu Binh and Doi Nhan decapitated by the French on 8 July 1908 in the Hanoi Poison Plot

Suppression of the Yên Thế Insurrection, 17 November, 1908.

In June 1908, the Hanoi Poison Plot took place where a group of Tonkinese indigenous tirailleurs attempted to poison the entire French colonial army's garrison in the Citadel of Hanoi. The aim of the plot was to neutralise the French garrison and make way for Commander Đề Thám's rebel army to capture the city of Hanoi. The plot was disclosed, and then was suppressed by the French. In response the French proclaimed martial law. The French accused Phan Châu Trinh and Phan Bội Châu of the plot, Phan Châu Trinh was sent to Poulo Condor, and Phan Bội Châu fled to Japan and thence, in the year 1910, he went to China. In the years 1912 and 1913 Vietnamese nationalists organised attacks in Tonkin and Cochinchina.

Using diplomatic pressure the French persuaded the Japanese to banish the Duy Tân Hội in 1909 from its shores causing them to seek refuge in Qing China, here they would join the ranks of Sun Yat-Sen's Tongmenghui. While places like Guangdong, Guangxi, and Yunnan were earlier in the French sphere of influence in China, these places would now become hosts of anti-French revolutionary activities due to their borders with Tonkin and Laos, being the primary places of operation for both Chinese and Vietnamese revolutionaries. This allowed for members of the Duy Tân Hội to perform border raids on both Tonkin and Laos from their bases in China.

In March 1913 the mystic millenarist cult leader Phan Xích Long organised an independence demonstration in Cholon which was attended by 600 peasants dressed in white robes. Phan Xích Long claimed descent of the deposed Hàm Nghi Emperor and the Ming dynasty's emperor and declared himself to be the "Emperor of the Ming Dynasty".

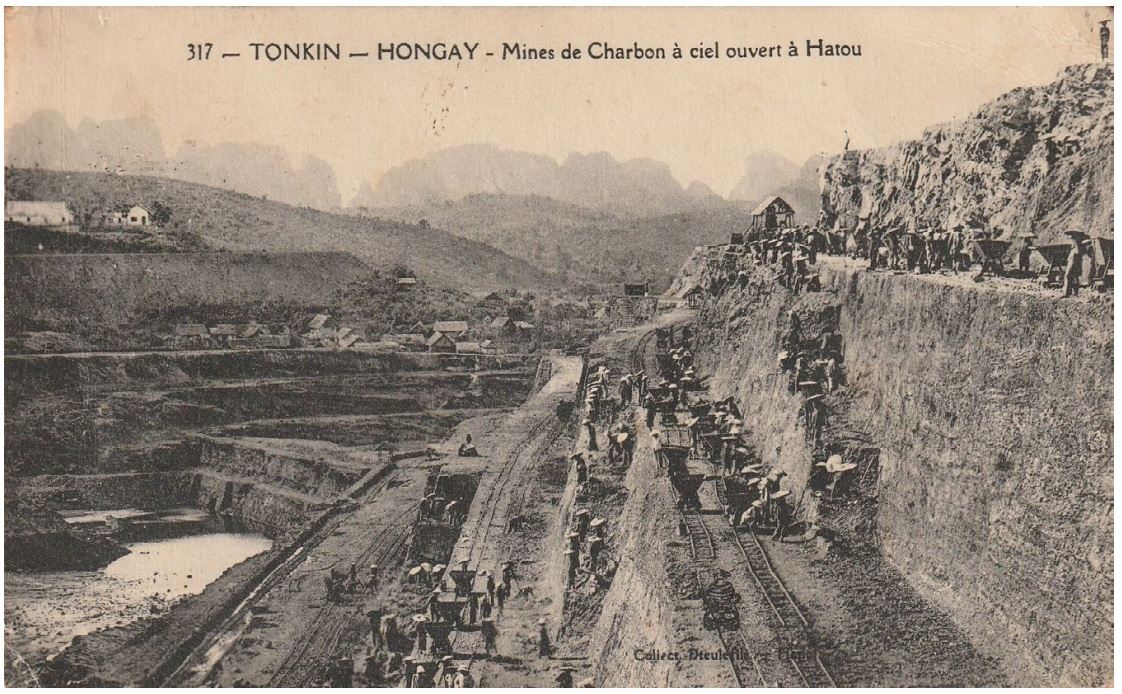
Vietnamese corvee labors in Hongai coal mine, c. 1910

The year 1913 also saw the Duy Tân Hội's second insurrection campaign, this campaign resulted in the society's members murdering two French Hanoi police officers, attacks on both militia and the military, and the execution of a number of Nguyễn dynasty mandarins that were accused of working together with the French government. Another revolt also broke out in Cochinchina in 1913 where prisons and administrative hubs were attacked by crowds of hundreds of peasants using sticks and swords to fight the French, as the French were armed with firearms a large number of protesters ended up dying by gunshot wounds causing the protests to break up ending the revolt.

During the early 20th century the French protectorate over Cambodia was challenged by rebels, just before it saw three separate revolts during the early reign of King Norodom, who had little authority outside Phnom Penh.

During the early 20th century Laos was considered to be the most "docile" territory as it saw relatively few uprisings. The French attributed this to them being more stable rulers than the Siamese who had ruled over them for a century before the establishment of the French protectorate. Both the traditional elite and the Laotian peasantry seemed largely content with French rule during this period. Despite this, sporadic revolts occurred in Laos during the late 19th century and early 20th century. During the late 19th century Southern Laos saw upland minority communities rising up in revolt, these were led by Bac My and Ong Ma on the Bolaven Plateau, who demanded the restoration of the "old order" and led an armed insurrection against the French until as late as 1936. The Holy Man's Rebellion erupted in 1901 and was not suppressed until 1907. It was a "major rebellion by local Lao Theung tribes (the Alak, Nyaheun, and Laven) against French domination". Though there is not extensive literature on these particular revolutionary revolts in the Bolaven Plateau, one can see that the native communities desired to rid the region of the extensive and overpowering influence of their colonisers.

==== Introduction of French education ====
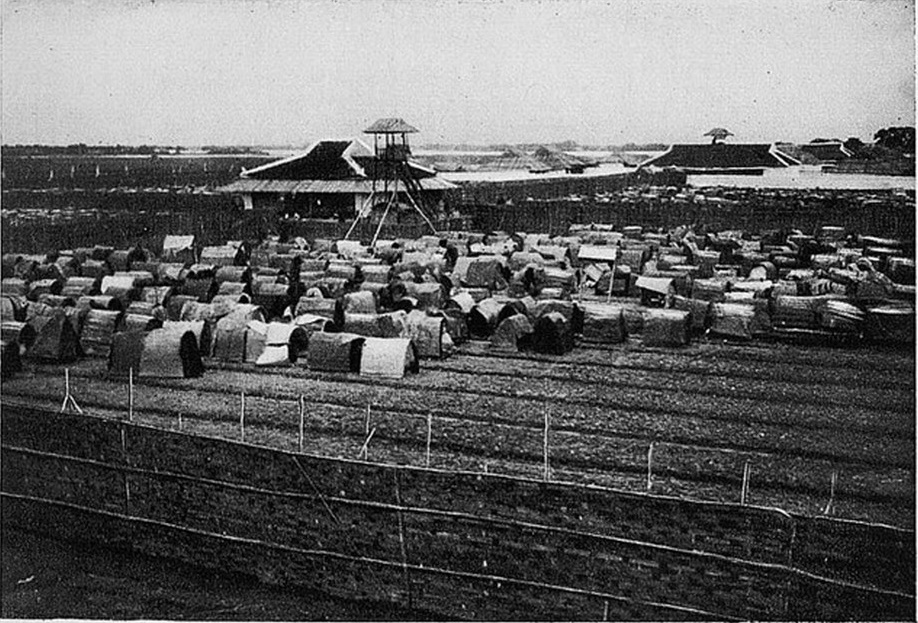
Confucian examination, Nam Định, 1912

Teaching by Lê Văn Miến, 1898–1905

On 16 May 1906 the governor-general of French Indochina Jean Baptiste Paul Beau issued a decree establishing the Councils for the Improvement of Indigenous Education. These organisations would oversee the French policies surrounding the education of the indigenous population of French Indochina to "study educational issues related to each place separately".

According to researcher Nguyễn Đắc Xuân, in 1907, the imperial court of the Nguyễn dynasty sent Cao Xuân Dục and Huỳnh Côn, the Thượng thư of the Hộ Bộ, to French Cochinchina to "hold a conference on education" (bàn nghị học chính) with the French authorities on the future of the Annamese education system. This meeting was also recorded in the work Hoàng Việt Giáp Tý niên biểu written by Nguyễn Bá Trác. The creation of a ministry of education was orchestrated by the French to reform the Nguyễn dynasty's educational system to match French ambitions in the region more. As explained by the Resident-Superior of Annam Ernest Fernand Lévecque "Its creation is to better suit the times as more opportunities to study" opened up in the South to which this new ministry was best suited to help this transition.

While the Nguyễn dynasty's Ministry of Education was nominally a part of the Nguyễn dynasty's administrative apparatus, actual control was in the hands of the French Council for the Improvement of Indigenous Education in Annam, which dictated its policies. All work done by the ministry was according to the plans and the command of the French Director of Education of Annam. The French administration in Annam continuously revised the curriculum to be taught in order to fit the French system.

==== World War I ====
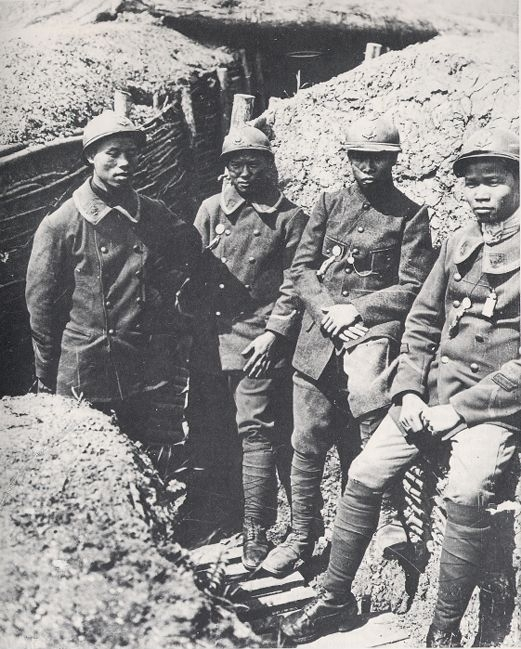
Vietnamese soldiers rest in the trench along the Marne front, 1916.

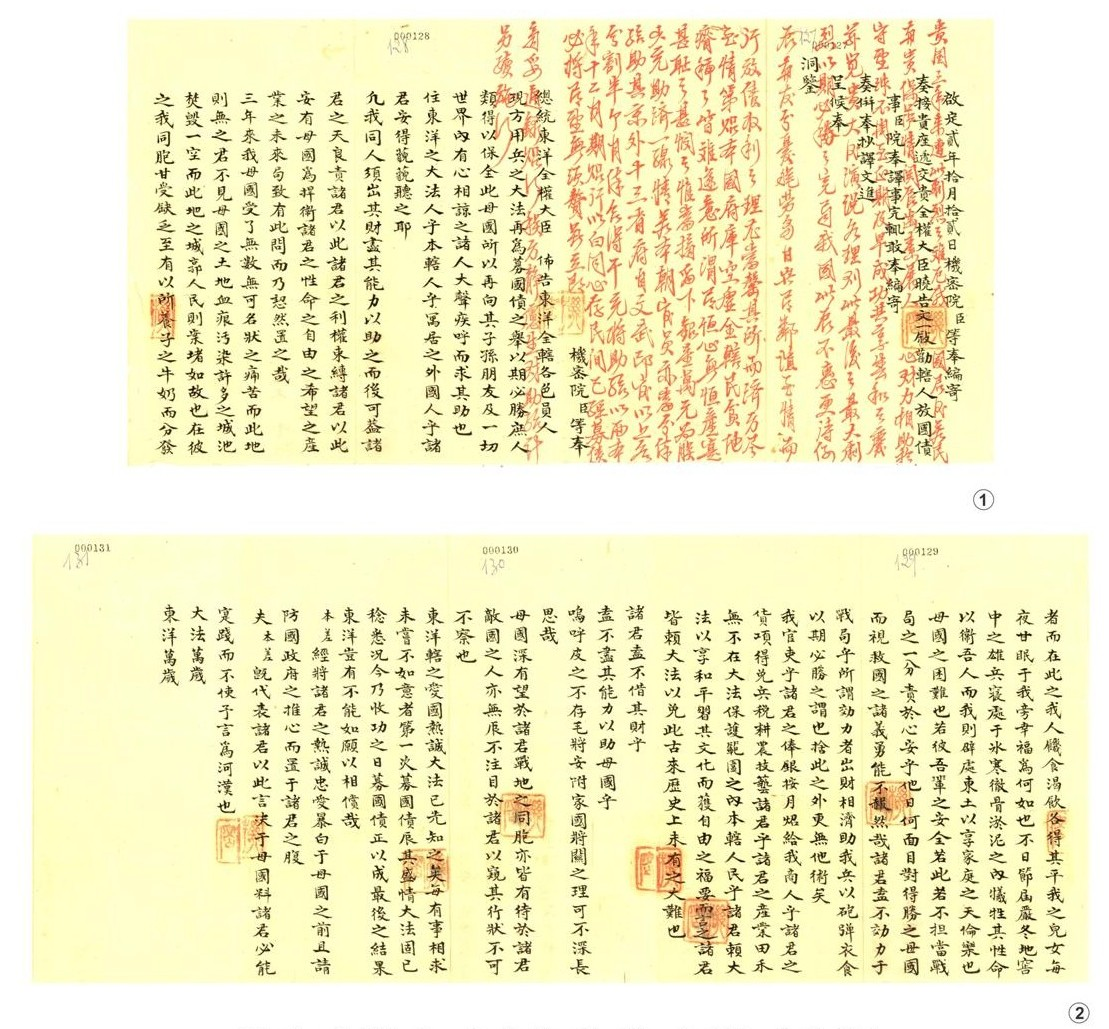
A report by the Viện cơ mật on the financial and military aid given by the Nguyễn dynasty to Great France in the year Khải Định 2 (1917). Note how the document ends with the phrases Đại Pháp vạn tuế, Đông Dương vạn tuế (大法萬歲, 東洋萬歲).

The French entry into World War I saw thousands of volunteers, primarily from the French protectorates of Annam and Tonkin, enlist for service in Europe, around 7/8 of all French Indochinese serving in Europe were Vietnamese conscripts from the two regions. This period also saw a number of uprisings in Tonkin and Cochinchina. French Indochina contributed significantly to the French war effort in terms of funds, products and human resources.

Prior to World War I the population of French Indochina stood at around 16,395,000 in 1913 with 14,165,000 being Vietnamese (Tonkinese, Annamese and Cochinchinese), 1,600,000 Cambodians, and 630,000 Laotians. These 16.4 million subjects were ruled over by only around 18,000 French civilians, militaries, and civil servants.

During this period governor-general of French Indochina Albert Sarraut promised a new policy of association and a "Franco-Annamese Collaboration" (French: Collaboration franco-annamite; Vietnamese: Pháp-Việt Đề huề) for the wartime contribution by the French Indochinese to their colonial masters. However, beside some liberal reforms, the French administration actually increased economic exploitation and ruthless repression of nationalist movements which rapidly resulted in a disappointment of the promises made by Sarraut.

During the early days of the war around 6 million Frenchmen were drafted causing a severe labour shortage in France. In response, the Undersecretary of State for Artillery and Munitions proposed to hire women, European immigrants, and French colonial subjects, these people were later followed with Chinese immigrants. From 1915 onwards, the French war effort's manpower needs started to rise significantly. Initially the French maintained a racial hierarchy where they believed in "martial races" making the early recruitment fall onus primarily on North Africa and French West Africa, but soon the need for additional manpower forced the French to recruit men from the Far East and Madagascar. Almost 100,000 Vietnamese were conscripts and went to Europe to fight and serve on the French battlefront, or work as labourers. Vietnamese troops also served in the Balkans and the Middle Eastern front. This exceptional human mobility offered the French Indochinese, mostly Vietnamese, the unique opportunity of directly access to social life and political debates that were occurring in contemporary France and this resulted in their aspirations to become "masters of their own destiny" to increase. Exposed to new political ideals and returning to a colonial occupation of their own country (by a ruler that many of them had fought and died for), resulted in some sour attitudes. Many of these troops sought out and joined the Vietnamese nationalist movement focused on overthrowing the French.

In 1925, communist and anti-French activist Nguyễn Ái Quốc (later known as Hồ Chí Minh) wrote "taken in chains, confined in a school compound... Most of them will never again see the sun of their country" and a number of historians like Joseph Buttinger and Martin Murray, treated his statement by Nguyễn Ái Quốc as an article of faith and believed that the Vietnamese men who participated in World War I were "forcibly recruited" by means of "terrorism", later historians would claim that the recruitment enterprise employed during this period was only "ostensibly voluntary". While there is some truth to these claims, the vast majority of the men who volunteered for service in Europe were indeed volunteers. Among the motivations of volunteering were both personal and economic ambitions, some French Indochinese volunteers wished to see what the world looked like "beyond the bamboo hedges in their villages" while others preferred the money and the opportunity to see what France actually looks like. Their service would expose them to the brutality of modern warfare and many would change their perception about many social norms and beliefs at home because of their experiences abroad.

Of the 93,000 French Indochinese soldiers and workers who came to Europe, most were from the poorest parts of Annam and Tonkin, which had been badly hit by famine and cholera, a smaller number (1,150) of French Indochinese soldiers and workers came from Cambodia. In Northeast France around 44,000 Vietnamese troops served in direct combat functions at both the Battle of the Vosges and the Battle of Verdun. French Indochinese battalions were also used in various logistics functions such as serving as drivers to transport soldiers to the front lines, stretcher bearers (brancardiers), or road crews. Vietnamese soldiers were also used to "sanitise" battle fields at the end of the war, where they would perform these duties in the middle of the cold European winters without being provided with warm clothes, in order to let the (White) French soldiers return to their homes earlier.

The financial expenses of the 93,000 French Indochinese labourers and soldiers sent to France during the war – salaries, pensions, family allocations, the levy in kind (mostly rice), and even the functioning of the Indochinese hospital – were entirely financed from the budget of French Indochina itself and not from France.

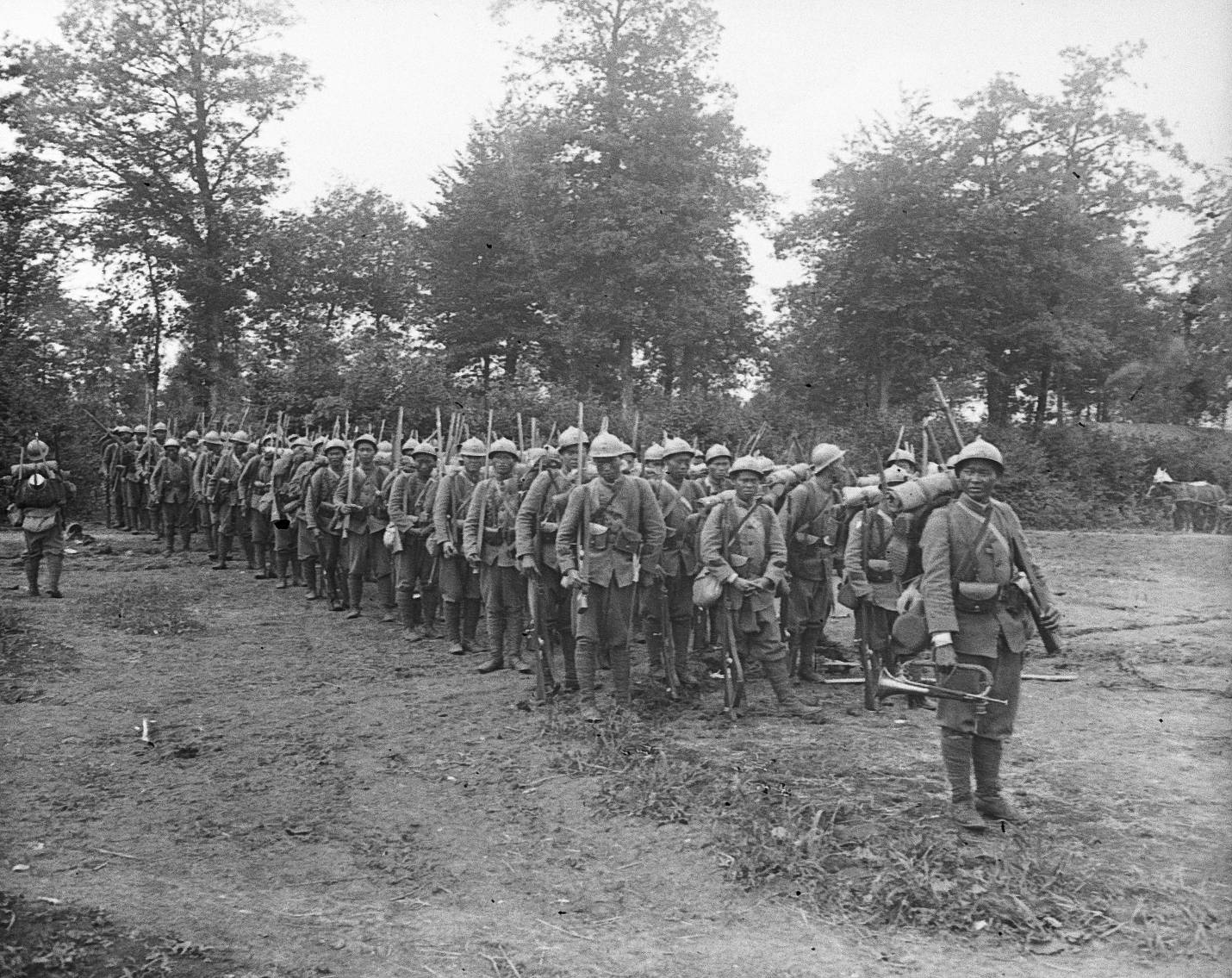
Vietnamese soldiers heading to the Meuse front from Fleury-sur-Aire, 25 June 1916.

One of the effects of World War I on French Indochinese society was the introduction of a vibrant political press both in French and in the indigenous languages that led to the political radicalisation of a new generation of nationalists. Because most of the indigenous people that served in France and the rest of Europe during the War were Vietnamese these social and political developments affected the Vietnamese more. Because French Cochinchina was a direct French colony it enjoyed favourable legislation concerning the press which fostered a public sphere of oppositional political activism. Although these developments occurred throughout French Indochina they were more strongly felt in Cochinchina due to its more open society.

The French Indochinese in Europe experienced much more egalitarian social relations which were strongly contrasted with the racial hierarchy they experienced at home. In France the French Indochinese serving often engaged in comradery with the French and many had romantic relationships with French women, the latter being unthinkable in their home countries.

During this period, the French protectorates of Annam and Tonkin were initially ruled by the Emperor Duy Tân. However, in 1916, the Duy Tân Emperor was accused by the French of calling for his subjects to resist French rule and after his deposition he and his father were exiled to the island of La Réunion in the Indian Ocean. Thereafter, the Khải Định Emperor became the new monarch of Annam and Tonkin and he closely collaborated with the French administration. At the same time Cambodia was ruled by King Sisowath who was crowned in 1904 and cooperated closely with the French administration in his territory. King Sisowath attended the colonial exhibition in Marseille in 1906 and was the King at the time of the retrocession of the provinces of Battambang and Siem Reap to Cambodia by the Siamese in April 1907. During the reign of King Sisowath there was "an inexorable increase in French control" and the French residents gained executive authority to issue royal decrees, appoint officials, and collect taxes. The French protectorate of Laos at the time was ruled by King Sisavang Vong, who was crowned king in 1904. King Sisavang Vong was trained at the Lycée Chasseloup-Laubat in Saigon and at the Colonial School in Paris. In 1914, the French built a new palace in Luang Prabang for him, and a new agreement with the French administration signed in 1917 allowed him only formal signs of royal power with actual power over Laos being in the hands of the French.

The Great War presented a number of opportunities for the indigenous French Indochinese people serving in the West that didn't exist before, notably for some individuals to obtain levels of education that were simply unattainable at home by acquiring more advanced technical and professional skills. For example Dr. Nguyễn Xuân Mai, who in 1910 became one of the first indigenous auxiliaries to graduate the Hanoi medical school, hoped to gain his PhD in France so he enlisted to fight in the war. In 1921 he would acquire his doctorate and he became one of the first Vietnamese doctors to enjoy the same rights as his French colleagues.

While World War I saw a number of new economic sectors develop in French Indochina, namely rubber plantations, mines, and other forms of agriculture, these were all French owned and the local trade to the great export-import houses was in the hands of the Overseas Chinese communities. Only a handful of Vietnamese landlords, moneylenders, and middlemen benefitted from the new economic opportunities that arose during this period as the colonial economy of exportation was designed to enrich the French at the expense of the indigenous population. During this same period the average livelihood of the indigenous peasantry was drastically decreased due to both direct taxation and indirect taxes the French used to finance ambitious public works programmes constructed using the corvée system.

Prior to the year 1914, the mise en valeur (development and improvement) of French Indochina was primarily financed by European French public loans, French private capital, and higher taxes on the local populations. But during the war French Indochina became completely responsible both for financing itself and the people they sent to Europe to fight in the war as investment funds from Metropolitan France completely stopped. This meant that taxation increased, more rice was being exported, and the locals purchased war bonds. French Indochina provided a Metropolitan France with large financial aid; between 1915 and 1920 of the 600,000,000 francs that France received from its colonial empire 367,000,000 francs were sent by French Indochina. Though historian Patrice Morlat places the initial financial contribution of French Indochina at 381,000,000 gold francs (valued at 997,000,000 euros in 2017), roughly 60% of all financial contributions Metropolitan France received from its colonial empire (excluding Algeria). Morlat further noted that French Indochina supplied 340,000 tonnes of raw materials to France during the course of the war, which amounted to 34% of all raw supplies that Metropolitan France received from its colonies. The shipping of these materials was threatened by the presence of German submarines.

Vietnamese peasants under French rule.

World War I also saw the colonial government of Cochinchina authorising the creation of Vietnamese-language newspapers in 1916, this was done to secure popular support for the war effort, the colonial authorities hoped that this would create a loyal indigenous group of politically active people. The Cochinchinese colonial government offered financial support to these loyalist newspapers, but kept close control on the contents written in them to ensure a prevailing pro-French narrative. The editors of these newspapers were often retours de France (people back from France) and were kept under close surveillance as they often had connections to anti-French dissidents and activists. Among these newspapers was La Tribune indigène (The Indigenous Forum) launched in 1917 by the agronomist Bùi Quang Chiêu working together with the lawyer Dương Văn Giáo and journalist Nguyễn Phan Long. Afterwards they created La Tribune indochinoise (The Indochinese Forum) and in 1919 these three men would found the Indochinese Constitutionalist Party in Saigon. Because of these activities the French Surêté regarded their nationalism as dangerous.

The French invoked a supposed "German connection" between the Vietnamese revolutionaries and the German Empire, alleging that Hong Kong, Bangkok, and Beijing were the sight of German agents hoping to help the Vietnamese revolutionaries as they shared the same goal, namely to defeat the French.

World War I also saw a number of rebellions throughout French Indochina, in 1914 3 major uprisings happened throughout Vietnam, followed by a number of revolts in Cochinchina. From 1914 to 1917 members of the Tai Lue people led by Prince Phra Ong Kham (Chao Fa) of Muang Sing organised a long anti-French campaign, Hmong independence movements in Laos also challenged French rule in the country. 1914 also saw bands of Yunnanese revolutionaries invade French Indochina, who crossed the border and started attacking French military posts parading Chinese Republican flags, these rebels were later joined by various Laotian ethnic minorities (Lao, Kha and Black Tai). The joint Yunnanese and Laotian ethnic minority rebels spread misinformation claiming that "Paris has been crushed by the German Army" to make the French seem weaker. The motivations of this revolt are disputed as contemporary French colonial officials attributed it to Chinese opium smugglers, while the Canadian historian Geoffrey C. Gunn thinks that it was a political revolt. In February 1916 in Cochinchina supporters of Phan Xích Long marched on the Saigonese penitentiary where he was held demanding his release, this coincided with other uprisings in the Mekong Delta. The mandarin Trần Cao Văn engaged with he Duy Tân Emperor to try and stage a large rebellion in Annam in 1916, but their conspiracy was discovered and foiled by the French. In 1916 the Kingdom of Cambodia saw a 3 month uprising organised by between 30,000 and 100,000 peasants against both the mandatory corvée and the increased taxes, Australian historian Milton Osborne refers to this uprising as "The 1916 Affair", the circumstances leading up to this large revolt were directly caused by the war. 30 August 1917 saw the beginning of the Thái Nguyên uprising, which lasted until 1918.

The large amount of uprisings and rebellions that occurred during the war would inspire the creation of a political security apparatus that was used to find and arrest political dissidents in the post-war period.

==== Relations with Japan during World War I ====
On 27 August 1914, Japan officially entered the war on the side of the allies (also known as the Entente Powers), Japan invaded and took the German colony of Tsingtao and the rest of the Kiautschou Bay Leased Territory. In November 1914 Japan supplanted the German sphere of influence in southern China with its own political and economic influence, putting it in direct competition with French Indochina. Even though the Japanese openly supported a number of anti-French secessionist movements, such as Prince Cường Để's Duy Tân Hội, the French situation in Europe was bad enough for prime minister Georges Clemenceau to ask the Japanese for their help.

The war situation in Europe was so bad that in 1914, the French considered exchanging French Indochina with Japan for both financial and military support, but this idea was quickly abandoned.

Clemenceau asked the Empire of Japan to aid them with the transportation of the travailleurs et tirailleurs indochinois to Europe and by sending its own forces to help fight in Europe. Clemenceau also wanted Japan to help by intervening in Siberia to fight the Bolshevik forces during the Russian Civil War to prevent the loss of the many French-Russian loans, which were important for the French post-war economy.

In 1918, the idea of selling French Indochina to Japan was raised again and, like the first time that it was proposed, it was abandoned again.

Both during and after the war the economic relations between France and Japan strengthened as Japan became a creditor of France following the latter's financial difficulties which came as a result of the war.

==== Expansion of the security apparatus ====
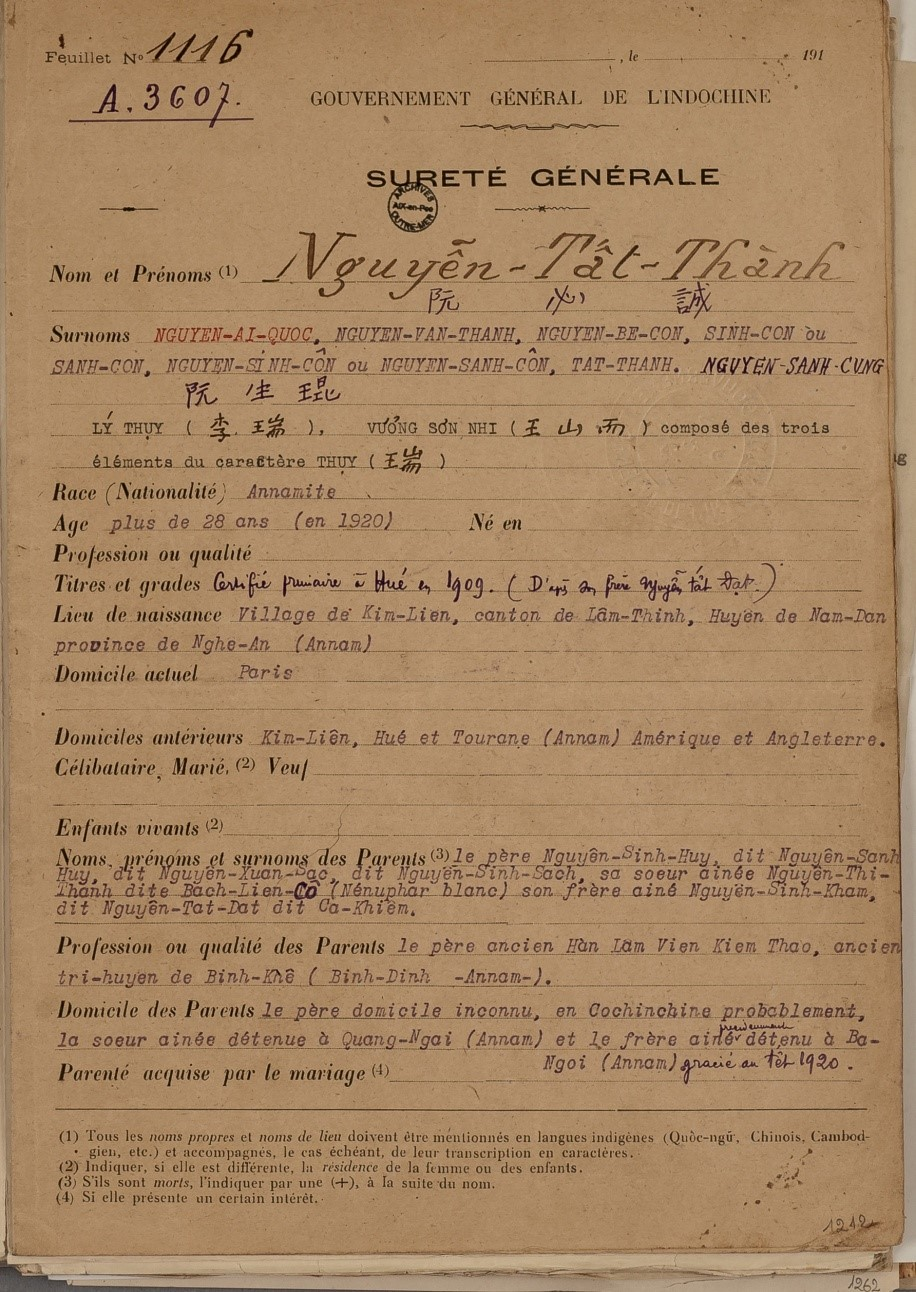
A 1920 report by the Sûreté générale indochinoise on Nguyễn Tất Thành (阮必誠), who would later be known as Hồ Chí Minh (胡志明).

As Sarraut was determined to secure French rule over the country he created a strong political surveillance apparatus that functioned throughout French Indochina. He centralised all local police forces and developed an intelligence service, these policies would lead to the creation of the Sûreté générale indochinoise, which sought to monitor and police anti-French activities both inside and outside of French Indochina.

French security was expanded because of fears of German involvement with their enemies in the Far East, Gaston Ernest Liébert, the French consul in Hong Kong and a major player for the intelligence services coordinated by the political affairs bureau of French Indochina, noted that Vietnamese revolutionaries and Germany both shared the same interest (the defeat of the French). Liébert argued that French Indochinese who rebelled should be treated according or as traitors to France. Another reason for the expansion of the security state was that the French feared that such a large expulsion of French soldiers to fight against the Germans would inspire a general uprising similar to what the British experienced in Egypt.

In April 1916 the administrator of civil services at the Political Affairs Bureau in Hanoi launched two voluminous reports that went into great detail about the parallel histories of what he referred to as the "Annamese Revolutionary Party" (how he called the Duy Tân Hội) and of the secret societies of French Cochinchina. These two reports proved to be very important to the Political Affairs Bureau as they would trigger a full-scale reform of the organisation making it into an umbrella organisation. The reform policies were enacted to help control the narrative around French rule through policing and surveillance. The colonial police forces were connected with "the general control of Indochinese workers and riflemen" (Contrôle général des travailleurs et tirailleurs indochinois), a political police force, as the military presence was reduced to allocate more soldiers to the home front. In Metropolitan France these nascent surveillance organisations were put in charge of policing the 100,000 French Indochinese present to help fight the Central Powers.

Both domestically and internationally, the French Indochinese police maintained a sizeable network of informants, countries where they operated included not only Metropolitan France, but also neighbouring countries like China and Siam as well as Japan, which was a common refuge for Vietnamese nationalists. The French Indochinese police often got foreign authorities to arrest anti-French activists, e.g. Phan Bội Châu who was hiding in China since 1909 was arrested there in 1917. Phan Bội Châu admitted to being in contact with German and Austro-Hungarian ministers, noting that the Germans and Austro-Hungarians promised his revolutionary activities financial support in the form of 10,000 Siamese ticals (approximately 55,000 euros in 2017). Phan would later be arrested abroad again in 1925, when he arrived in Shanghai on what he thought was a short trip on behalf of his movement. He was to meet with Hồ Chí Minh, who at that time used the name Lý Thụy, one of Hồ's many aliases. Hồ had invited Phan to come to Canton to discuss matters of common interest. Hồ was in Canton at the Soviet Embassy, purportedly as a Soviet citizen working as a secretary, translator, and interpreter. In exchange for money, Hồ allegedly informed the French police of Phan's imminent arrival. Phan was arrested by French agents and transported back to Hanoi.

Following the communist victory in the October Revolution the security apparatus of French Indochina was strengthened to fight the "Bolshevik danger" in the colonies. While the Sûreté générale was created during World War I, in 1922 it was expanded to become a better instrument to surveil and repress any potential Bolshevik elements, first in Metropolitan France and later in French Indochina. The activities of the Sûreté générale indochinoise were managed by the newly created Department of Political Affairs. The Sûreté générale indochinoise would be used as the paramount tool to gather intelligence of subversive elements within French Indochinese society and to conduct large-scale union-wide registration by the colonial police forces of suspects and convicts.

The increase in surveillance and repression was accompanied with a propaganda campaign aimed to convince the indigenous populations of the "enlightenment" of French colonialism. Both the indigenous peasantry and the elites had to be won over by being told of the many "advantages of colonialism". The Political Affairs Bureau assembled a number of Vietnamese elites belonging to the indigenous intelligentsia through the French School of the Far East to aid in the pro-French propaganda effort.

While the French hoped to isolate political dissidents by locking them up in prisons, these prisons would ironically turn into "schools" for nationalism and Communism as concentrating a large number of political enemies together would allow them to communicate with each other, which contributed to the growth of Communism within French Indochina.

==== 1920s ====
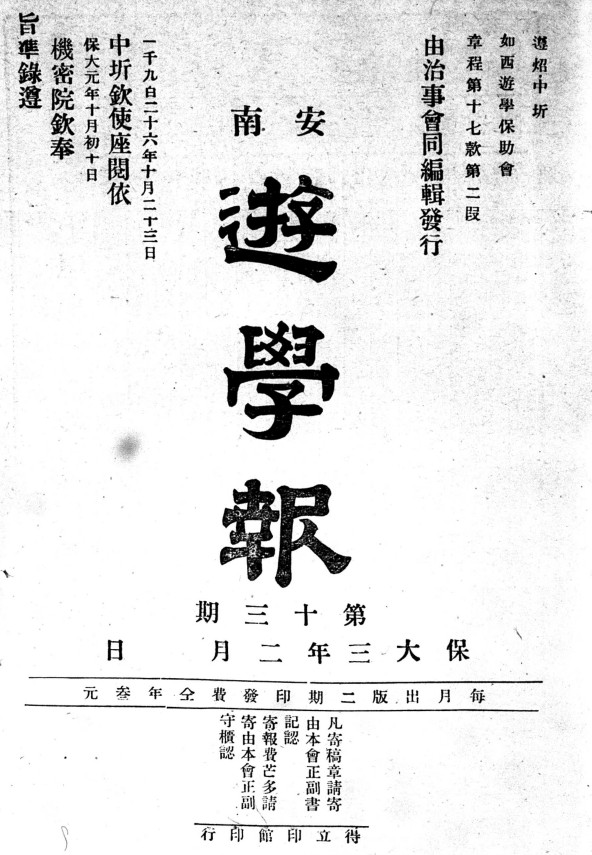
A Bảo Đại 3 (1928) issue of the bimonthly Du-học-báo (遊學報) magazine issued by the Société d'encouragement aux études occidentales (Vietnamese: Annam như Tây du học bảo trợ hội; Hán-Nôm: 安南如西遊學保助會), an organisation set up by the Southern Court to bring Annamese students to France to study the latest scientific literature.

As French Indochina was supposed to be a self-financed colonie d'exploitation économique (colony of economic exploitation) most of its budget during this period was financed through revenue collection, taxes on the local populations, and consumption quotas for monopolised goods such as opium, salt, and alcohol. In 1920 44% of the French Indochinese government budget came from opium, salt, and alcohol alone.

During the 1920s France allowed more Vietnamese to enter Metropolitan France for both studying and work purposes. Both legal and illegal immigrants entered France from French Indochina working various types of jobs, such as sailors, photographers, cooks, restaurant and shop owners and manual labourers. In France many Vietnamese immigrants and their organisations aligned themselves with the French Communist Party (PCF) who promised to represent them both in legal and political matters. As returnees from France were more skilled and spoke fluent French the French colonists in Indochina would hire them to perform better paying jobs and often brought ideas of the successful Bolshevik Revolution in Russia. In provinces like Thanh Hoá, Nghệ An, and Hà Tĩnh where around twenty thousand returnees lived pro-Bolshevik activities would increase during this decade and this region saw the creation of many pro-Bolshevik parties.

A number of Vietnamese men would serve in occupied parts of Weimar era Germany after the war. Seeing how the French treated the German inhabitants of the occupied regions, some Vietnamese soldiers would empathise with the German people. Official reports on the French Occupation of the Rhineland summarised the contents of the letters written by the soldiers during that period this way: "The French oppress the Germans in the same way they have the Annamites [sic]."

After the Great War former governor-general Albert Sarraut became the French minister of the colonies, Sarraut was the architect of the collaboration Franco-annamite which characterised French colonial policy during the interwar period. Regarding the internal security of the French apparatus in the Far East Sarraut stated "I have always estimated that Indochina must be protected against the effects of a revolutionary propaganda that I have never underestimated, by carrying out a double action, one political, the other repressive." indicating that he saw repressing subversive elements as paramount to the continued French domination of the region. His policies benefited collaborators while they were instrumental in repressing dissidents. Sarraut boasted the image of himself as a liberal indigenophile who benefited the indigenous people of French Indochina.

Albert Sarraut presented the collaboration Franco-annamite as a necessity of the French protectorate over their countries, the collaboration Franco-annamite was attractive to the Westernised indigenous elites of French Indochina as it would build a framework of mutually beneficial partnership between France and the Vietnamese before full sovereignty for the latter could be restored. In the colony of Cochinchina a handful of indigenous people were involved in the decision-making processes through political bodies that were established to serve as representative assemblies (Cochinchina's Colonial Council, Saigon Municipal Council, among other local bodies).

In 1920, the French established provincial advisory councils in the Kingdom of Laos. In 1923 this was followed by an indigenous consultative assembly, which served an advisory role. Despite the Laotian indigenous consultative assembly not having any real political power, it served as an organisation that brought people from all over Laos together and contributed to the later formation of a modern Laotian national consciousness where prior they associated themselves more with their region.

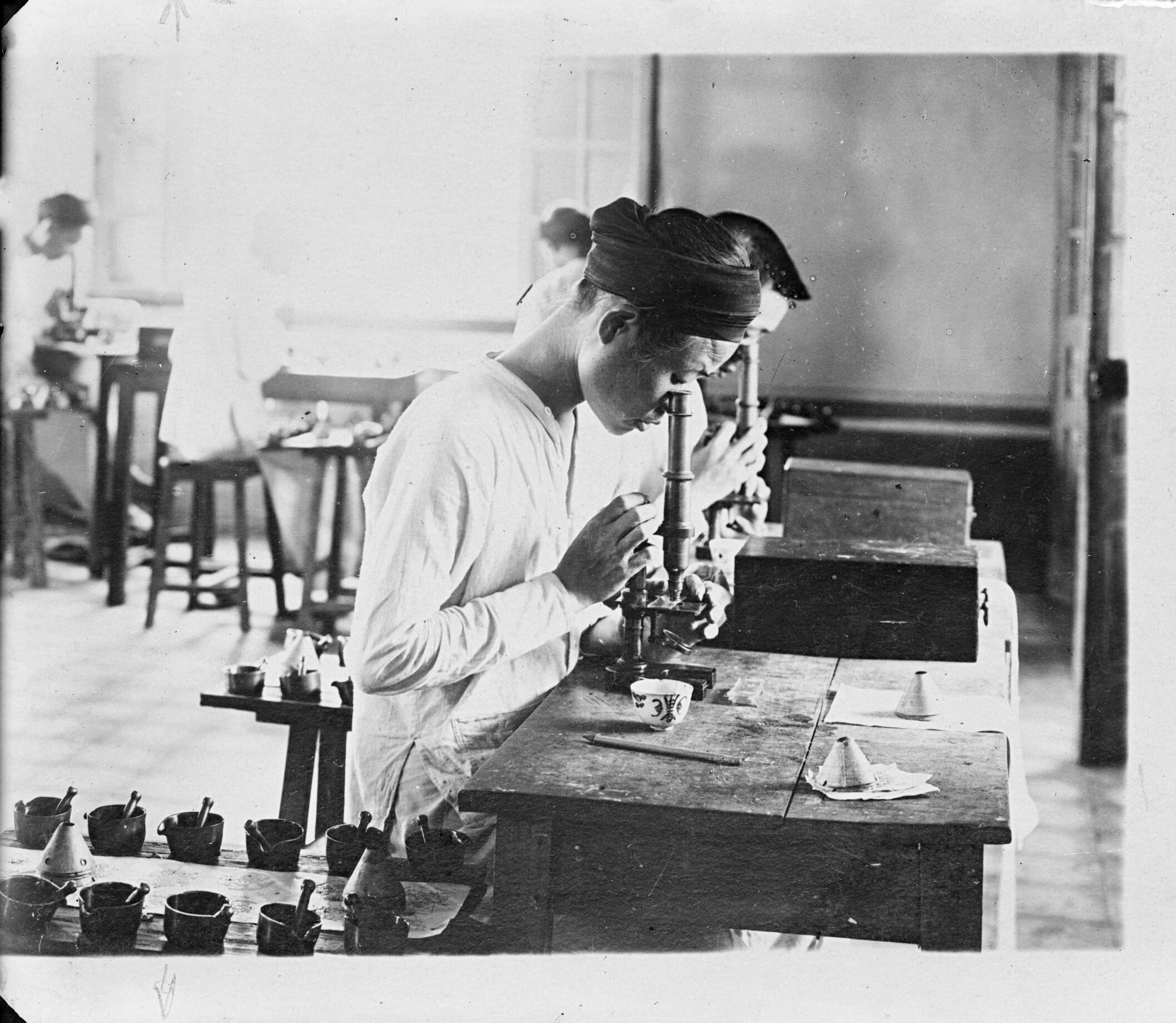
Microscope observation in Indochina

In 1923, Cochinchina saw the creation of the Parti Constitutionnaliste Indochinois led by Bùi Quang Chiêu, which was founded to obtain the right of political participation for the indigenous people in Cochinchina. As a member of this party Nguyễn Phan Long was elected a member of Cochinchina's colonial council.

In Kopong Chang, Cambodia the French resident Félix Bardez was assassinated in the year 1925 by disgruntled indigenous people. Félix Bardez visited the village at a time when its inhabitants were frustrated with the colonial policies of the French in Cambodia as the French raised the taxes to finance the Bokor mountain resort, when Bardez visited he refused to free prisoners who were arrested for being unable to pay their debts, this agitated a crowd of around 700 angry peasants who then killed him, his interpreter, and the militiamen present during his visit. This assassination was a sign of the wider political unrest that characterised Cambodia during this decade.

In March 1925 the French built a war monument resting on two sculpted Asian elephants to commemorate those that died fighting in World War I in the Cambodian capital city of Phnom Penh, the opening ceremony brought together a crowd which contained "people of all races and all religions".

On 6 November 1925 a "Convention" (Quy ước) was established after Khải Định's death that stated that while the sovereign is abroad a council (Hội đồng phụ chính) had the power to run all affairs of the Southern court, with the signing of the convention only regulations related to custom, favours, amnesty, conferring titles, dignitaries, among others are given by the emperor. Everything else is up to the French protectorate government. This document also merges the budget of the Southern court with the budget of the French protectorate of Annam and that all the meetings of the Council of Ministers (Hội đồng thượng thư) must be chaired by the resident-superior of Annam. Thus, in this document, the French colonialists completely took over all the power of the government of the Southern dynasty, even in Trung Kỳ.

In 1927 Vietnamese World War I veterans staged an unsuccessful rebellion in Bắc Ninh province using vintage World War I era weapons and tactics.

According to American historian David G. Marr the 1920s marked the transition of what he termed the "traditional" to the "modern" nation-consciousness among the Vietnamese people, indicating a shift among both the elites and the peasants. Marr argues that the Vietnamese retours de France "urbanised" and "politicised" Vietnamese nationalism during the 1920s and 1930s, inspiring more "modern" movements to take up the struggle against French domination. This decade saw the emergence of the Việt Nam Quốc Dân Đảng (VNQDĐ) and the Indochinese Communist Party (ICP) which were often middle class in nature and proved to be more successful in transcending class and geographical divisions to mobilise against the French than earlier movements, relying on better and more organized communication structures than their predecessors.

During the 1920s the contestation of French colonial power in Cambodia and Laos was mostly aimed at the corvée and tax policies, continuing from the war period. The early years of this decade were characterised by widespread violence and a lack of order and security in rural Cambodia, as recorded by French residents in the provinces. Contemporarily Upper Laos was referred to as being "violently agitated" by the French administrator Paul Le Boulanger between 1914 and 1921. While the nature of Vietnamese resistance changed radically during the 1920s and the 1930s due to various major socio-cultural changes that were occurring at the time by a small, but growing, urbanised Vietnamese middle class, the rebellions in Cambodia and Laos remained to be "traditional" in their style and execution in contrast to the more "modern" political activism and radicalism that characterised what is now Vietnam during this period.

==== Yên Bái mutiny (1930) ====
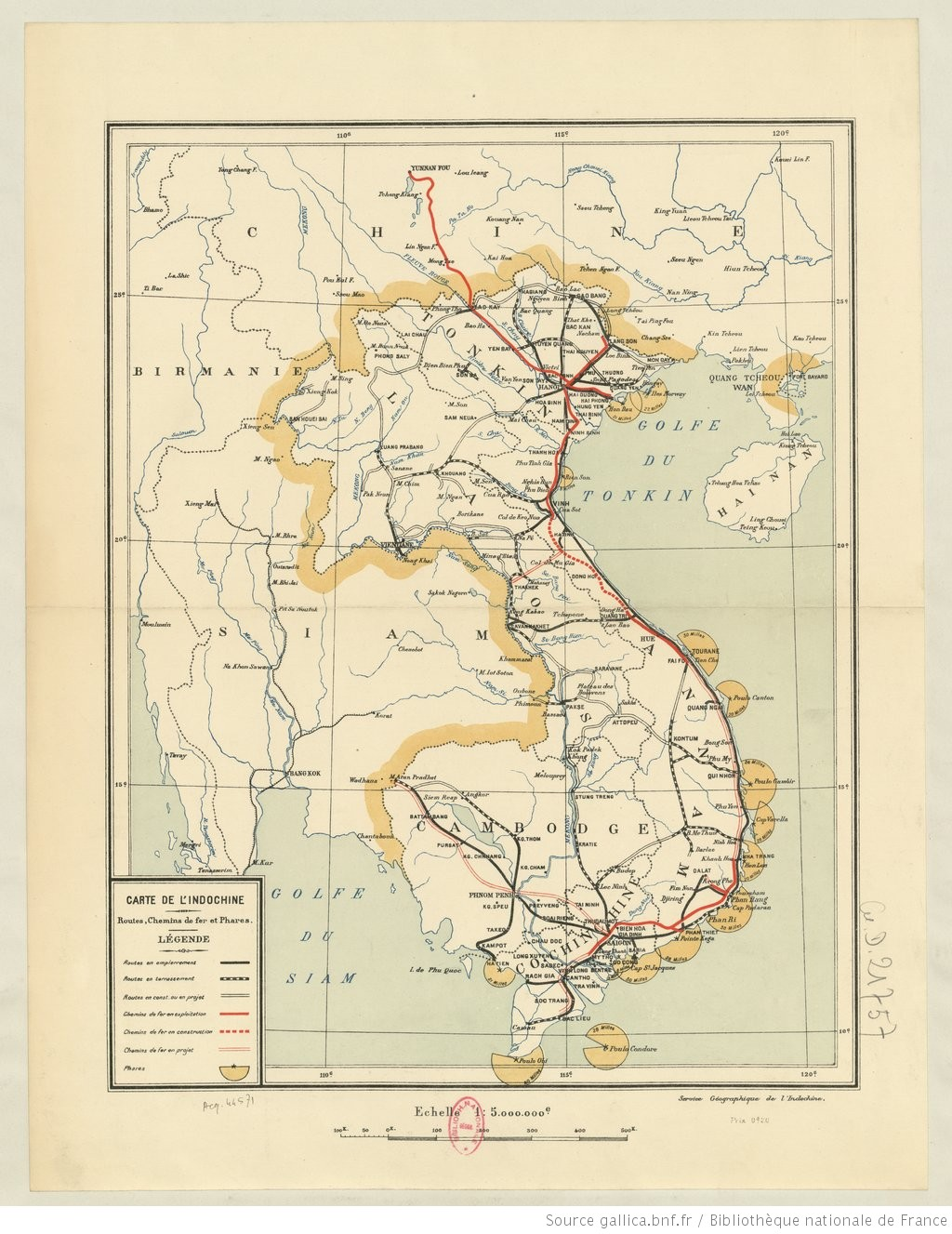
French Indochina around 1933.

On 10 February 1930, there was an uprising by Vietnamese soldiers in the French colonial army's Yên Bái garrison. The Yên Bái mutiny was sponsored by the Việt Nam Quốc Dân Đảng (VNQDĐ). The VNQDĐ was the Vietnamese Nationalist Party. The attack was the largest disturbance brewed up by the Cần Vương monarchist restoration movement of the late 19th century.

The aim of the revolt was to inspire a wider uprising among the general populace in an attempt to overthrow the colonial authority. The VNQDĐ had previously attempted to engage in clandestine activities to undermine French rule, but increasing French scrutiny of their activities led to their leadership group taking the risk of staging a large scale military attack in the Red River Delta in northern Vietnam.

==== Left opposition and the 1940 uprising in Cochinchina ====
In Cochinchina where French rule had the distinction of being direct and therefore more sensitive to political shifts in Paris, it was punctuated by periods of relative liberalisation. The most significant was during the 1936–1938 Popular Front government led by Leon Blum which appointed as governor-general of Indochina Jules Brévié. Liberal-minded, in Cochinchina Brévié tried to defuse an extremely tense political situation by amnestying political prisoners, and by easing restrictions on the press, political parties, and trade unions.

Saigon witnessed growing labour unrest culminating in the summer of 1937 in general dock and transport strikes. In April of that year the Vietnamese Communists and their Trotskyist left opposition ran a common slate for the municipal elections with both their respective leaders Nguyễn Văn Tạo and Tạ Thu Thâu winning seats. The exceptional unity of the left, however, was split by the lengthening shadow of the Moscow Trials and by growing protest over the failure of the Communist-supported Popular Front to deliver constitutional reform. Colonial Minister Marius Moutet, a Socialist commented that he had sought "a wide consultation with all elements of the popular [will]," but with "Trotskyist-Communists intervening in the villages to menace and intimidate the peasant part of the population, taking all authority from the public officials," the necessary "formula" had not been found.

In April 1939 Cochinchina Council elections Tạ Thu Thâu led a "Workers' and Peasants' Slate" into victory over both the "bourgeois" Constitutionalists and the Communists' Democratic Front. Key to their success was popular opposition to the war taxes ("national defence levy") that the Communist Party, in the spirit of Franco-Soviet accord, had felt obliged to support. Brévié set the election results aside and wrote to Colonial Minister Georges Mandel: "the Trotskyists under the leadership of Ta Thu Thau, want to take advantage of a possible war in order to win total liberation." The Stalinists, on the other hand, are "following the position of the Communist Party in France" and "will thus be loyal if war breaks out".

With the Molotov–Ribbentrop Pact of 23 August 1939, the local communists were ordered by Moscow to return to direct confrontation with the French. Under the slogan "Land to the Tillers, Freedom for the workers and independence for Vietnam", in November 1940 the Party in Cochinchina obliged, triggering a widespread insurrection. The revolt did not penetrate Saigon (an attempted uprising in the city was quelled in a day). In the Mekong Delta fighting continued until the end of the year.

==== World War II ====
A French propaganda poster in Hanoi, 1942

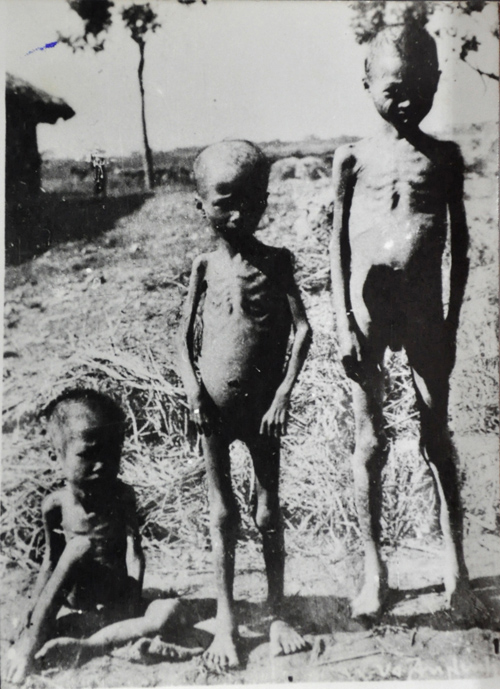
Starving Vietnamese children in Northern Vietnam countryside, March 1945. Photographed by Võ An Ninh

In September 1940, during World War II, the newly created regime of Vichy France granted Japan's demands for military access to Tonkin following the Japanese occupation of French Indochina, which lasted until the end of the Pacific War. This allowed Japan better access to China in the Second Sino-Japanese War against the forces of Chiang Kai-shek, but it was also part of Japan's strategy for dominion over Southeast Asia and later on, the Greater East Asia Co-Prosperity Sphere.

Thailand took this opportunity of weakness to reclaim previously lost territories, resulting in the Franco-Thai War between October 1940 and 9 May 1941. The Thai forces generally did well on the ground, but Thai objectives in the war were limited. In January, Vichy French naval forces decisively defeated Thai naval forces in the Battle of Ko Chang. The war ended in May at the instigation of the Japanese, with the French forced to concede territorial gains for Thailand. The general disorganization of French Indochina, coupled with several natural disasters, caused a dreadful famine in Northern and Central Vietnam. Several hundred thousand people – possibly over one million – are believed to have starved to death in 1944–1945.

On 9 March 1945, with France liberated, Germany in retreat, and the United States ascendant in the Pacific, Japan launched a coup d'etat against the French Indochina colonial administration to prevent a potential uprising by the colonial forces. Vietnam, Cambodia and Laos were established as independent states, members of Japan's Greater East Asia Co-Prosperity Sphere. The Japanese kept power in Indochina until the news of their government's surrender came through in August.

Both Vichy French and Japanese authorities encouraged nationalism in Indochina for their own purposes. Disillusioned Vietnamese nationalists redirected this sentiment toward self-determination. Despite Japanese and French efforts to manipulate identities, profound societal changes occurred in the early 1940s, with Vietnam’s right-wing nationalist groups, particularly the Đại Việt parties, embracing a firm national identity.

The Viet Minh launched a resistance campaign against Japanese occupation. The Viet Minh had begun fighting in 1944, when the French were attacked on Dinh Ca in October 1944 and in Cao Bang and Bac Can French were attacked by Viet Cong in November 1944 and the French and Japanese fought each other on 9 March 1945, so in Tonkin the Viet Cong began disarming French soldiers and attacking the Japanese. In Quang Ngai, Ba To, Yen Bai and Nghia Lo political prisoners escaped Japanese were attacked din Son La by Meo (Hmong) tribesmen and in Hoa Binh and Lang Son by Muong tribesmen. The Viet Minh took control of 6 provinces in Tonkin after 9 March 1945 within 2 weeks. The Viet Minh led a brutal campaign against the Japanese where many died from 9 March 1945 to 19 August 1945.

On 26 September 1945 Ho Chi Minh wrote a letter calling for struggle against the French mentioning they were returning after they sold out the Vietnamese to the Japanese twice in 4 years. The Japanese forced Vietnamese women to become comfort women, as they did with Burmese, Indonesian, Thai, and Filipino women.

In the Vietnamese famine of 1944–1945, one to two million people starved to death in the Red River Delta of northern Vietnam due to various factors. In Phat Diem the Vietnamese farmer Di Ho was one of the few survivors who saw the Japanese steal grain. The North Vietnamese government accused both France and Japan of the famine and said 1–2 million Vietnamese died. Võ An Ninh took photographs of dead and dying Vietnamese during the great famine, which were introduced in some foreign books, say, a Japanese book by Katsumoto Saotome published in 1993. Starving Vietnamese were dying throughout northern Vietnam in 1945 due to the Japanese seizure of their crops by the time the Chinese came to disarm the Japanese and Vietnamese corpses were all throughout the streets of Hanoi and had to be cleaned up by students.

Although the death toll of 1945 famine is generally said to be 1 million to 2 million, the estimated value ranges effectively from 2 hundred thousand to 2 million. Especially 2 million is often cited, which is insisted by the Communist Party of Vietnam, but is not based on academic research since Ho Chi Minh's assertion in the Declaration of Independence of Vietnam on 2 September 1945 has just been repeated. Speaking precisely, Ho Chi Minh mentioned over 2 million in the Declaration but 2 million is the official perspective of Communist Party of Vietnam for decades. On the other hand there are Vietnamese considering other numbers, for instance, the Imperial Commissioner in Hanoi Phan Kế Toại, who later joined Viet Minh, insisted four hundred thousand. Based on his research of the joint field works conducted in the northern Vietnam in early 1990s, of which official report was published in the title Nạn đói năm 1945 ở Việt Nam: Những Chứng tích Lịch sử (edited by Văn Tạo and Furuta Motoo), Japanese professor Furuta Motoo concluded that the death toll would be likely larger than 1 million but seems skeptical of 2 million.

==== Return of the French and early conflicts ====
Vietnamese Christian rally for independence, Hanoi, 2 September 1945.

After the second World War, France petitioned for the nullification of the 1938 Franco-Siamese Treaty and reasserted itself in the region. The Vietnamese themselves were locked in a civil strife over the destiny of their post-colonial state after the ousting of the French and the surrender of Japan. Viet Minh forces seized control from the collapsing Empire of Vietnam, while the Vietnam Nationalist Party and Việt Cách advanced in Tonkin with the support of the Chinese Allied mission, and the Đại Việt Nationalist Party already posed serious competition to the Viet Minh. The South fractured between the Stalinist front Viet Minh and rival groups including the Trotskyists, Hòa Hảo, Cao Đài, and Bình Xuyên.

American President Roosevelt and General Stilwell privately made it adamantly clear that the French were not to reacquire French Indochina after the war was over. He told Secretary of State Cordell Hull the Indochinese were worse off under the French rule of nearly 100 years than they were at the beginning. Roosevelt asked Chiang Kai-shek if he wanted Indochina, to which Chiang Kai-shek replied: "Under no circumstances!" Following World War II, the Allied powers agreed to return Indochina to French administration.

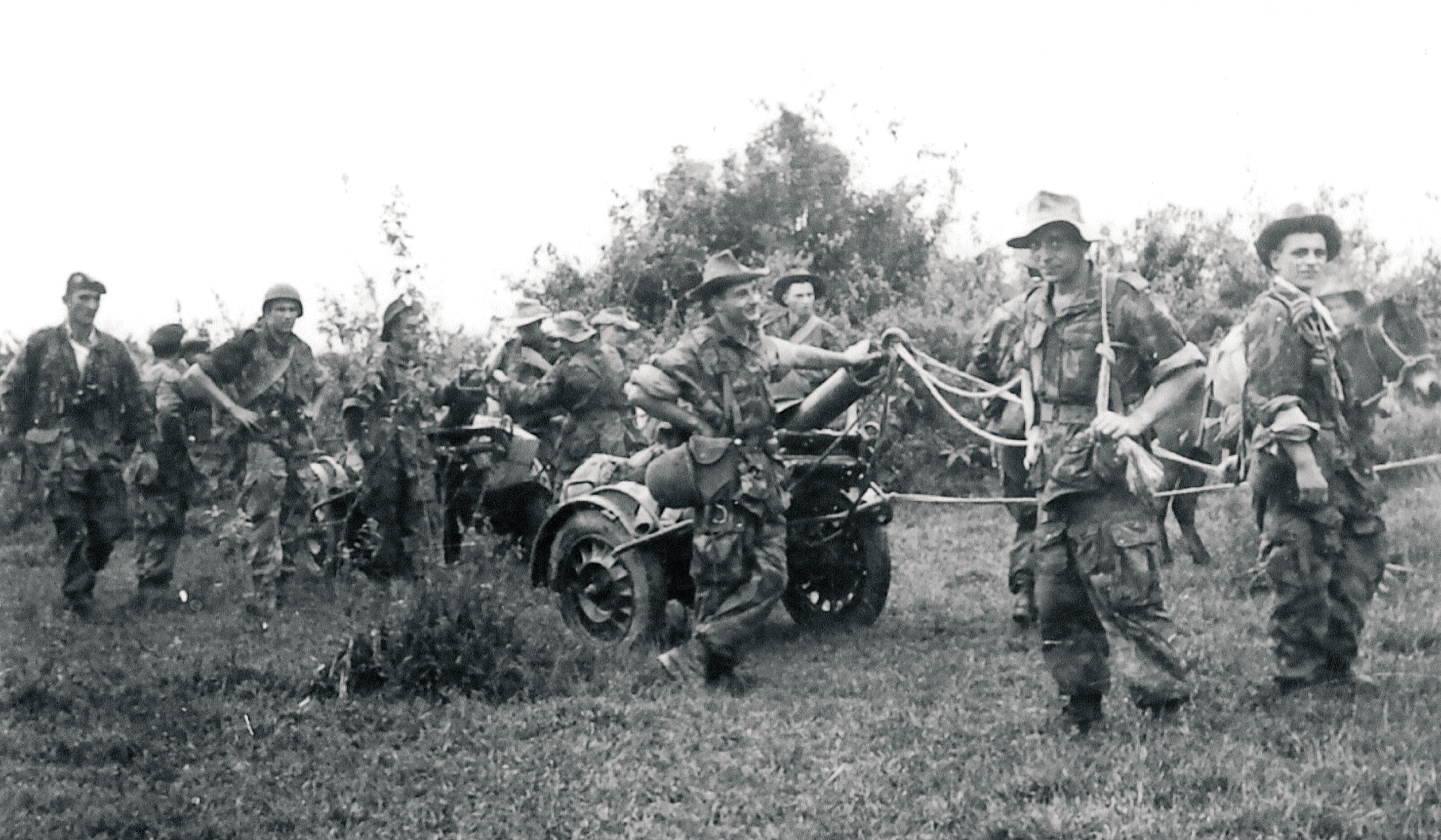
Members of the 1st Foreign Parachute Heavy Mortar Company during the Indochina War

After persuading Emperor Bảo Đại to abdicate in his favour, on 2 September 1945, Ho Chi Minh declared independence for the Democratic Republic of Vietnam. The Viet Minh tried to negotiate with the French in order to gain independence, but the Ho–Sainteny Agreement and Fontainebleau Agreements of 1946 failed to produce a satisfactory, lasting solution.

After the close of hostilities in WWII, 200,000 Chinese troops under General Lu Han sent by Chiang Kai-shek entered French Indochina north of the 16th parallel to accept the surrender of Japanese occupying forces, and remained there until 1946. This was in accordance with the instructions made by General Douglas MacArthur in General Order No. 1, of 2 September 1945. Working with the VNQDĐ (broadly the Vietnamese equivalent of the Chinese Kuomintang), to increase their influence in Indochina and put pressure on their opponents.

Chiang Kai-shek threatened the French with war in response to manoeuvering by the French and Ho Chi Minh against each other, forcing them to come to a peace agreement. In February 1946 he forced the French to surrender all of their concessions in China and renounce their extraterritorial privileges in exchange for withdrawing from northern Indochina and allowing French troops to reoccupy the region starting in March 1946.

General Lu Han's 200,000 Chinese soldiers occupied north Vietnam starting August 1945. 90,000 arrived by October, the 62nd army came on 26 September to Nam Dinh and Haiphong. Lang Son and Cao Bang were occupied by the Guangxi 62nd army corps and the Red River region and Lai Cai were occupied by a column from Yunnan. Vietnamese VNQDD fighters accompanied the Chinese soldiers. Ho Chi Minh ordered his DRV administration to set quotas for rice to give to the Chinese soldiers and rice was sold in Chinese currency in the Red River delta. Lu Han occupied the French governor general's palace after ejecting the French staff under Sainteny. Chinese soldiers occupied French Indochina north of the 16th parallel while the British under the South-East Asia Command of Lord Mountbatten occupied the south. Vietnamese civilians were robbed, raped and killed in Saigon in August 1945.

Chiang Kai-shek deliberately withheld his crack and well trained soldiers from occupying Vietnam since he was going to use them to fight the Communists inside China and instead sent undisciplined warlord troops from Yunnan under Lu Han to occupy French Indochina north of the 16th parallel for the purpose of disarming the Japanese. Ho Chi Minh confiscated gold taels, jewelry and coins in September 1945 during "Gold Week" to give to Chinese forces occupying northern Vietnam. Rice to Cochinchina by the French in October 1945 were divided by Ho Chi Minh, and the northern Vietnamese only received one third while the Chinese soldiers were given two thirds by Ho Chi Minh. For 15 days elections were postponed by Ho Chi Minh in response to a demand by Chinese general Chen Xiuhe on 18 December 1945 so that the Chinese could get the Dong Minh Hoi and VNQDD to prepare. The Chinese left only in April–June 1946. Ho Chi Minh gave golden smoking paraphernalia and a golden opium pipe to the Chinese general Lu Han after gold week and purchased weapons with what was left of the proceeds. Starving Vietnamese were dying throughout northern Vietnam in 1945 due to the Japanese seizure of their crops by the time the Chinese came to disarm the Japanese and Vietnamese corpses were all throughout the streets of Hanoi and had to be cleaned up by students.

While Chiang Kai-shek, Xiao Wen (Hsiao Wen) and the Kuomintang central government of China was disinterested in occupying Vietnam beyond the allotted time period and involving itself in the war between the Việt Minh and the French, the Yunnan warlord Lu Han held the opposite view and wanted to occupy Vietnam to prevent the French returning and establish a Chinese trusteeship of Vietnam under the principles of the Atlantic Charter with the aim of eventually preparing Vietnam for independence and blocking the French from returning. Ho Chi Minh sent a cable on 17 October 1945 to American President Harry S. Truman calling on him, Generalissimo Chiang Kai-shek, Premier Stalin and Premier Attlee to go to the United Nations against France and demand France not be allowed to return to occupy Vietnam, accusing France of having sold out and cheated the Allies by surrendering Indochina to Japan and that France had no right to return. Ho Chi Minh dumped the blame on Dong Minh Hoi and VNDQQ for signing the agreement with France for returning its soldiers to Vietnam after he had to do it himself.

Ho Chi Minh's Việt Minh tried to organize welcome parades for Chinese soldiers in northern Vietnam and covered for instances of bad behavior by warlord soldiers, trying to reassure Vietnamese that the warlord troops of Lu Han were only there temporarily and that China supported Vietnam's independence. Việt Minh newspapers said that the same ancestors (huyết thống) and culture were shared by Vietnamese and Chinese and that the Chinese heroically fought Japan and changed in the 1911 revolution and was attacked by western imperialists so it was "not the same as feudal China". Ho Chi Minh forbade his soldiers like Trần Huy Liệu in Phú Thọ from attacking Chinese soldiers and Ho Chi Minh even surrendered Vietnamese who attacked Chinese soldiers to be executed as punishment in the Ro-Nha incident in Kiến An district on 6 March 1946 after Hồ Đức Thành and Đào Văn Biểu, special commissioners sent from Hanoi by Ho's DRV examined the case. Ho Chi Minh appeased and granted numerous concessions to the Chinese soldiers to avoid the possibility of them clashing with the Việt Minh, with him ordering Vietnamese not to carry out anything against Chinese soldiers and pledging his life on his promise, hoping the Chinese would disarm the Japanese soldiers and finish their mission as fast as possible.

Chinese communist guerilla leader Chu Chia-pi came into northern Vietnam multiple times in 1945 and 1948 and helped the Việt Minh fight against the French from Yunnan. Other Chinese Communists also did the same.

==== First Indochina War ====
Bitter fighting ensued in the First Indochina War as Ho and his government took to the forests and mountains. In 1948, France recognized independence of Vietnam with the Hạ Long Bay Preliminary Agreement. In 1949, in order to provide a political alternative to Ho Chi Minh, the French favoured the creation of a unified State of Vietnam, and former Emperor Bảo Đại was put back in power. Vietnam, Laos and Cambodia became associated states of the French Union and were granted more autonomy.

The first few years of the war involved a low-level rural insurgency against the French. In 1949 the conflict turned into a conventional war between two armies equipped with modern weapons supplied by the United States, China and the Soviet Union. French Union forces included colonial troops from their colonial empire – Moroccan, Algerian, and Tunisian Arabs/Berbers; Laotian, Cambodian and Vietnamese ethnic minorities; Black Africans – and French professional troops, European volunteers, and units of the Foreign Legion. The use of metropolitan recruits was forbidden by the government to prevent the war from becoming even more unpopular at home. It was called the "dirty war" (la sale guerre) by leftists in France. Vietnamese women were also raped in north Vietnam by the French like in Bảo Hà, Bảo Yên District, Lào Cai province and Phu Lu, which caused 400 Vietnamese who were trained by the French to defect on 20 June 1948. Buddhist statues were looted and Vietnamese were robbed, raped and tortured by the French after the French crushed the Việt Minh in northern Vietnam in 1947–1948 forcing the Việt Minh to flee into Yunnan, China for sanctuary and aid from the Chinese Communists. A French reporter was told by Vietnamese village notables "We know what war always is, We understand your soldiers taking our animals, our jewelry, our Buddhas; it is normal. We are resigned to their raping our wives and our daughters; war has always been like that. But we object to being treated in the same way, not only our sons, but ourselves, old men and dignitaries that we are."

The strategy of pushing the Việt Minh into attacking well-defended bases in remote parts of the country at the end of their logistical trails was validated at the Battle of Nà Sản even though the base was relatively weak because of a lack of concrete and steel. French efforts were made more difficult due to the limited usefulness of armoured tanks in a forested and mountainous environment, lack of strong air forces for air cover and carpet bombing, and use of foreign recruits from other French colonies (mainly from Algeria, Morocco and even Vietnam). Võ Nguyên Giáp, however, used efficient and novel tactics of direct fire artillery, convoy ambushes and massed anti-aircraft guns to impede land and air supply deliveries together with a strategy based on recruiting a sizable regular army facilitated by wide popular support, a guerrilla warfare doctrine and instruction developed in China, and the use of simple and reliable war material provided by the Soviet Union.

However, 1950 was the turning point of the war. Ho's government was recognised by the fellow Communist governments of China and the Soviet Union, and Mao's government subsequently gave a fallback position to Ho's forces, as well as abundant supplies of weapons. In October 1950, the French army suffered its first major defeat with the Battle of Route Coloniale 4. Subsequent efforts by the French military managed to improve their situation only in the short term. Bảo Đại's State of Vietnam proved a weak and unstable government, and Norodom Sihanouk's Cambodia proclaimed its independence in November 1953. Laos became independent in October 1953 and the State of Vietnam became independent on 4 June 1954 (although they were still members of the French Union). Fighting lasted until May 1954, when the Việt Minh won the decisive victory against French forces at the gruelling Battle of Dien Bien Phu.

==== Geneva Agreements ====
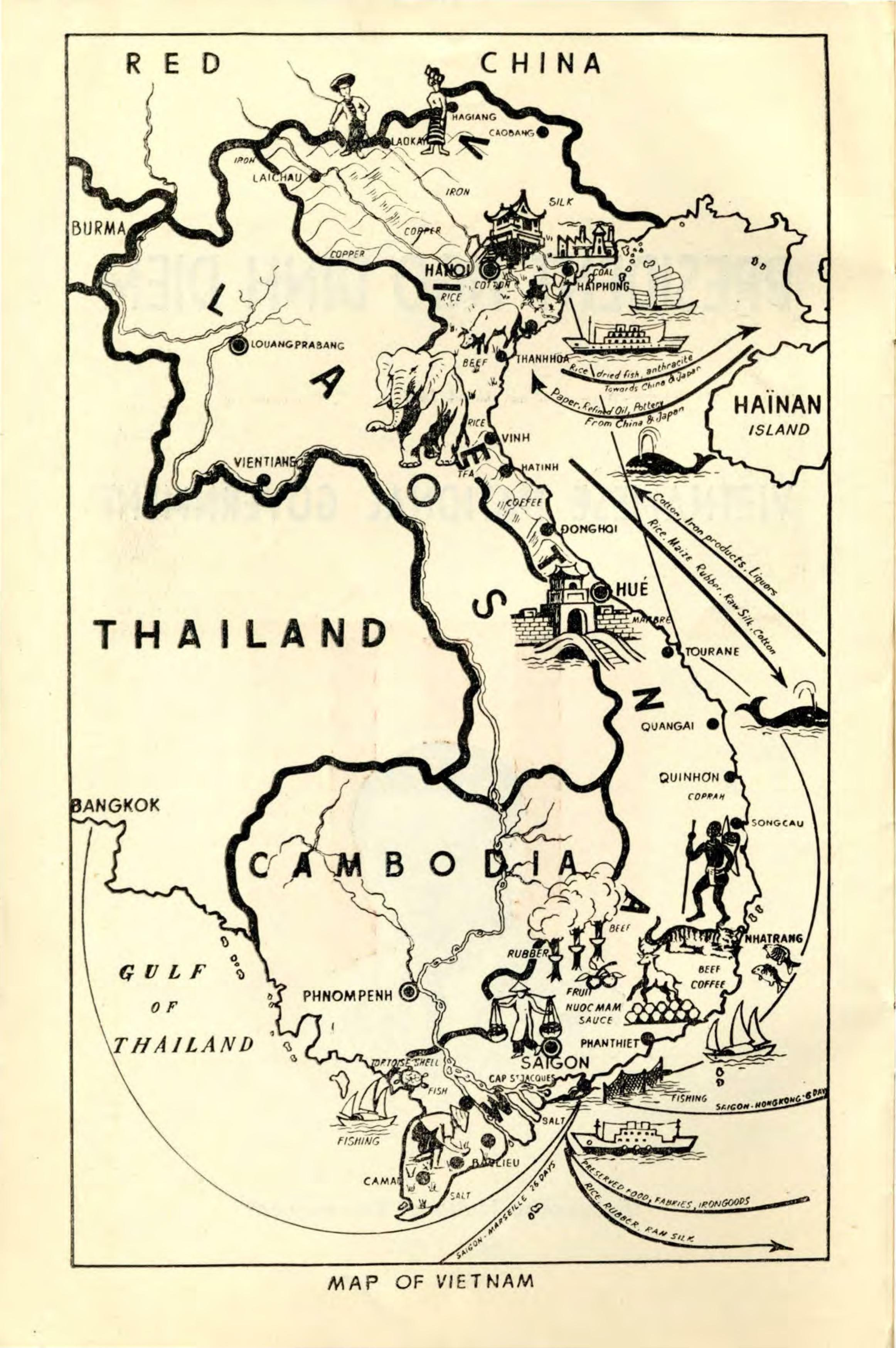
Indochina in 1955

On 21 July 1954, the Geneva Conference produced the Geneva Agreements between the Democratic Republic of Vietnam and France. Provisions included supporting the territorial integrity and sovereignty of Indochina, reaffirming its independence from France, declaring the cessation of hostilities and foreign involvement in internal Indochina affairs, and delineating northern and southern zones into which opposing troops were to withdraw. The Agreements mandated unification on the basis of internationally supervised free elections to be held in July 1956.

At this conference France recognized the independence of the Democratic Republic of Vietnam led by the communist Viet Minh, leading to the division of Vietnam into two de facto countries. The United States and the State of Vietnam rejected the Geneva Accords and never signed. State of Vietnam's Prime Minister Diệm rejected the idea of nationwide election as proposed in the agreement, saying that a free election was impossible in the communist North and that his government was not bound by the Geneva Accords. France did withdraw, turning the north over to the Communists while the State of Vietnam, with American support, kept control of the South. Diệm would overthrow Bảo Đại and established a republic led by him in 1955.

The events of 1954 marked the partition of Vietnam and the ensuing Vietnam War between communists and anti-communists. The Kingdoms of Laos and Cambodia were nominally neutral, but both were drawn into the Second Indochina War after North Vietnamese invasion of Laos.

The remnants of the Indochinese Federation were abolished on 30 December 1954. The Geneva Agreement did not state that the French Union had to withdraw its troops from South Vietnam. However, Diệm's government and the US asked the French Union to withdraw its troops. The French withdrew on 28 April 1956. And on 9 December 1955, South Vietnam withdrew from the French Union.

===== United States involvement =====
In 1954 the French defeat at Điện Biên Phủ renewed the United States interest in intervening, including some senators who called out for large scale bombing campaigns, potentially even nuclear weapons. President Dwight Eisenhower, even though he did not believe a military victory, believed in the domino theory, where if Vietnam were to fall to communism then there would be multiple other countries that would fall to the ideology in Southeast Asia, from Vietnam to India there would be a dramatic shift in global power. Eisenhower chose to not put boots on the ground, but his decision to start to get involved likely is more important to the countries eventual step into the country than Johnson's decision to take that last step.

Eisenhower had a further impact in that he would continue to provide support for future presidents policy in the country, Lyndon B. Johnson and Gerald Ford both used him to large extents, Kennedy did have several meetings with him in the White House, and Nixon was mostly on his own, but considering their familial ties there was inevitably some ideas that were considered that otherwise would not have been. As he was so involved the United States policy in French Indochina his influence is hard to underestimate.

== Administration ==
Government-General of French Indochina
- Gouvernement général de l'Indochine française
- The emblem and seal of the Government-General.

Overview
- Established: 17 October 1887
- Dissolved: 21 July 1954
- State: French Indochina
- Leader: Governor-General of French Indochina
- Appointed by: President of France and the Ministry of the Colonies
- Main organ: Cabinet of the Government-General
- Headquarters: Norodom Palace, Saigon (1887–1902), Residence of the Governor-General of French Indochina, Hanoi (1902–1945)

The government of French Indochina was headed by a governor-general and a number of French residents. The governor-general was assisted by a system of different government agencies; however, these agencies functioned only to be consultants to help the governor-general perform his role and exercise his powers. The protectorates of Cambodia, Annam, Tonkin, and Laos all had residents-superior while the colony of Cochinchina had a governor. In the protectorates the indigenous administrations were nominally combined with the French administration, but in the colony of Cochinchina as well as "colonial cities", such as Đà Nẵng in Annam, the French maintained direct rule. All constituent countries of French Indochina had their own legal systems. In Annam and Tonkin the laws of the Nguyễn dynasty, such as Sắc (敕, "Imperial Order"), Chí (誌, "Ordinance"), and Dụ (諭, "Decree"), remained in effect but were subordinate to the laws of the French administration.

The government-general of French Indochina and its powers were established and amended through presidential decrees. The governor-general held supreme power in French Indochina over the legislative, executive, and judicial branches of the government and had the power to appoint the residents below him. The governor-general was also in charge of all the military affairs of the country, among their responsibilities were the ability to set up an army corps, deploy the French Indochinese military forces, and issue conscription orders. However, the governor-general was not in charge of actually commanding the military forces during actual military campaigns and battles. The governor-general was also the chairman of the Indochinese Supreme Council (later renamed to the Indochinese Government Council) which was the highest government agency in charge of general affairs.

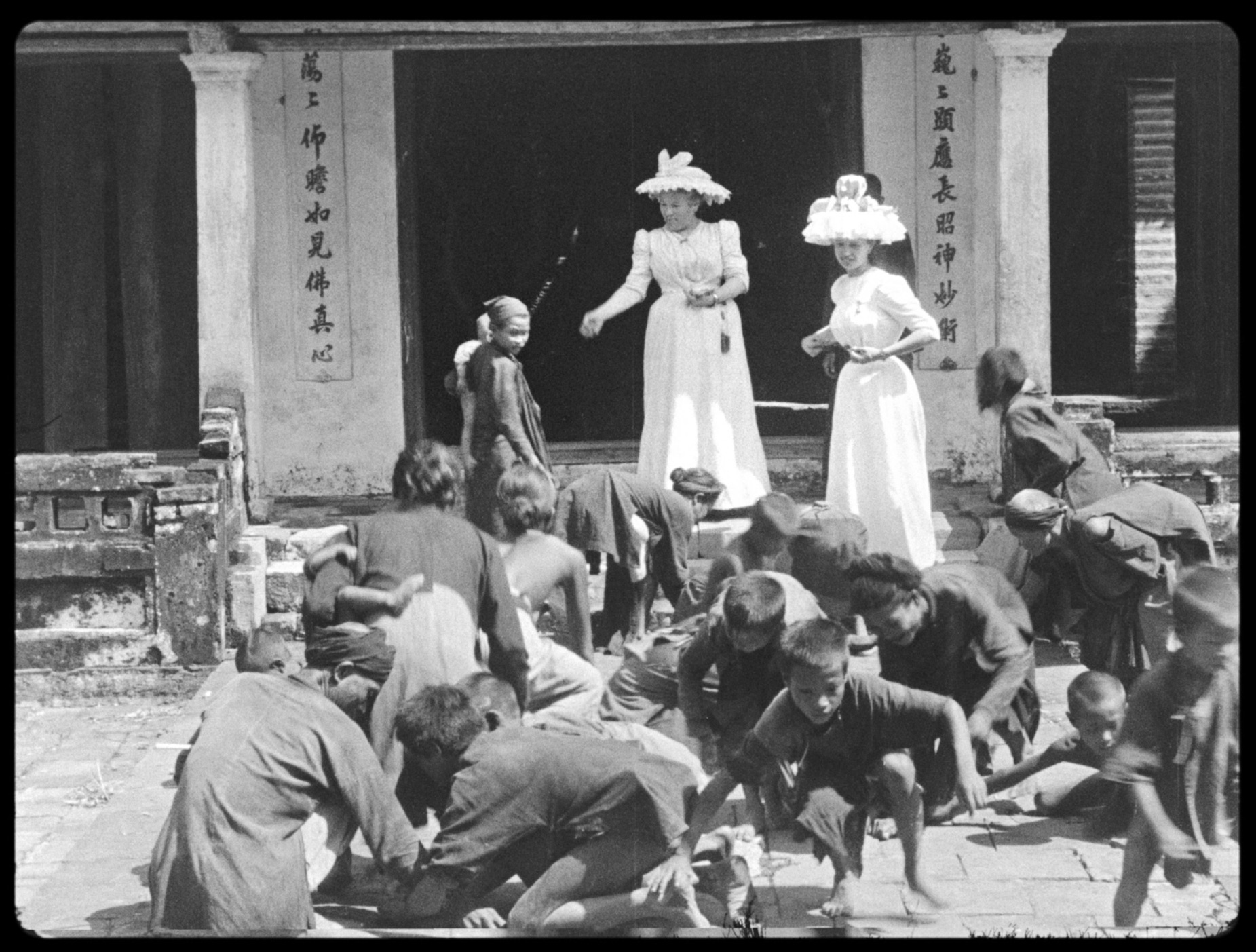
Two French women (wife and daughter of Governor-General Paul Doumer) throwing small cash coins in front of children.

Other government agencies of the Government-General of French Indochina include the Indochinese Defense Council, Mine Consultancy Committee, the Indochinese Education Consultancy Council, the Supreme Council for Exploitation of Colonies, the Indochinese Economic and Financial Interests Assembly, etc.

In the protectorates of Annam and Tonkin the government of the Nguyễn dynasty shared its power with the French administration de jure but were de facto directly ruled by the French colonial apparatus. The residents-superior and governor of Cochinchina did not have legislative powers only executive. While the Emperors of the Nguyễn dynasty did maintain their legislative powers, all imperial decrees had to be approved by either the Resident-Superior of Annam or by the governor-general of French Indochina. Until the early 20th century the Gia Long era Hoàng Việt luật lệ (皇越律例), sometimes known as the "Gia Long Code", remained the main civil code of the Nguyễn dynasty until the Emperor issued the nearly identical Civil Code of Annam and Civil Code of Tonkin.

A number of the legal documents in effect in the French Republic were also applied to French Indochina, these included the Code Napoléon of 1804, the Code de commerce of 1807, the Code d'instruction criminelle, and the French penal code of 1810. These laws took effect in French Indochina on the date that the governor-general issued decrees that they would also apply to the federation.

The legislative decrees of the governor-general had to be sent to the minister of colonies for consideration; the minister would then approve or disapprove the decrees. However, the minister of colonies was not entitled to make any amendments to the decrees, and if they wished to alter it they would have to draft it and then send the draft to the president of France. Only French presidential decrees could overturn the decrees of the governor-general. Executive decrees did not have to be sent to Metropolitan France for review and immediately came into effect.

Throughout Vietnam thousands of villages had their own independent legal codes that governed the social relations within the village community, thousands of written regulations existed and the central administration often recognised them. These legal codes were known as the Hương ước (鄉約), Hương lệ (鄉例) and Lệ làng (例廊), which could be translated as "rural covenants", and also existed in China and Korea. The Hương ước contained rules about various legal practices like land management, marriage, labour relations, arbitration of disputes, as well as local customs such as family relations, village relations, ghosts, ancestor worship, sacrifice, mourning, and longing. Both the government-general of French Indochina and the government of the Nguyễn dynasty attempted reform these rules and regulations in their favour. To expand their power into Vietnamese hamlets and villages the French administration issued models for the villages to follow, but many Vietnamese villages still functioned independent of the French and Nguyễn administrations.

== Demographics ==
=== Population ===
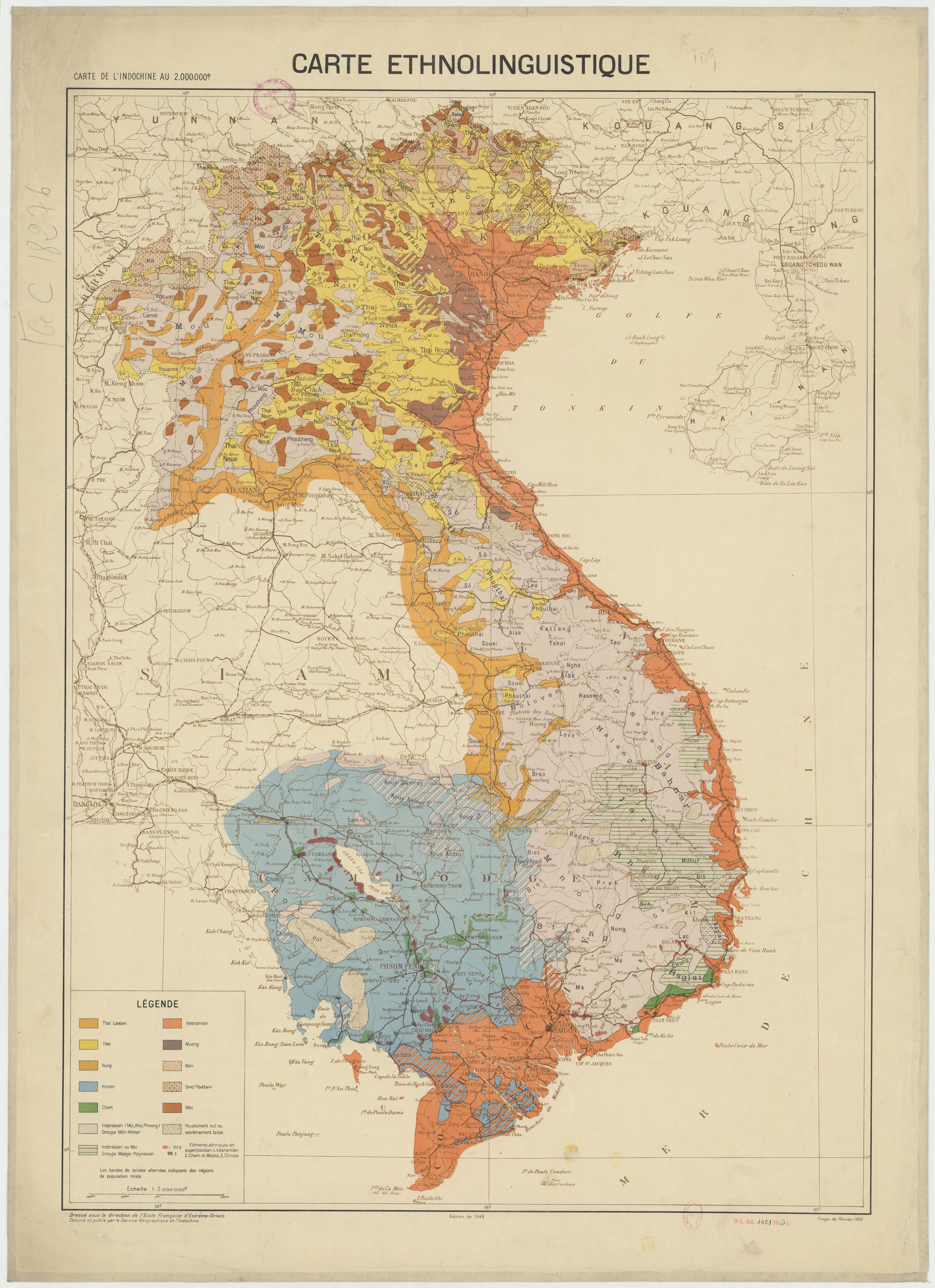
Ethnolinguistic map of Indochina.

The Viet, Khmer, and Lao ethnic groups formed the majority of their respective colony's populations. Cham communities were dispersed across southern Indochina lowlands. Minority groups in the Central Highlands, such as the Jarai, Rade, Bahnar, and Koho were collectively known as Montagnards. Mountain regions of northern Indochina was home to various ethnic groups, including the Muong, Khmu, Hmong, Yao, Tày, Nùng, and Thái.

Ethnic Chinese were largely concentrated in major cities and towns, especially the Hoa in Cochinchina and the Chen in Cambodia, where they became heavily involved in trade and commerce. The rural Chinese Nùng mostly resided in coastal Hải Ninh Province. There was also a tiny French minority which accounted for 0.2% of the population (or 39,000 people) by 1940. Around 95% of French Indochina's population was rural in a 1913 estimate, although urbanisation did slowly grow over the course of French rule. (Note: Vietnam alone has fifty-four ethnic groups, presented at the Ethnographic Museum of Hanoi.)

=== Religion ===
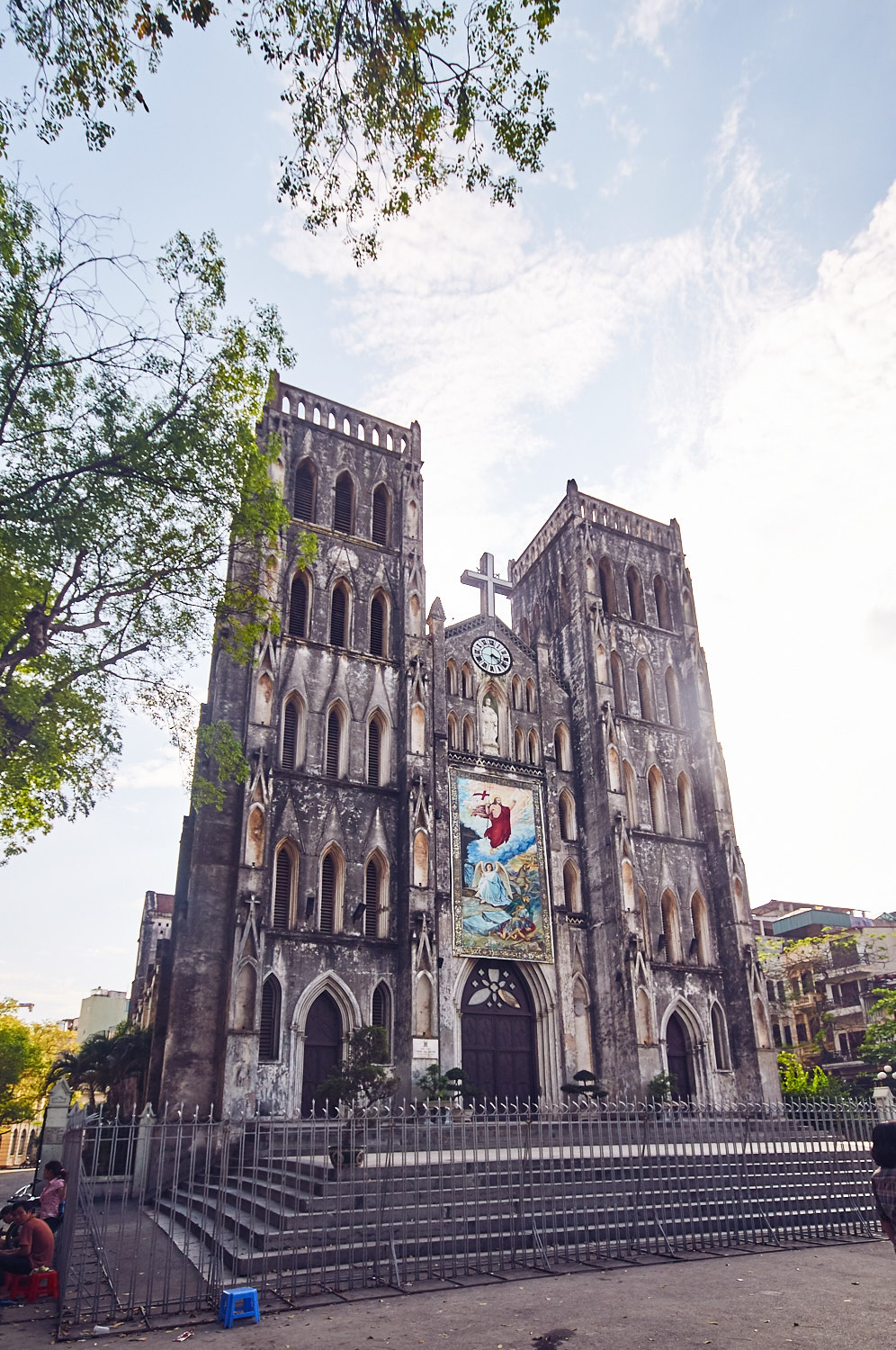
The Cathédrale Saint-Joseph de Hanoï.

Many religions, including various forms of Buddhism and folk religion, were practiced in French Indochina. Longstanding religious faiths, along with newly emergent ones such as Cao Đài and Hòa Hảo, underwent transformations during this period. The secularist French Third Republic and its top colonial officials in Indochina took a skeptical stance toward organized religion.

Colonial administrators ironically leaned on Confucianism, especially its civil service model, to govern Annam, Tonkin, and even Cochinchina. Influential figures like Pierre Pasquier viewed Confucianism as the authentic core of Vietnamese society and a useful means of maintaining order and legitimizing French rule. Meanwhile, in Laos and Cambodia, the colonial authorities leveraged Theravada Buddhism, including its schools, monastic order, and organizations, to help govern the population. Colonial administrators distrusted both Mahayana Buddhism and the local Catholics in Vietnam. Buddhists, Catholics, as well as Cao Đài and Hòa Hảo followers, were nationalists and broadly anti-colonial.

=== French settlements ===
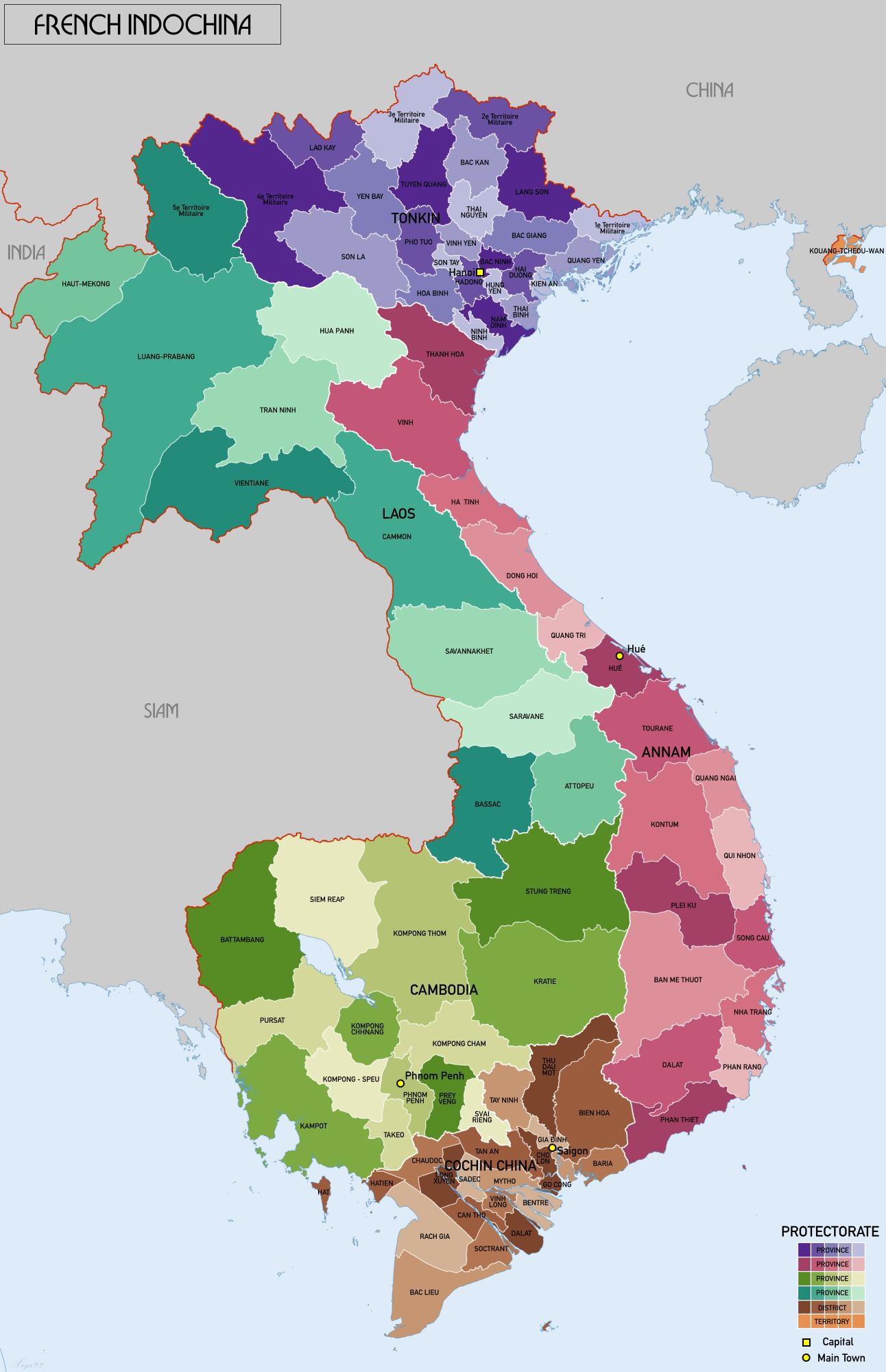
Subdivisions of French Indochina

Unlike Algeria, French settlement in Indochina did not occur at a grand scale. By 1940, only about 34,000 French civilians lived in French Indochina, along with a smaller number of French military personnel and government workers (6,000). Of these almost half, 16,550, lived in Cochinchina, the vast majority living in Saigon.

The principal reasons why French settlement did not grow in a manner similar to that in French North Africa (which had a population of over 1 million French civilians) were because French Indochina was seen as a colonie d'exploitation économique (colony for economic exploitation) rather than a colonie de peuplement (settlement colony helping Metropolitan France from being overpopulated), and because Indochina was distant from France itself.

=== Language ===
During French colonial rule, the French language was the principal language of education, government, trade, and media and French was widely introduced to the general population. French became widespread among urban and semi-urban populations and became the principal language of the elite and educated. This was most notable in the colonies of Tonkin and Cochinchina (Northern and Southern Vietnam respectively), where French influence was most heavy, while Annam, Laos and Cambodia were less influenced by French education. Despite the dominance of French in official and educational settings, local populations still largely spoke their native languages. After French rule ended, the French language was still used to a certain extent among the new governments. Today, French continues to be taught as a second language in the former colonies and used in some administrative affairs.

== Economy ==
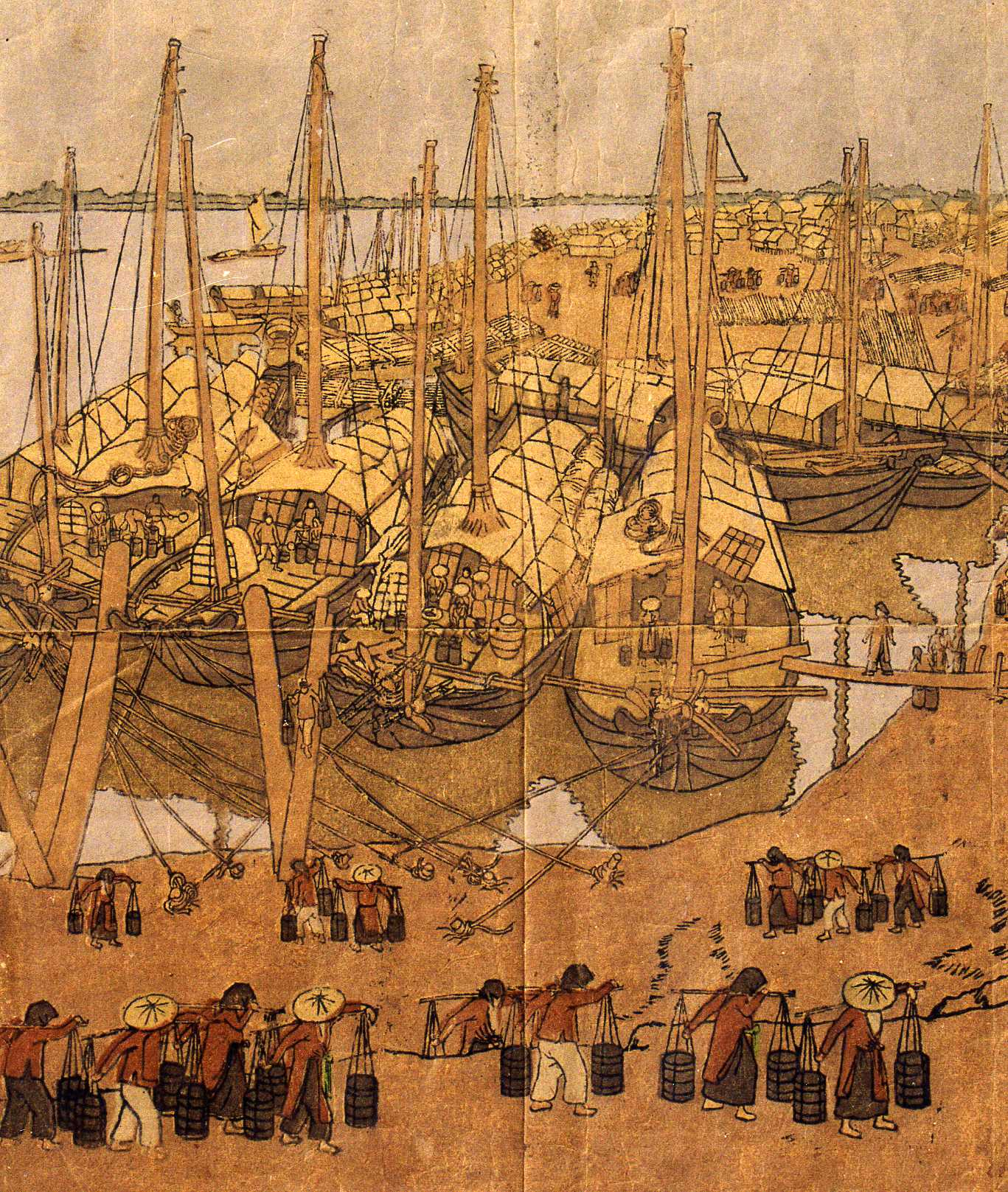
Boats on the Red River Wharf by Đỗ Đức Thuận, 1930.

French Indochina was designated as a colonie d'exploitation (colony of economic exploitation) by the French government. Funding for the colonial government came by means of taxes on locals and the French government established a near monopoly on the trade of opium, salt and rice alcohol. The French administration established quotas of consumption for each Vietnamese village, thereby compelling villagers to purchase and consume set amounts of these monopolised goods. The trade of those three products formed about 44% of the colonial government's budget in 1920 but declined to 20% by 1930 as the colony began to economically diversify.

The colony's principal bank was the Banque de l'Indochine, established in 1875 and was responsible for minting the colony's currency, the Indochinese piastre. Indochina was the second most invested-in French colony by 1940 after Algeria, with investments totalling up to 6.7 million francs.

During the first six months of World War I, the government-general would expel all German and Austro-Hungarian people living in French Indochina. The two pre-war import/export houses, Speidel & Co. and F. Engler & Co., were officially re-organised as French companies; however, in reality they continued to operate under both German control and using German capital. During the 1910s, Speidel & Co. was the largest importer of European goods into the country with Engler being one of its major competitors. After the German owners were expelled from the company lower level employees tried to continue running these companies despite increasing push back from the French colonial authorities by means of arbitrary customs enforcement, freight interference, and regulatory aggravations. Later the French would seize all of the German Speidel Company's warehouses and would sell the seized goods at low prices both to Vietnamese consumers and Chinese exporters to try to increase revenue. These goods included rice, wine, and canned goods.

During World War I, export regulations kept changing which the Chinese export businesses took advantage of by purchasing rice for minimal prices from the Vietnamese farmers who grew it and then deliberately passing along the risks of the export trade to those small Vietnamese farmers who were the least able to bear the losses involved.

As the war made both imports and exports from and to Europe more difficult, French Indochina would increase trade with other Pacific countries. During the war period, import businesses would import flour from the United States and dairy products from Australia, though at lower levels than during the pre-war period. Prior to World War I, French Indochina had an annual flour import worth $950,000 and an annual condensed milk import worth $135,000, but during the war they would import only half this amount from the United States and about one fifth the amount of condensed milk from Australia.

In this context, the French colonizers opened the country's first business school in Hanoi for colonized students.

Beginning in the 1930s, France began to exploit the region for its natural resources and to economically diversify the colony. Cochinchina, Annam and Tonkin (encompassing modern-day Vietnam) became a source of tea, rice, coffee, pepper, coal, zinc, and tin, while Cambodia became a centre for rice and pepper crops. Only Laos was seen initially as an economically unviable colony, although timber was harvested at a small scale from there.

At the turn of the 20th century, the growing automobile industry in France resulted in the growth of the rubber industry in French Indochina, and plantations were built throughout the colony, especially in Annam and Cochinchina. France soon became a leading producer of rubber through its Indochina colony and Indochinese rubber became prized in the industrialised world. The success of rubber plantations in French Indochina resulted in an increase in investment in the colony by various firms, such as Michelin. With the growing number of investments in the colony's mines and rubber, tea and coffee plantations, French Indochina began to industrialise as factories opened in the colony. These new factories produced textiles, cigarettes, beer and cement which were then exported throughout the French Empire.

=== Infrastructure ===
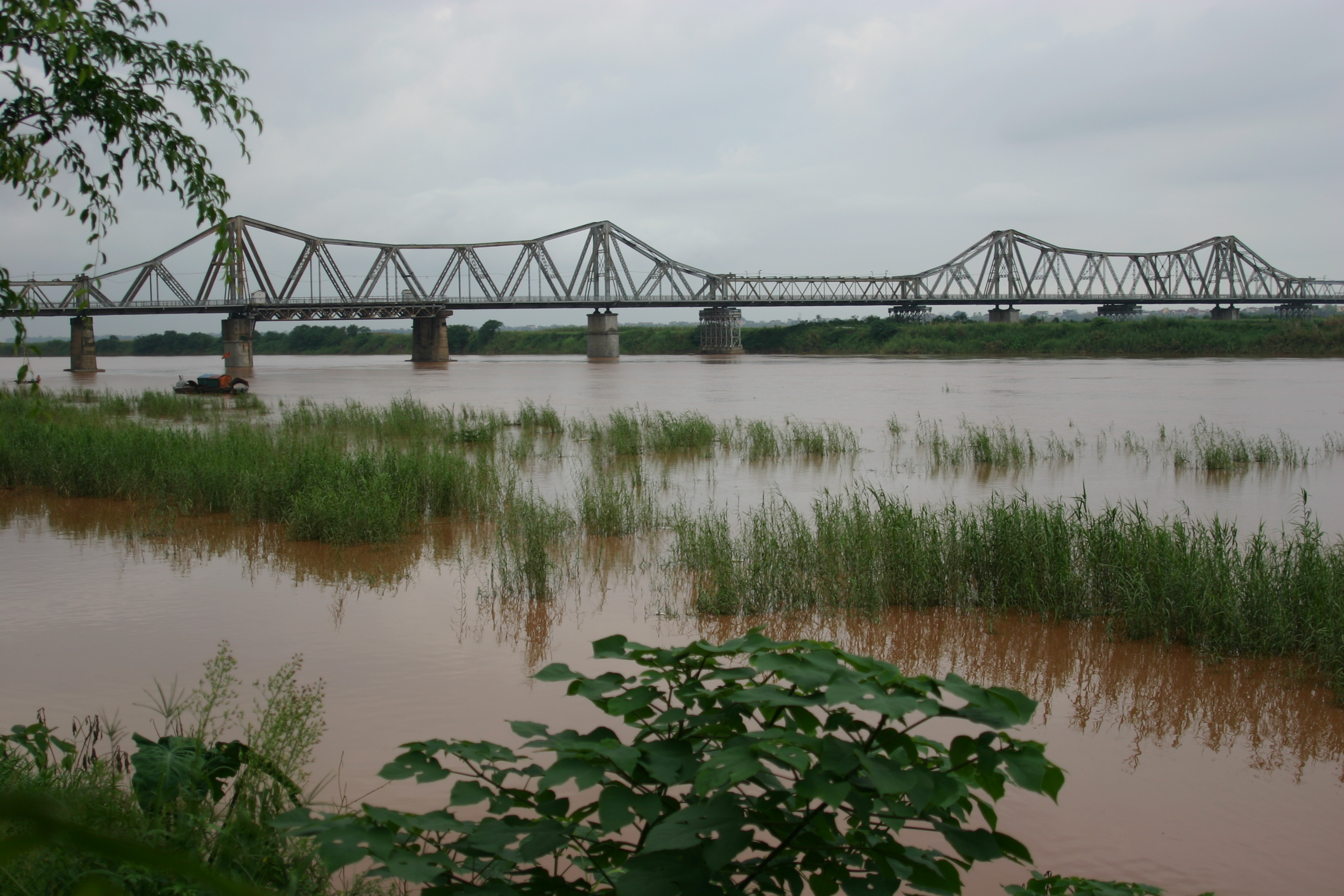
The Paul Doumer Bridge, now Long Biên Bridge, in Hanoi.

Musée Louis Finot in Hanoi, built by Ernest Hébrard in 1932, now the National Museum of Vietnamese History.

When French Indochina was viewed as an economically important colony for France, the French government set a goal to improve the transport and communications networks in the colony. Saigon became a principal port in Southeast Asia and rivalled the British port of Singapore as the region's busiest commercial centre. By 1937 Saigon was the sixth busiest port in the entire French Empire.

In the 19th century, the French colonial administration worked to develop regular trading networks and an efficient transport infrastructure between Indochina and southwest China. The primary motivation for such an effort was to facilitate export of European goods to China. A railway would also give France access to Yunnan's natural resources, mineral resources and opium, and open up the Chinese market for Indochinese products, such as rice, dry fish, wood and coal. Thus in the early 20th century, they completed the Kunming–Haiphong railway connecting the important port city of Haiphong with the Yunnanese capital city of Kunming.

In 1936, the Trans-Indochinois railway linking Hanoi and Saigon opened. Further improvements in the colony's transport infrastructures led to easier travel between France and Indochina. By 1939, it took no more than a month by ship to travel from Marseille to Saigon and around five days by aeroplane from Paris to Saigon. Underwater telegraph cables were installed in 1921.

As elsewhere in the world, the railways in French Indochina were the sites of active union and labour organisation.

French settlers further added their influence on the colony by constructing buildings in the form of Beaux-Arts and added French-influenced landmarks, such as the Hanoi Opera House (modeled on the Palais Garnier), the Hanoi St. Joseph's Cathedral (resembling the Notre Dame de Paris) and the Saigon Notre-Dame Basilica. The French colonists also built a number of cities and towns in Indochina which served various purposes from trading outposts to resort towns. The most notable examples include Sa Pa in northern Vietnam, Đà Lạt in central Vietnam and Pakse in Laos.

== Architectural legacy ==
The governments of Vietnam, Laos, and Cambodia have previously been reluctant to promote their colonial architecture as an asset for tourism. However, in recent times, the new generation of local authorities has somewhat "embraced" the architecture and advertise it. The heaviest concentration of French-era buildings are in Hanoi, Đà Lạt, Haiphong, Ho Chi Minh City, Huế, and various places in Cambodia and Laos such as Luang Prabang, Vientiane, Phnom Penh, Battambang, Kampot, and Kep.

== In popular culture ==
- In the Walt Disney and Intermondia Films' film, Niok l'éléphant, a young Khmer boy from the French protectorate of Cambodia in French Indochina 'adopts' a baby elephant and raises it as a pet. His father later sells it to a Chinese merchant. The boy recaptures the pachyderm, however, and frees it back into the jungle.
- The 1992 film Indochine tells the story of Éliane Devries, a French plantation owner, and of her adopted Vietnamese daughter, Camille, set against the backdrop of the rising Vietnamese nationalist movement.
- In MGM's 1939 Lady of the Tropics, a freeloading American playboy falls in love with a local woman while visiting French Indochina with his girlfriend and her family on her father's yacht.

== See also ==
- East Indies
- French Union
- List of governors-general of French Indochina
- Political administration of French Indochina
- List of French possessions and colonies

== Bibliography ==
- Addington, Larry H. (2000). America's War in Vietnam: A Short Narrative History. Indiana University Press. p. 30. ISBN 0-253-21360-6.
- Bailey, Gauvin Alexander (2018). "Photos of European Colonial Architecture Around the World". Colonial Architecture Project. Queen's University at Kingston, Canada. Archived from the original on 23 May 2019.
- Brocheux, Pierre; Hémery, Daniel (2004). Indochine: la colonisation ambiguë 1858–1954 [Indochina: An Ambiguous Colonization, 1858–1954] (in French). La Découverte. ISBN 978-2-7071-3412-7.
- Chandler, David (2007). A History of Cambodia (4th ed.). Boulder, Colorado: Westview Press. ISBN 978-0-8133-4363-1.
- Chapuis, Oscar (1995). A History of Vietnam: From Hong Bang to Tu Duc. Greenwood Publishing Group. ISBN 0-313-29622-7.
- Chapuis, Oscar (2000). The Last Emperors of Vietnam: From Tu Duc to Bao Dai. Greenwood Publishing Group. ISBN 978-0-313-31170-3.
- "The Country's Cultural and Tourist Center". Hochiminh City. HCM City Web. 2005. Archived from the original on 13 December 2017.
- Duiker, William (1976). The Rise of Nationalism in Vietnam, 1900–1941. Ithaca, New York: Cornell University Press. ISBN 0-8014-0951-9.
- Duong, Van Nguyen (2008). The Tragedy of the Vietnam War: a South Vietnamese Officer's Analysis. McFarland. ISBN 978-0-7864-3285-1.
- Edwards, Penny (2007). Cambodge: The Cultivation of a Nation, 1860–1945. Honolulu: U of Hawaii Press. ISBN 978-0-8248-2923-0.
- Errington, Elizabeth Jane (1990). The Vietnam War as history: edited by Elizabeth Jane Errington and B.J.C. McKercher. Greenwood Publishing Group. ISBN 0-275-93560-4.
- Evans, Grant (2002). A Short History of Laos. Crow's Nest, Australia: Allen and Unwin. ASIN B000MBU21O.
- Forbes, Andrew; Henley, David (2012). Vietnam Past and Present: The North (History of French colonialism in Tonkin). Chiang Mai: Cognoscenti Books. ASIN B006DCCM9Q.
- Goscha, Christopher (2016). Vietnam: A New History. Basic Books. ISBN 9780465094370.
- Harris, Richard. "Indochina and the French" History Today (Feb 1955) 5#3 pp 84–94.
- Kahin, George McTurnin; John W. Lewis (1967). The United States in Vietnam: An analysis in depth of the history of America's involvement in Vietnam. Delta Books.
- Llewellyn, Jennifer; Jim Southey; Steve Thompson (2018). "Conquest and Colonisation of Vietnam". Alpha History. Archived from the original on 20 July 2023.
- Lockhart, Bruce McFarland; Duiker, William J. (2010). The A to Z of Vietnam. Rowman & Littlefield. ISBN 978-0-8108-7646-0.
- Logevall, Fredrik. Embers of War: The Fall of an Empire and the Making of America's Vietnam (2014). Pulitzer Prize
- Marr, David (1971). Vietnamese Anticolonialism, 1885–1925. Berkeley: University of California Press. ISBN 0-520-01813-3.
- Marr, David (1982). Vietnamese Tradition on Trial, 1920–1945. Berkeley: University of California Press. ISBN 0-520-04180-1.
- Marr, David (1995). Vietnam 1945: The Quest for Power. Berkeley: University of California Press. ISBN 0-520-07833-0.
- McLeod, Mark (1991). The Vietnamese Response to French Intervention, 1862–1874. New York: Praeger. ISBN 0-275-93562-0.
- Murray, Martin J. (1980). The Development of Capitalism in Colonial Indochina (1870–1940). Berkeley: University of California Press. ISBN 0-520-04000-7.
- Neville, Peter (2007). Britain in Vietnam: Prelude to Disaster, 1945–6. Psychology Press. ISBN 978-0-415-35848-4.
- Osborne, Milton (1969). The French Presence in Cochinchina and Cambodia: Rule and Response (1859–1905). Ithaca, New York: Cornell University Press. ASIN B000K13QGO.
- Owen, Norman G. (2005). The Emergence Of Modern Southeast Asia: A New History – Vietnam 1700 – 1885. U of Hawaii Press. ISBN 978-0-8248-2890-5.
- Perkins, Mandaley (2006). Hanoi, Adieu: A bittersweet memoir of French Indochina. Sydney: Harper Perennial. ISBN 978-0-7322-8197-7.
- Peters, Erica (2012). Appetites and Aspirations in Vietnam. AltaMira Press.
- Stuart-Fox, Martin (1997). A History of Laos. Cambridge, UK: Cambridge University Press. ISBN 0-521-59235-6.
- Tarling, Nicholas (2001). Imperialism in Southeast Asia: "A Fleeting, Passing Phase". London and New York: Routledge. ISBN 0-415-23289-9.
- Thomazi, Auguste (1934). La Conquête de l'Indochine. Paris: Payot.
- Tønnesson, Stein (2010). Vietnam 1946: How the War Began. University of California Press. ISBN 978-0-520-25602-6.
- Tuchman, Barbara Werheim (1985). The March of Folly: From Troy to Vietnam. Random House. ISBN 0-345-30823-9.
- Tucker, Spencer C. (1999). Vietnam. University Press of Kentucky. p. 29. ISBN 0-8131-0966-3 – via Internet Archive.
- Tully, John (2003). France on the Mekong: A History of the Protectorate in Cambodia, 1863–1953. Lanham, Maryland: University Press of America. ISBN 0-7618-2431-6.
- "Vietnam". L'aménagement linguistique dans le monde (in French). Archived from the original on 21 January 2022.
- "The Vietnam War Seeds of Conflict 1945–1960". The History Place. 1999. Archived from the original on 17 December 2008.
- Watson, D. R. (1970) "The French and Indo-China" History Today (Aug 1970, Vol. 20 Issue 8, pp 534–542; online survey
- Woodside, Alexander (1976). Community and Revolution in Modern Vietnam. Boston: Houghton Mifflin. ISBN 0-395-20367-8.
- Zinoman, Peter (2001). The Colonial Bastille: A History of Imprisonment in Vietnam, 1862–1940. Berkeley: University of California Press. ISBN 0-520-22412-4.
