= Phạm Duy =

Vietnamese songwriter (1921–2013)

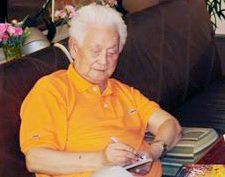
- Pham Duy in 2008

Background information
- Also known as: Phạm Duy
- Born: Phạm Duy Cẩn; 5 October 1921; Hanoi, French Indochina (now Hanoi, Vietnam)
- Died: 27 January 2013 (aged 91) Ho Chi Minh City, Vietnam
- Occupations: Songwriter, musician, vocalist, MC
- Years active: 1943-2013

Phạm Duy (5 October 1921 – 27 January 2013) was a Vietnamese songwriter. With more than one thousand songs to his credit, he is widely considered one of the three most salient and influential figures of modern Vietnamese music, along with Văn Cao and Trịnh Công Sơn. His entire body of work was banned in North Vietnam during the Vietnam War and subsequently in unified Vietnam for more than 30 years. Upon his repatriation in 2005, the government began to ease restrictions on some of his work.

== Biography ==
Phạm Duy was born as Phạm Duy Cẩn, on 5 October 1921, in his house at the Hàng Thùng Street of Hanoi City, Tonkin, French Indochina. His father Phạm Duy Tốn was a progressive journalist and writer, and one of the earliest writers of European-style short stories. Phạm Duy Tốn was also one of the founders of the Tonkin Free School movement. Phạm Duy's father died when he was two, and he was raised largely by his older brother Phạm Duy Khiêm, whom he described as a strict and tyrannical figure. Phạm Duy Khiêm later became a professor and South Vietnam's ambassador to France, as well as a Francophone writer.

He attended Thăng Long Primary School where his teachers included Trần Trọng Kim and Võ Nguyên Giáp. He then attended the Artistic College and the Practical Industry Vocational College. He taught himself music and studied in France in 1954-55 under Robert Lopez and as an unregistered student at the Institut de Musicologie in Paris.

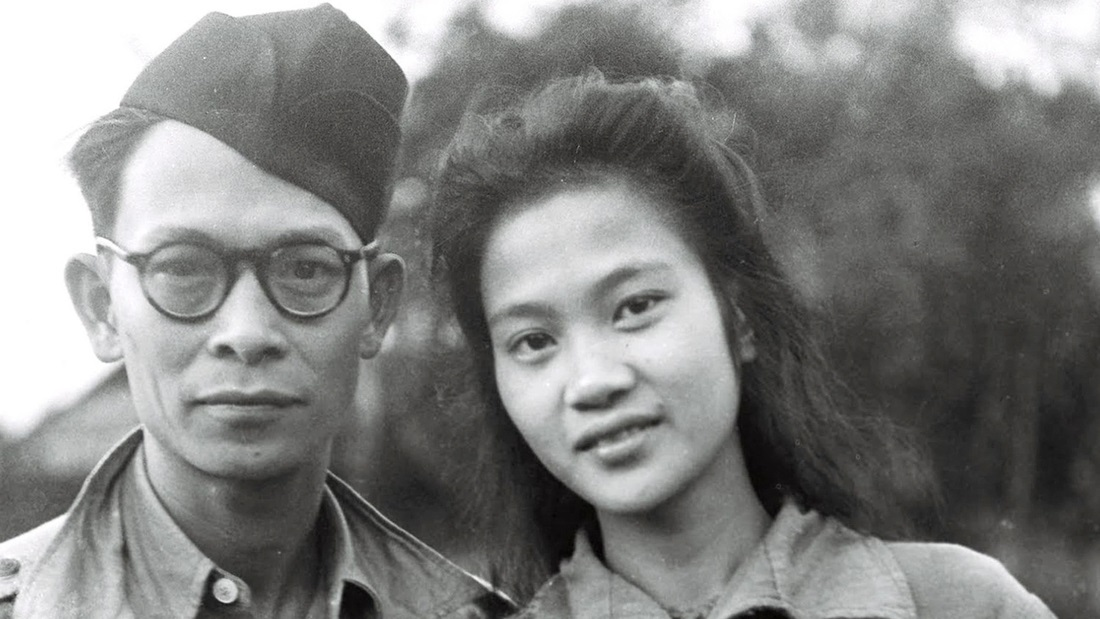
Phạm Duy and singer Thái Hằng in a Viet Minh maquis, 1949.

He started his musical career as a singer in the Đức Huy musical troupe, performing around the country in 1943–44. He then joined a musical cadre for the Viet Minh during their resistance against the French. He and the musician Văn Cao became great friends while there and they collaborated on some of their earliest songs together. In May 1951, he left the Viet Minh after 6 years for the State of Vietnam-controlled Hanoi and subsequently moved south to Saigon after becoming disenchanted with their censorship. His work was subsequently banned in communist-controlled areas. In 1969 Đỗ Nhuận, a leading young North Vietnamese composer of revolutionary opera, singled out Phạm Duy's music as typical of reactionary music in the South.

=== Exile and return to Vietnam ===
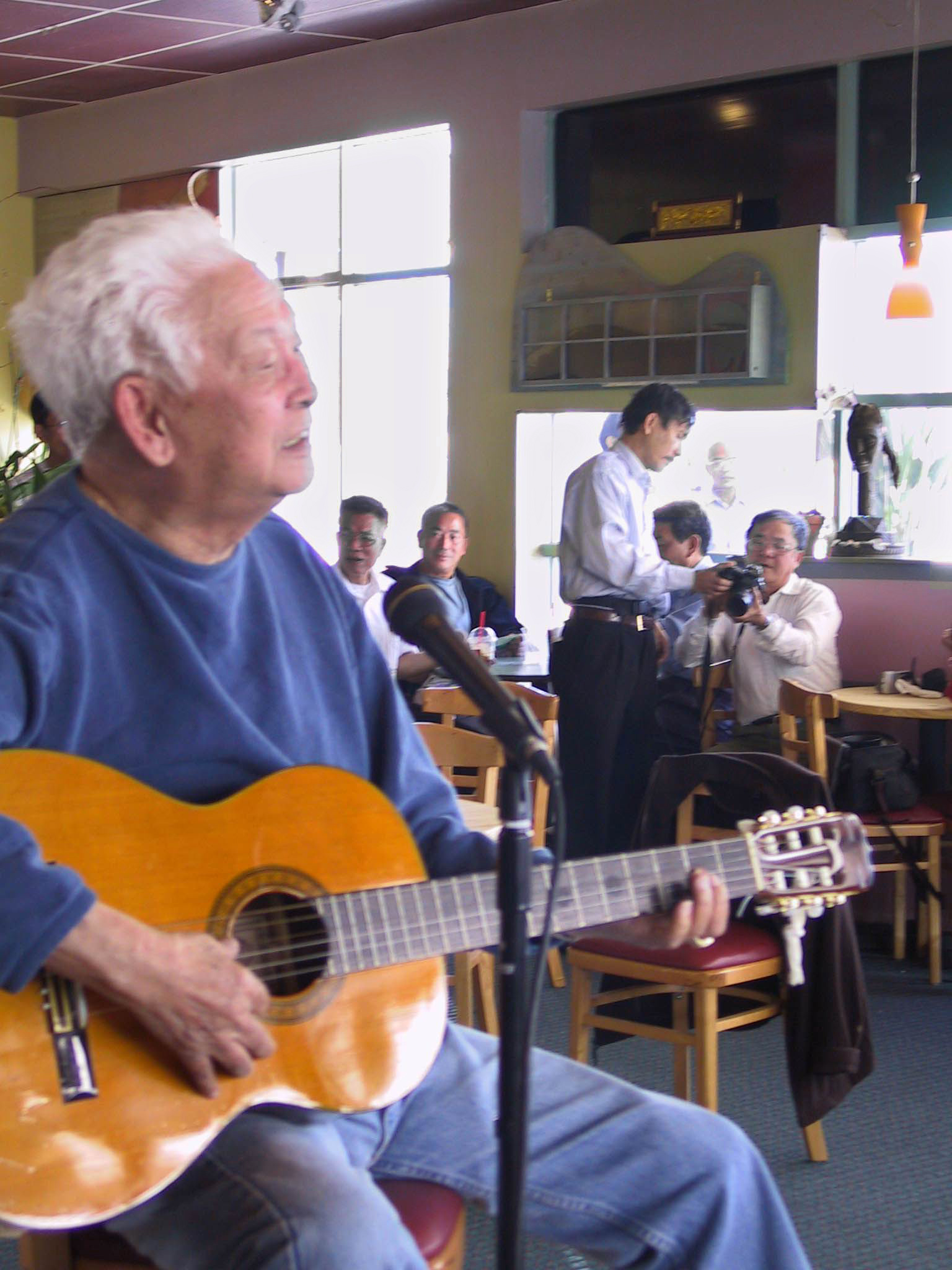
Phạm Duy performing in Saigon

After the collapse of the Republic of Vietnam, Phạm Duy and his family moved to the United States where he settled in Midway City, California. His music was banned in Vietnam between 1975 and 2005. However, his music continued to be performed and widely known both inside and outside Vietnam. He pursued a minstrel's life and appeared regularly all over the world to sing his new refugees' songs (tị nạn ca) and prisoners' songs (ngục ca), and songs derived from the poems of his friend Hoàng Cầm (which he termed Hoàng Cầm ca).

Phạm Duy first returned to Vietnam for visits in 2000. In 2005, he announced that he and his son, the singer Duy Quang, would return permanently. His announced return was greeted with much fanfare in Vietnam, and the government began to ease restrictions on his work. To date, dozens of his songs have been allowed to circulate in Vietnam again.

=== Death ===
Phạm Duy died on 27 January 2013, in Saigon, one month after the death of his eldest son Duy Quang. His wife Thai Hang had died in 1999 to lung cancer. At 91 years of age he had been suffering heart and liver disease and gout. A documentary film Pham Duy, music and life is yet to be released. Mirroring widespread reaction from the public and his fellow artists, singer Anh Tuyet said, "Hearing that he died, I'm melting ..." Acclaimed film director Đặng Nhật Minh, who was contracted to direct a movie about Phạm Duy's life, expressed his regret of not being able to do it during his lifetime.

An impromptu benefit concert was held in his honour on 1 February, with the 60 million VND proceeds going to his family. Thousands of well-wishers, including many of the most notable names in Vietnamese music, paid their respects at his home before he was buried on February 3, 2013, in Binh Duong Park Cemetery. At his funeral, attendees spontaneously sang some of his most famous songs.

== Family ==
Phạm Duy's father was Phạm Duy Tốn, a noted journalist and writer, and his mother was Mrs Nguyễn Thị Hòa, a famous charity. He was the youngest of five children, and his eldest brother was Phạm Duy Khiêm, who became a Francophone writer.

He was considered the "patriarch" of a musical dynasty. His wife, the singer Thái Hằng, was the older sister of the composer Phạm Đình Chương as well as of the singer Thái Thanh, who gained widespread fame performing many of Phạm Duy's works. His eight children have achieved success in music as part of the band The Dreamers who performed around the world. His eldest son was the singer Duy Quang (who predeceased him by more than a month), and another son is musician Duy Cường. His daughters include the singers Thái Hiền and Thái Thảo. Thái Thảo's husband is the noted singer Tuấn Ngọc. Among his nieces and nephews are the singers Ý Lan (daughter of Thái Thanh) and Mai Hương.

== Legacy ==
Professor Vu Duc Vuong, a director at Hoa Sen University, said that Pham Duy was Vietnam's most important musician of the 20th century, and compared him favourably to Nguyễn Du, Hồ Xuân Hương, and Xuân Diệu. He is considered one of the most prolific and varied musicians of modern Vietnamese music, as well as one of those who molded it from its infancy. Generations of Vietnamese grew up memorising many of his songs and many singers gained fame performing his works, most notably his sister-in-law Thái Thanh.

Ethnomusicologist Jason Gibbs described Phạm Duy as "a writer of undeniable sensitivity and created works that Vietnamese will remember for hundreds of years. There is a remarkable directness, honesty and depth of feeling in his lyrics, during a time when many Vietnamese creative figures had to be guarded in their expression."

In the last years of his life, he campaigned unsuccessfully to have the entire oeuvre of his works, excepting those that "the government would deem inappropriate", to freely circulate in Vietnam again. Among his strongest advocates are renowned musicologist Trần Văn Khê, historian Dương Trung Quốc, and researcher Nguyễn Đắc Xuân, who wanted the government to allow, at minimum, his song cycles Con đường cái quan (The Mandarin Road) and Mẹ Việt Nam (Mother Vietnam), particularly its concluding song "Việt Nam Việt Nam". The two song cycles, according to Khê, are "masterpieces deserving to be disseminated across the whole country because of their true artistic qualities". With these two cycles, Pham Duy "talked about a totally unified Vietnam, painted a picture of Vietnam complete geographically and culturally, from the breadth of its history to the depth of its soul, from its philosophy to its outlook on life."

After his music was banned in Vietnam for more than 30 years, he and his music were considered to have been forgotten by the newer generations. However, according to the musician Tuấn Khanh, the outpouring of reaction on social media before and after his death clearly showed that his name is not so easily forgotten.

== Criticism ==
Phạm Duy's 2005 move from the U.S., where he resided since 1975, to Saigon was cause for much criticism from both outside and within Vietnam. Some overseas Vietnamese accused him of hypocrisy and of showing sympathy towards the communist government of Vietnam, even though a number of his songs have been about resistance, refugees, and their Vietnam. In contrast, some musicians from within Vietnam, particularly Hanoi, saw the acclaim he received on his return as inappropriate for someone whom they consider a traitor.

In 2006, his first post-1975 concert in Vietnam was well received by critics. However, composer Nguyễn Lưu wrote an article titled "[You] can't acclaim" in which he criticised Phạm Duy's works, citing many instances in which he saw bourgeois or anti-communist lyrics. The article received much criticism from readers, with some calling the criticism "simplistic" or "ignorant".

In 2009, Musician Phạm Tuyên, author of many well-known socialist songs (and son of the journalist Phạm Quỳnh), stated that to judge him, one must look at his contributions as well as his mistakes. To him, the media mentioning Pham Duy's great music while ignoring all his past mistakes is unfair to musicians who have spent their whole lives devoted to the Revolution. Trọng Bằng, another musician of so-called "red music", said that Phạm Duy had a "sinful past", while the musician Hồng Đăng said that "the true value of an artist is his patriotism...and truthfully only some of [Phạm Duy]'s song received popular success, not all were well-received."

After Phạm Duy's death, Phạm Tuyên said that "my generation is still influenced by Phạm Duy's music...his songs about homeland, country, left a lasting impression on my mind," and that "I was very happy when he returned." However, no representative from the Vietnam Musicians Association attended his funeral, and according to musician Tuấn Khanh, the Propaganda Committee warned the media not to make a big deal out of his death.

== Works ==
=== Periods ===
Pham Duy divided his career into several periods:

- Folk Songs (Dân Ca), which recorded the images of the Vietnamese during the struggle for independence, culminating in his Song Cycles (Truong Ca), which join several folk tunes to proclaim the greatness of the Vietnamese people. Included in this period is his 1968 album, Folk Songs of Vietnam, released on Folkways Records.
- Heart' Songs (Tâm Ca) - which aimed to awake humanity's conscience, to protest against violence and inhumanity.
- Spiritual Songs (Đạo Ca), with a Zen character, which aimed to seek for the truth.
- Vulgar Songs (Tục Ca), which tackled head-on hypocritical attitudes and phony virtues.
- Children's Song (Nhạc thiếu nhi), Young Women's Songs (Nữ Ca) and Peace Songs (Bình Ca), which were songs of joy.
- Resistance Songs and for the motherland
- Refugees Songs and for life in exile.

In addition, his many love songs have been sung and learned by heart by three generations over the last forty years.

=== Notable songs ===
Phạm Duy wrote about 1000 songs. Some of his notable works :

- 1954-1975 - a song about the two migration events in Vietnam during the 20th century, the Operation Passage to Freedom and Fall of Saigon.
- Áo Anh Sứt Chỉ Đường Tà
- Bên Cầu Biên Giới
- Bến Xuân (co-author with Văn Cao)
- Cây Đàn Bỏ Quên
- Chỉ Chừng Đó Thôi
- Chuyện Tình Buồn (Năm Năm Rồi Không Gặp)
- Cô Bắc Kỳ Nho Nhỏ
- Cô Hái Mơ
- Con Đường Tình Ta Đi
- Còn Chút Gì Để Nhớ (1972)
- Đưa Em Tìm Động Hoa Vàng
- Ðường Chiều Lá Rụng
- Em Hiền Như Masoeur
- Giết Người Trong Mộng
- Giọt Mưa Trên Lá
- Hoa Rụng Ven Sông
- Hoa Xuân
- Kiếp Nào Có Yêu Nhau
- Kỷ Niệm
- Kỷ Vật Cho Em
- Minh Họa Kiều - song form of The Tale of Kieu
- Mùa Thu Chết
- Ngày Xưa Hoàng Thị
- Nghìn Trùng Xa Cách
- Nha Trang Ngày Về
- Ngậm Ngùi (Poem by Huy Cận)
- Nhớ Người Thương Binh
- Nước Mắt Mùa Thu
- Nước Non Ngàn Dặm Ra Đi
- Phố Buồn
- Quê Nghèo
- Tâm Sự Gửi Về Đâu
- Thà Như Giọt Mưa
- Thuyền Viễn Xứ (1970)
- Tình Ca (1953) - a song about one's love for country. When this song was allowed to circulate in Vietnam again in 2005, a company bought the rights to the first 10 notes of the song to use in promotions for 100 million VND.
- Tình Hoài Hương (1952)
- Tình Hờ
- Tiễn Em
- Tóc Mai Sợi Vắn Sợi Dài
- Tôi Còn Yêu Tôi Cứ Yêu
- Tôi Đang Mơ Giấc Mộng Dài
- Tổ khúc Bầy Chim Bỏ Xứ
- Trả Lại Em Yêu
- Tuổi Ngọc
- Tuổi Thần Tiên
- Trường ca Con Đường Cái Quan [The Mandarin Road] - a cycle of 19 songs detailing a journey from northern to southern Vietnam. He started writing the songs in 1954 and competed them in 1960. The purpose of these songs was to affirm the cultural unity of Vietnam and to protest the partition of the country. These songs are still banned in Vietnam.
- Trường ca Mẹ Việt Nam [Mother Vietnam] - a cycle of many songs about Vietnam personified as mothers. These songs are still banned in Vietnam.
  - Việt Nam Việt Nam - the last song in the cycle, it enjoyed the status of an unofficial national anthem in South Vietnam. Before dying, he expressed his wish for this song to be allowed to circulate in his native country.
- Vết Thù Trên Lưng Ngựa Hoang (co-author with Ngọc Chánh)
- Vợ Chồng Quê
- Yêu Em Vào Cõi Chết

Phạm Duy has also written lyrics for many foreign songs and brought them to Vietnamese audiences. Some examples included:

- Chuyện Tình Yêu
- Dòng Sông Xanh
- Khi Xưa Ta Bé (Bang Bang)
- Ngày Tân Hôn
- Que Sera Sera
- Trở Về Mái Nhà Xưa

=== Books ===
- Phạm Duy wrote an autobiography (Hồi Ký Phạm Duy) which has 4 volumes.
- Phạm-Duy Musics of Vietnam translated Dale R. Whiteside - 1975
