= Nguyễn Văn Tố =

Vietnamese literary scholar

His Excellency Nguyễn Văn Tố
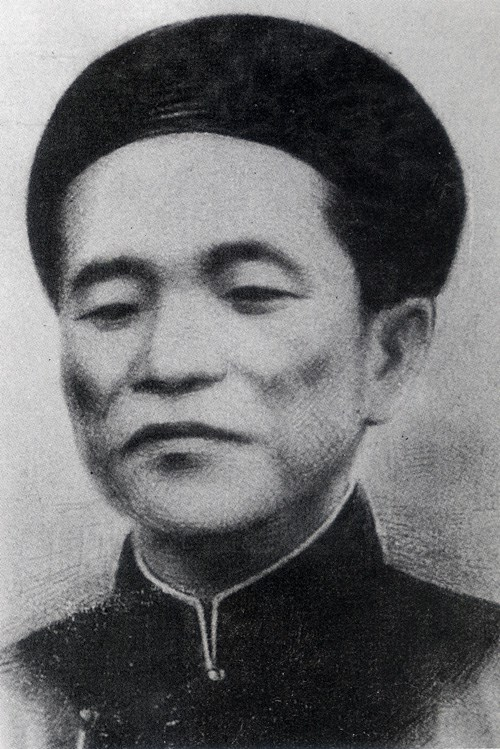

1st Chairman of the National Assembly of the Democratic Republic of Vietnam
- In office 2 March 1946 – 8 November 1946
- President: Hồ Chí Minh
- Preceded by: Position established
- Succeeded by: Bùi Bằng Đoàn

Personal details
- Born: 5 June 1889 Hà Đông, Tonkin, French Indochina
- Died: 7 October 1947 (aged 58) Bắc Kạn, Democratic Republic of Vietnam
- Party: Independent
- Occupation: Literary scholar, Politician

Nguyễn Văn Tố (Vietnamese pronunciation: [ŋwiən˦ˀ˥ van˧˧ to˧˦]; 5 June 1889 – 7 October 1947) pen name Ứng Hoè ([ʔɨŋ˧˦ hwɛ˨˩]), was a Vietnamese literary scholar, journalist and politician. He was the first Chairman of the National Assembly of Vietnam, holding the position from 2 March 1946 to 8 November 1946. Nguyễn was killed in action in Operation Léa in 1947.

In 1906, Nguyễn started working at the French Viễn Đông Bác Cổ in Hanoi. In 1913, he joined the editorial board of the Đông Dương tạp chí — a magazine that actively promoted Quốc ngữ via translated articles from original Chinese and French works, managed by Nguyễn Văn Vĩnh.

Nguyễn was appointed chief editor of Trí Tri magazine in 1921, then chairman of hội Trí Tri (an educational movement for promoting the French language) in 1934.

In 1938, Nguyễn Văn Tố together with Bùi Kỷ, Tôn Thất Bình and other associates with support of Nguyễn Văn Huyên, Trần Trọng Kim, Hoàng Xuân Hãn, Lê Thước formed Hội Truyền bá học chữ Quốc ngữ (en: Association for the diffusion of Quốc ngữ, fr: Association pour la diffusion du Quốc ngữ) to eradicate illiteracy via popular libraries and free Quốc ngữ courses.

From 1941 to 1945, Nguyễn wrote hundreds of articles about Vietnamese culture and Eastern culture for Tri Tân magazine

Nguyễn Văn Tố authored many works under his pen name of Ứng Hoè, but one of his works under his real name was a list of Cham place names that existed or still exist in regions of Central Vietnam once occupied by people of Champa. Most of these villages no longer exist.

== Works ==
- Đại Nam dật sử (Đại Nam's scattered history)
- Sử ta so với sử Tàu (Comparison between Vietnamese history and Chinese history)
- Những ông Nghè triều Lê (Doctorates under the Lê dynasty)
