= Phan Châu Trinh =

Vietnamese nationalist and reformer

Phan Châu Trinh 潘周楨
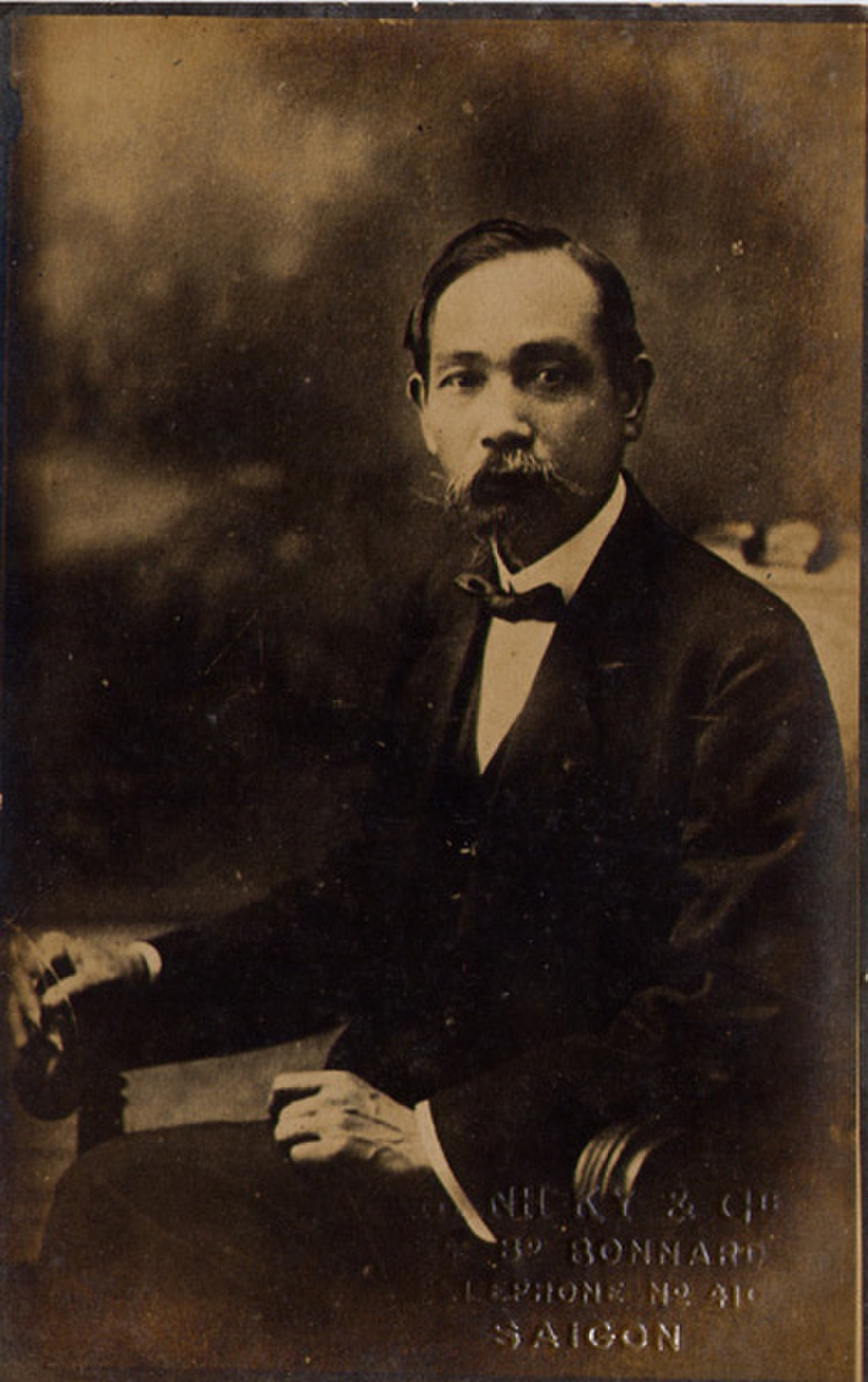
- Born: 9 September 1872; Tam Lộc, Phú Ninh district, Quảng Nam, Đại Nam
- Died: 24 March 1926 (aged 53); Saigon, Cochinchina
- Resting place: Phan Châu Trinh Memorial House, No. 9, Phan Thúc Duyện Street, Tân Sơn Nhất, Tân Bình District, Ho Chi Minh City, Vietnam
- Movement: Duy Tân (Modernization) movement
- Spouse: Lê Thị Tỵ
- Children: Phan Thị Châu Liên; Phan Thị Châu Lan; Phan Châu Dật
- Relatives: Nguyen Thi Binh (granddaughter)

Phan Châu Trinh (Chữ Hán: 潘周楨, 9 September 1872 – 24 March 1926), courtesy name Tử Cán (梓幹), pen name Tây Hồ (西湖) or Hi Mã (希馬), was an early 20th-century Vietnamese nationalist and reformer. He sought to end France's colonial occupation of Vietnam. His method of ending French colonial rule over Vietnam had opposed both violence and turning to other countries for support, and instead believed in attaining Vietnamese liberation by educating the population and by appealing to French democratic principles.

== Early years ==
Phan Châu Trinh was born in Tây Lộc village, Hà Đông district, Thăng Bình fu (now known as Tam Lộc commune, Phú Ninh district) of the Quảng Nam province in 1872. He was the third son of a rich and famous scholar, who joined and became an official in the Cần Vương association of Quảng Nam in 1885. Trinh stopped studying and followed his father for hunting and military training at age of 14. In 1887, his father was killed by the other leaders on suspicion. After that, Cần Vương association of Quảng Nam was also eliminated, Trinh came back home at age of 16. His older brother covered him to continue Confucian studying. In 1900, he obtained a Cử nhân (舉人 senior bachelor) degree in the regional exam. One year later, he got Phó bảng (sub table, under doctorate table) title in the national examination. A total of 22 candidates passed that exam, including two who later became Phan's close companions: Ngô Đức Kế, who received the Tiến sĩ (doctorate) title, and Nguyễn Sinh Sắc, who received the Phó bảng title.

In 1903, Phan was appointed Thừa-biện (a mid-ranking official) of Ministry of Rites.

In 1905, Phan resigned from his post in the mandarin bureaucracy. He had become strongly opposed to the monarchy, traditional Chinese Confucian-influenced Vietnamese court and mandarin system. He called for an end to the monarchy and its replacement with a democratic republic. Having earlier met Phan Bội Châu (Sào Nam) in 1903, in early March 1906, he went to British Hong Kong then Guangdong to meet with him again at Liu Yongfu (ông Lưu)'s house. He made his way there disguised as a disheveled common laborer. He then went to Japan with Sào Nam as part of the Đông-Du movement. They stayed in Yokohama, where they had set up a two-story Japanese house to teach students, which they called Bính-Ngọ-Hiên (Fire Horse Lodge). In early May 1906, they went to Tokyo to inspect the Japanese education and political system.

Phan disagreed with Sào Nam's early ideas of asking for military assistance from Japan, as he didn't trust Japan's militarism. He also had other disagreements with Sào Nam's philosophy. Therefore, they had a friendly argument for a few weeks before he returned to Vietnam. Back in Vietnam he continued to receive letters from Sào Nam arguing about his opposition to the monarchy and his belief that the French could be used. Phan continued to campaign with slogans like "Up with Democracy, Out with Monarchy", and "Making Use of the French in the Quest for Progress". This made Sào Nam quite upset and worried that the movement was fragmenting and that fundraising efforts would fail.

== Duy Tân Movement ==
In the summer of 1906, Phan Châu Trinh returned Vietnam, along with Huỳnh Thúc Kháng, Trần Quý Cáp continued renovation campaign, not only in Quảng Nam but also in neighboring provinces, made it a whole Duy Tân Movement with slogan "Broaden the People’s Mind, Invigorate the People’s Spirit, then Enrich the People’s Well-being" (Vietnamese: Khai dân trí, chấn dân khí, hậu dân sinh).

By the end of the year 1906, he wrote a letter titled Đầu Pháp Chính phủ thư to the governors-general of French Indochina Paul Beau. He asked the French to live up to their civilising mission. He blamed them for the exploitation of the countryside by Vietnamese collaborators. He called on France to develop modern legal, educational, and economic institutions in Vietnam and industrialise the country, and to remove the remnants of the mandarin system. The letter was originally written in Chinese, then translated to French and published on the bulletin of French School of the Far East.

In 1907, he and associates Lương Văn Can, Nguyễn Quyền opened a patriotic modern school in Hanoi for young Vietnamese men and women. The school was called Tonkin Free School (Vietnamese: Đông Kinh Nghĩa Thục), used new translated books like Kang Youwei's Datong Shu and Liang Qichao's Ice-Drinker's studio Collection (Vietnamese: Lương Khải Siêu – Đại đồng Thư, Khang Hữu Vi – Ẩm Băng thất Tùng thư) . He was a lecturer at the school, and Sào Nam's writings were also used. Lương Văn Can was the headteacher, Nguyễn Quyền was the school supervisor. Nguyễn Văn Vĩnh, Phạm Duy Tốn were responsible for applying for the open license of school. The purpose of Đông Kinh Nghĩa Thục is "broaden the people’s mind without taking money". Its ideas attacked the brutality of the French occupation of Vietnam, but also wanted to learn modernisation from the French. The school required scholars to renounce their elitist traditions and learn from the masses. It also offered the peasants a modern education.

After peasant tax revolts erupted in 1908, Phan was arrested, and his school was closed. He was sentenced to death, but it was commuted to life imprisonment after his progressive admirers in France intervened. He was sent to Côn Đảo. In 1911, after three years, he was pardoned and sentenced to house arrest. He said he would rather return to prison than have partial freedom. So instead he was deported to France with his son, where the French continued to monitor him.

He went to Paris in 1915 to get the support of progressive French politicians and Vietnamese exiles. There he worked with Phan Văn Trường, Nguyễn An Ninh, Nguyễn Tất Thành and Nguyễn Thế Truyền in "The Group of Vietnamese Patriots". The group was based at 6 Villa des Gobelins. There they wrote patriotic articles signed with the name Nguyễn Ái Quốc which Hồ Chí Minh later used, "on behalf of the Group of Vietnamese Patriots". He worked as a photograph retoucher to support himself while he was in France. He returned to Saigon in 1925, where he died on 24 March 1926, aged 53. His funeral was attended by over 60,000 people and caused big protests across the country demanding the end of French colonial occupation.

== Debates with other nationalists ==
In Tokyo, Phan told Sào Nam: "The level of their people is so high, and the level of our people is so low! How could we not become slaves? That some students now can enter Japanese schools has been your great achievement. Please stay on in Tokyo to take a quiet rest and devote yourself to writing, and not to making appeals for combat against the French. You should only call for 'popular rights and popular enlightenment.' Once popular rights have been achieved, then we can think about other things."

Sào Nam commented: "Thereafter over more than ten days, he and I debated time and again, and our opinions were diametrically opposed. That is to say, he wished to overthrow the monarchy in order to create a basis for the promotion of popular rights; I, on the contrary, maintained that first the foreign enemy should be driven out, and after our nation's independence was restored we could talk about other things. My plan was to make use of the monarchy, which he opposed absolutely. His plan was to raise up the people to abolish the monarchy, with which I absolutely disagreed. In other words, he and I were pursuing one and the same goal, but our means were considerably different. He wished to start by relying on the French to abolish the monarchy, but I wished to start by driving out the French to restore Vietnam – That was the difference. However, even though his political view was the opposite of mine, he liked me personally a great deal and we roomed together for several weeks. Then all of a sudden he decided to return to our country."

== Works ==
- Trưng Vương bình ngũ lãnh (Trưng Sisters pacified Ngũ Lãnh) composed and performed with Huỳnh Thúc Kháng in 1908 when imprisoned in Côn Đảo island.
- Trung kỳ dân biến thỉ mạt ký (French: Manifestation de 1908 en Annam) written in 1911 when exiled in France, originally in Chinese then translated to Vietnamese and French.
- Tây Hồ thi tập and Santé thi tập: poetry collections including previous composed and new composed poems when Phan was in Santé prison from 1914 to 1915.

== Legacy and memory ==
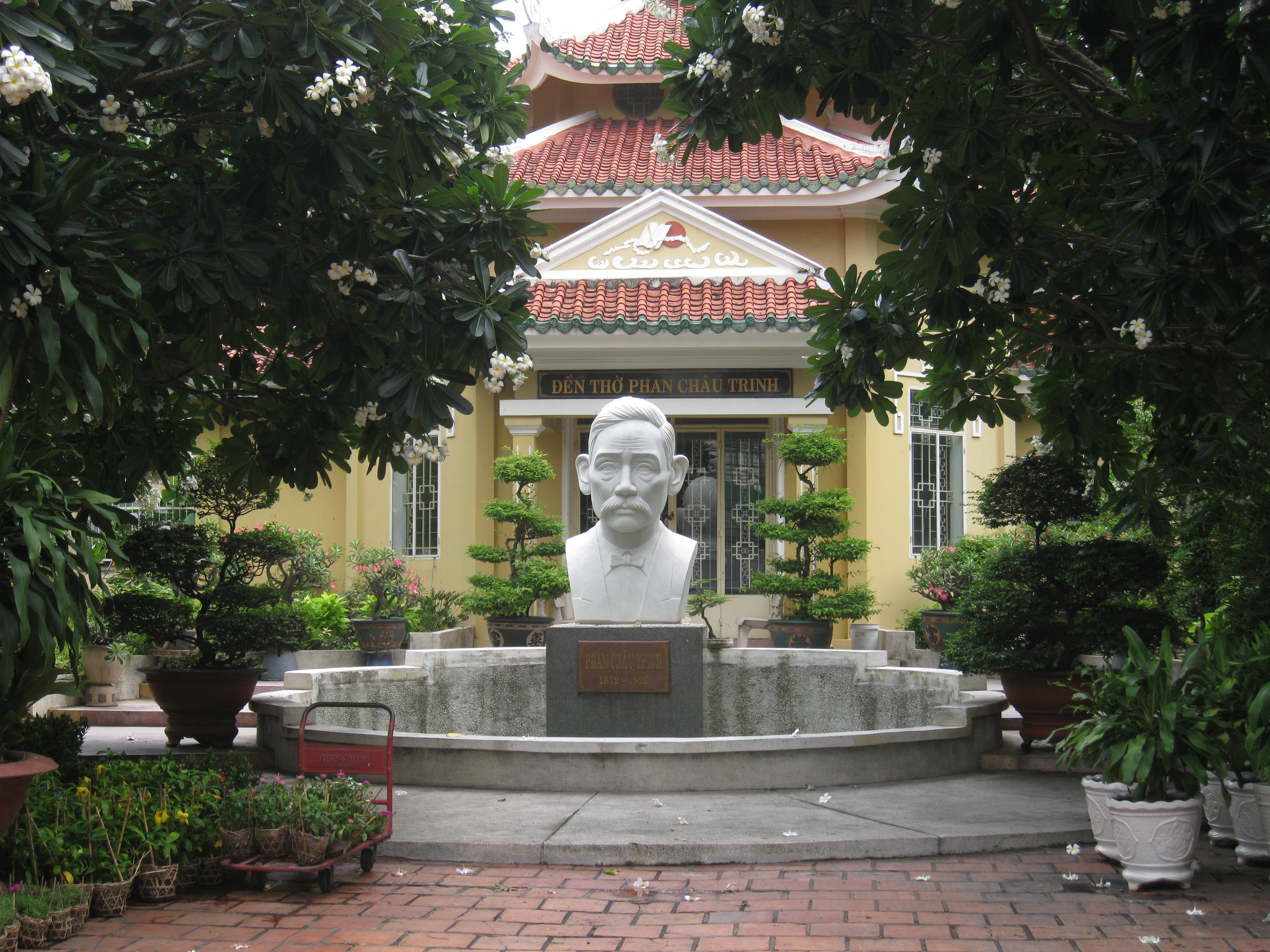
Phan Châu Trinh temple in Tân Bình

In 1930, the Trung Kỳ Brotherhood Association and Phan's family built a temple for him in Đa Kao. In 1933, the old temple was dismantled, instead, a new temple dedicated to Phan was built near his tomb in Tân Bình, Saigon. Nowadays, the Phan Châu Trinh memorial site covers 2,500 square meters, including his temple, his tomb and an artifacts gallery. The site became a national relic since 1994.

Hanoi city also has a road and a ward named after Phan Châu Trinh in its central district – Hoàn Kiếm.

In 2006, Madame Bình – a granddaughter of Phan Châu Trinh – and her associates, formed a Cultural Foundation named after him to "Import, Revive, Initiate, Preserve & Spread of quintessential cultural values to contribute to the renewal of Vietnamese culture in the 21st century".

Most cities in Vietnam have named major streets after him.
