= Nguyễn Quyền =

Vietnamese revolutionary activist

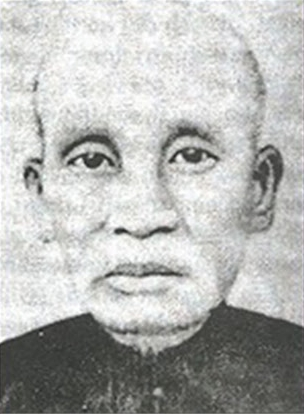
Portrait of Nguyễn Quyền

Nguyễn Quyền (1869–1941) was a Vietnamese scholar-gentry anti-colonial revolutionary activist who advocated independence from French colonial rule. He was a contemporary of Phan Bội Châu and Phan Chu Trinh, and one of Tonkin Free School's (Dong Kinh Nghia Thuc) founders.

Quyền was born in Thượng Trì (or Đìa Village), Thượng Mão, Thuận Thành, Bắc Ninh Province. He was the principal of the Dong Kinh Nghia Thuc School in 1907.

Quyền gained the rank of tu tai in the regional imperial examinations and as a result found himself appointed the huan dao (education officer) of Lạng Sơn prefecture. As a result, he was often known as Huan Quyen.

Quyền was not the first choice for the role. The regional authority in the area was Vi Van Ly, a seventy-year-old descendant of a Chinese immigrant family that had inherited authority in the area due to its bestowal to them by the Nguyễn dynasty. Ly had requested a huan dao via the French resident, but since the highlands area had a poor record in academic performance, there were very few students preparing for exams, so Quyền was appointed to the post from out of district since nobody else was available.

As it was, there was a lack of interest in education in the area, so Quyền had very few duties to fulfil. Instead, he spent most of his time reading books. Since Lạng Sơn was near the Chinese border, Quyền quickly came across Chinese translations of European literature and the writings of Kang Youwei and Liang Chi Chao. Later in his life, he reflected on his time in Lạng Sơn and recalled the excitement he derived rom reading the Chung-kuo hun and Ch'un chi chuan chieh lun, often going without sleep or food to continue reading.

The more I read the more I become aware that the things we studied, our examination system, were wrong – indeed the real reasons for our having lost our country. From that point on I was determined to seize upon our country's literature and on modern learning to awaken our citizenry.

As a result, Quyền advocated the modernisation of Vietnam's education system. In approximately 1903 or 1904, Quyền met Tang Bat Ho, who had recently returned from his travels abroad and talked extensively about the modernisation of Japan. In 1904 he met with Phan Bội Châu, but Quyền had little in common with Chau's ideology of using violence to achieve independence. Quyền went on the work with Lương Văn Can and Le Dai in setting up the Dong Kinh Thuc Nghia, which sought to strengthen the Vietnamese people and thereby the likelihood of independence through the training of a new, more modern generation of scholars.

In 1908, Quyền was arrested in a general crackdown by French authorities and sent to jail on Côn Lôn island.
