= Indochinese alcohol monopoly =

The Indochinese alcohol monopoly was one of French Indochina's defining institutions. Through a favorable combination of advances pioneered by Albert Calmette, development of the Société Française Des Distilleries de l'Indochine (SFDIC) by Auguste Raphaël Fontaine, and then-Governor General Paul Doumer's economic development plan in the 1890s, the French succeeded in displacing local Chinese entrepreneurs. This led to the establishment of a state alcohol monopoly in 1897.^{:5-7} By subverting native production networks and imposing strict controls on alcohol sales and production, the colonial state transformed the alcohol regime into an integral source of revenue for Indochina's economic development.^{:2}

Although French administrators intended to generate revenue by taxing alcohol across Indochina, the rudimentary transportation network implied that the monopoly and its associated means for repression, were confined to Indochina's lowland areas, mainly Tonkin and northern Annam.^{:95-96} More importantly, however, recent revisionist accounts tracing the flows of revenue conversely reveal that it only benefited select French entrepreneurs.^{:147} Instead, it enabled the colonial state to consolidate its control of the Vietnamese populace by penetrating deeper into the countryside.^{:151-155} Following partial reforms of the alcohol regime in Tonkin and northern Annam in 1933, led by journalist and politician Phạm Quỳnh, the demise of the alcohol monopoly coincided with the end of the colonial regime in 1945.

== Origins of the monopoly ==
=== Revenue farms ===
Owing to the dominance of ethnic Chinese merchants in pre-colonial Vietnam and the nascent colonial state apparatus, the French were initially compelled to devise co-dependent arrangements with these ethnic Chinese entrepreneurs.^{:10} These were typified by a plethora of tax farms engaging in the production of commodities such as opium and alcohol in a bid to generate the much-needed revenue to fund the colonial project.^{:2} Akin to the Indochinese alcohol monopoly, as the next section reveals, these early revenue farms necessitated an extensive, and therefore costly, police force to impede the production of contraband alcohol.^{:18-19} The monetary demands of the police force limited the profitability of this arrangement for the ethnic Chinese merchants. This meant that they began withdrawing from the alcohol market in the 1880s. This ultimately paved the way for the French to capitalize on this lucrative source of revenue.^{:1497}

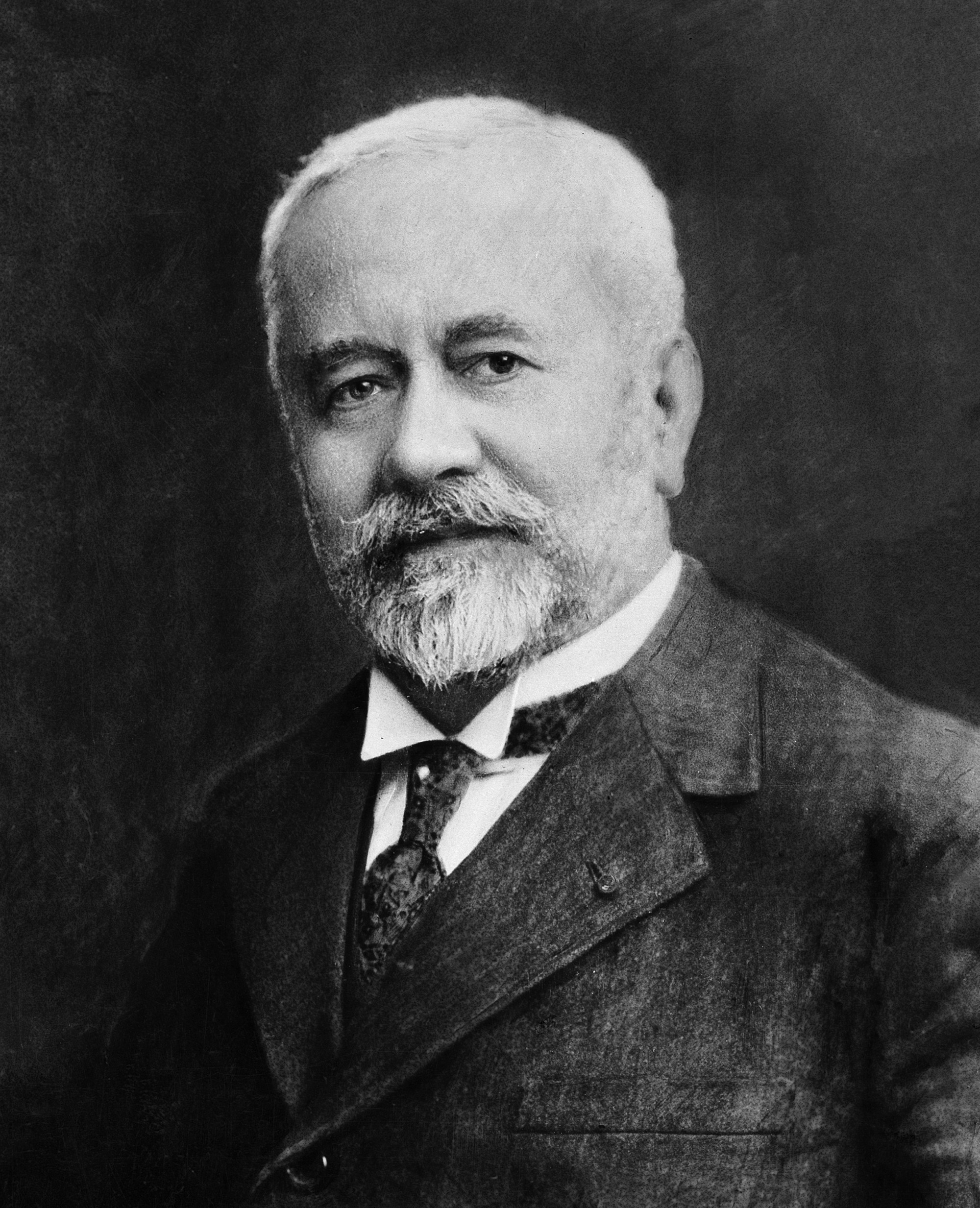
Albert Calmette

=== The convergence of Albert Calmette and the SFDIC ===
In the 1880s, the convergence of scientific advances by bacteriologist Albert Calmette and (then) Governor General Paul Doumer's economic development plan in the early 1890s catalyzed the birth of colonial conglomerates, enabling the development of an alcohol monopoly.

==== Albert Calmette ====
Main page: Albert Calmette

Albert Calmette had observed that the Chinese had previously monopolized the production of rice liquor because of their control over the production of a “Chinese ferment” which lent rice alcohol its characteristic taste. Following his mentor Louis Pasteur's advice to conduct research that had commercial applications, Calmette devoted a substantial portion of his short stint at the Pasteur Institute in Saigon to identifying and replicating this fermenting agent.^{:33} ^{:18-19} Drawing on his mentor's research on wine, Calmette speculated that this crucial ingredient was present in the husk of rice grains.^{:33} Not only was he successful in isolating this microbe, he was also able to double its yield, thereby enabling the industrialization and monopolization of the production of rice alcohol.^{:18-19}

==== The SFDIC & the birth of the monopoly ====
Concurrently, Auguste Raphaël Fontaine, an ambitious young entrepreneur, recently secured a monopoly for the production and sale of alcohol in Hanoi. He had successfully constructed a large modern distillery in the city, and this would eventually form the Société Française des Distilleries de l'Indochine (SFDIC).^{:1508-1509} Galvanized by the desire to displace the ethnic Chinese merchants and acquire the substantial revenues, Fontaine's SFDIC successfully lobbied Calmette for exclusive use of his distillation technique.^{:580} The duo then encouraged the newly elected Governor General Paul Doumer, who had similarly earmarked alcohol (in addition to opium and salt) in his plan for generating a sustainable fiscal foundation for the colony, to grant Fontaine's SFDIC a monopoly on the manufacture of alcohol.^{:580}

== Political economy of the monopoly ==
As Fontaine's factories began producing bottles of tasteless rice alcohol retailing at exorbitantly high prices in the late 1890s, the alcohol regime became increasingly embedded within Indochina's economic and political fabric.^{:68}

=== Economic imperatives ===
The alcohol monopoly, like the opium and salt monopolies, was one of three “beasts of burden” cited by Paul Doumer as a stable taxation systems essential to maintaining the fiscal health of the regime, and, more importantly, to fund Indochina's economic development.^{:2} Echoing the colonial state's justification, earlier scholarship has simply assumed the monopoly's inherent profitability, estimating that these monopolies represented over 75% of the general budget.^{:26} However, recent scholarship has problematized this oft-held assumption.^{:133-157} Colonial historian of Vietnam Gerard Sasges argued that only the earlier revenue farms developed in cooperation with Chinese entrepreneurs were guided by a broader objective of raising revenue.^{:146-147} The alcohol monopoly that began in 1897 was instead guided by political objectives. Moreover, the monopoly generated little net revenue as the bulk of its revenue was siphoned of by Fontaine's SFDIC and used by the Department of Customs and Monopolies to enforce the monopoly, instead of financing the colonial development project as emphasized in the earlier scholarship. As the subsequent section details, Sasges emphasizes that the alcohol monopoly was central to consolidating state power since the collection of taxes enabled the French to penetrate deeper into the Vietnamese countryside.^{:143}

=== Repression ===
Paralleling the tax farms administered by the ethnic Chinese merchants in the late 1860s, the alcohol monopoly was similarly dependent on repressive practices of control and surveillance undertaken by the agents from the largest civilian state entity: the Department of Customs and Monopolies. Mainstream political histories emphasize the intrusive and violent systems of control that underpinned the monopoly.^{:72} ^{:66} These scholars collectively reveal that Customs agents from the Department of Customs and Monopolies would conduct surprise visits, ransacking households in search for evidence of contraband distilling since this undermined the profitability of the regime for Fontaine and his shareholders.^{:72} ^{:66}

=== Everyday resistance ===
Conversely, the recent socio-political histories spotlighting the views of ordinary Vietnamese reveal how they effectively challenged this defining institution of the French colonial period, demonstrating instead that colonized communities had (some) agency. Factory alcohol was both four times as expensive and a poor-replica of local rice alcohol since Fontaine's factories began using a poorer quality of rice to remain cost-efficient.^{:583} Hence, villagers were incentivized to continue distilling and distributing in the countryside. Local women, who travelled daily to the markets in the city center to sell local produce and other wares, stealthily transported this illicit alcohol by disguising it in wineskins.^{:140} In addition, villagers also devised other clever strategies to elude Customs agents and prevent them from conducting raids. For example, villagers would take circuitous routes to the headman's home and then realize he had gone fishing.^{:137} Similarly, village leaders also protected fellow villagers from incurring penalties. In one instance, a villager illegally selling alcohol was arrested and her home was accordingly ordered to be sold, but the village authorities evaded this order by cleverly proving that she as one of the village's poorest residents she had no property to her name. However, these clandestine production and distribution networks relied on collaboration not only amongst villagers but also with members of the state, like the military. There existed men who preferred indigenous alcohol for its cheaper price and also wanted to benefit from the lucrative trade. This was, in turn, typified by the arrest of a French commander in 1905 owing to his complicity in alcohol distribution. Hence, a convergence of consumer demand, profitability, close collaboration, and effective distribution methods successfully stymied the realization of an Indochinese alcohol monopoly. This is exemplified by the colonial states 1912 amnesty for contraband offenses, resulting in the co-existence of a licit and illicit alcohol industry.^{:142}

=== Innovative rhetoric ===
Culinary historian Erica Peters' analysis of letters penned by ordinary Vietnamese reveals how villagers skilfully invoked the burgeoning discourse of taste preferences to defend their production of contraband liquor and galvanize partial reforms. In 1911, because of the low levels of consumption of factory alcohol, the colonial state conducted a survey to understand the reasons for the persistence of contraband distilling.^{:591} Since the French conceived of taste as a central component of modern life but were producing a product of poor quality that was unacceptable to majority of the population, villagers cleverly employed this line of reasoning in their responses in order to defend their local production networks while also criticizing the French for not upholding their modernizing principles.^{:570} As a result, in 1912, then Governor General Albert Sarraut pressured SFDIC to opt for rice grains of better quality.^{:594} Peters' account, akin to Sasges', similarly demonstrates the agency of colonized communities, thereby problematizing the mainstream accounts that emphasize absolute colonial domination.

== Reforms and the end of the monopoly ==
While most scholars of the monopoly conclude their account by expressing that the demise of the alcohol regime resulted from the end of the colonial regime in 1945, it is worth noting that reforms had been introduced more than decade earlier. In 1933, Phạm Quỳnh, a skilled journalist, translator, and politician who is often branded as a traitor, lobbied the then Governor General to dismantle the state-sponsored monopoly on the production of alcohol in Tonkin. Initially disparaging the regime's repressive practices, he subsequently bolstered his claims by arguing that the growing discontent amongst local Vietnamese would inadvertently engender support for their communist rivals.^{:18} Convinced, the SFDIC announced that it would allow a proportion of local distilleries to operate in tandem with the SFDIC.^{:19} While the administrations laws still enabled Fontaine's SPDIC to dominate the alcohol market, this partial reform suggests that the monopoly was in decline prior to 1945.
