= Huỳnh Thúc Kháng =

Vietnamese revolutionary (1876–1947)

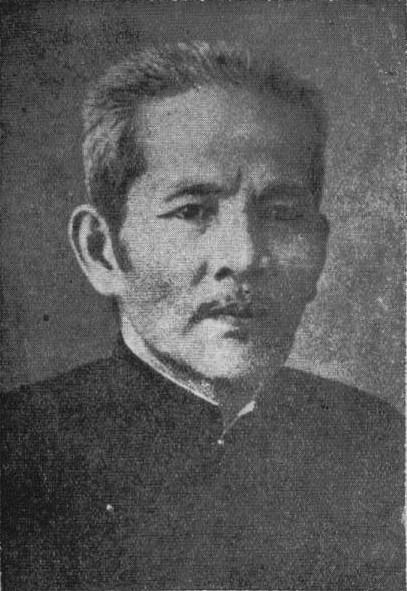

Acting President & Chairman of government of the Democratic Republic of Vietnam
- In office 29 May 1946 – 21 October 1946 ex officio Acting Prime Minister
- Deputised for: Hồ Chí Minh

2nd Minister of Home Affairs
- In office 2 March 1946 – 21 April 1947
- Preceded by: Võ Nguyên Giáp
- Succeeded by: Phan Kế Toại (Acting)

1st President of the House of Representatives of Annam
- In office 1926–1928
- Preceded by: Position established
- Succeeded by: Nguyễn Trác

Personal details
- Born: October 1, 1876 Tiên Phước, Quảng Nam, Vietnam
- Died: 21 April 1947 (aged 70) Nghĩa Hành, Quảng Ngãi, Democratic Republic of Vietnam
- Resting place: Thiên Ấn mountain, Trương Quang Trọng ward, Quảng Ngãi
- Party: Independent
- Awards: Gold Star Order

Huỳnh Thúc Kháng (chữ Hán: 黃叔沆; 1 October 1876 – 21 April 1947), courtesy name Giới Sanh, pen name Mính Viên (also written as Minh Viên), also known as Cụ Huỳnh (lit: 'Great-grandfather' Huỳnh), was a Vietnamese anti-colonial activist, statesman and journalist, most notably serving as Acting President of Vietnam and President of the Annamese House of Representatives.

He was born in Tiên Phước District in Quảng Nam Province, the same district from which Phan Châu Trinh hailed. Huỳnh went on to top the imperial examinations in 1900. Along with Phan Châu Trinh and Trần Quý Cáp, Huỳnh led the Duy Tân movement, for which he was imprisoned in Côn Đảo island by the French colonial authority from 1908 to 1919. He was elected to the House of Representatives of the French protectorate of Annam and served as its President from 1926 to 1928. In 1927, he founded the Huế-based Tiếng Dân newspaper, which gained prominence among the Vietnamese intelligentsia at the time but was shut down by the colonial authority in 1943.

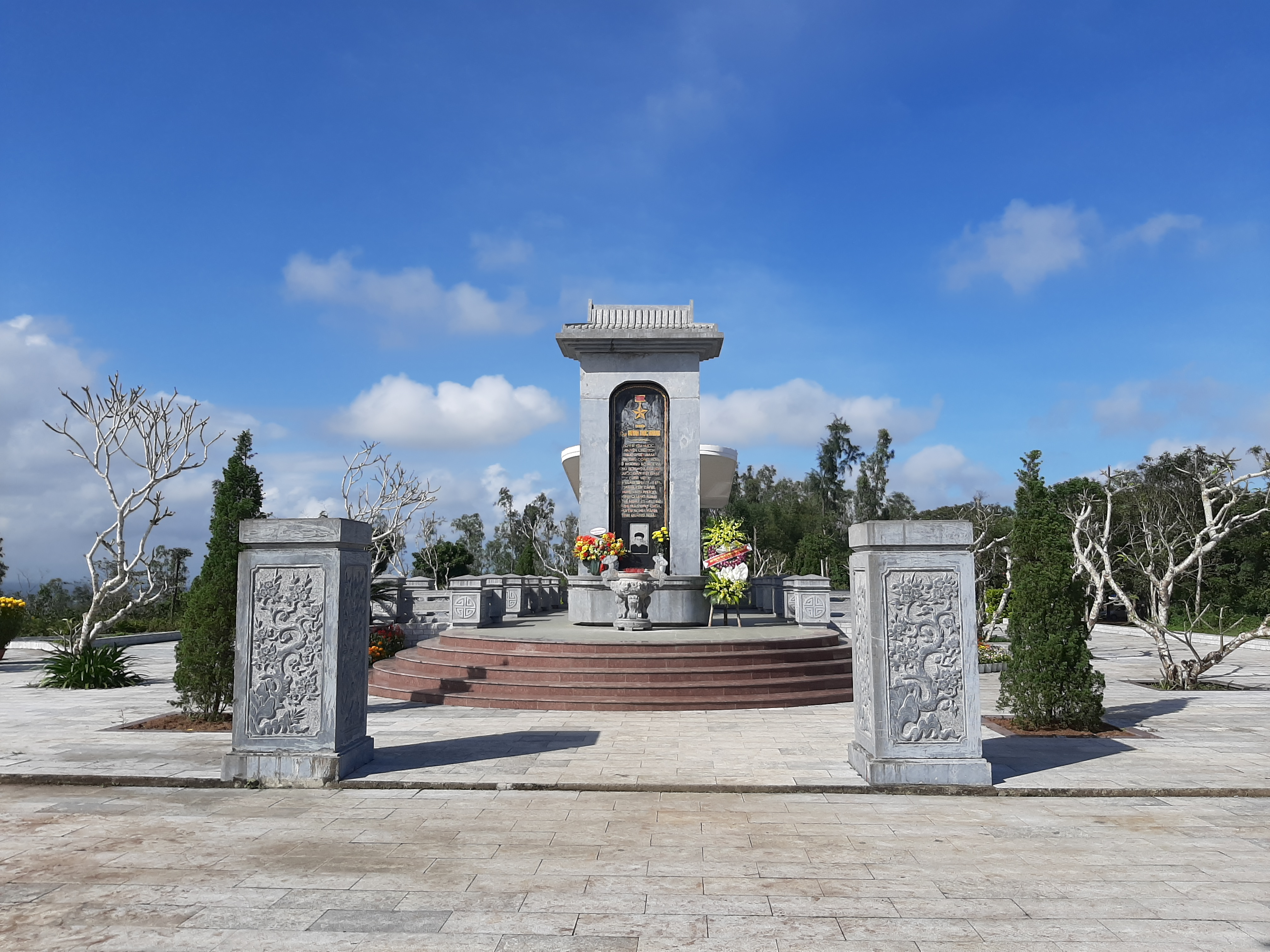
Huỳnh Thúc Kháng tomb on Thiên Ấn mountain

Following the August Revolution, he participated in the Việt Minh-led coalition government as an independent and was appointed Minister of Home Affairs on 2 March 1946. From 31 May to 21 October 1946, he was the Acting President of the Democratic Republic of Vietnam (and ex officio Acting Prime Minister) while Hồ Chí Minh was negotiating in France. In 1946, Huỳnh came back to Quảng Ngãi to lead the fight against the French in the 5th Interzone. Though he died on 21 April 1947 under suspicious circumstances, it was most possibly from a fatal illness he had contracted during his time there and was buried atop the Thiên Ấn mountain, a prominent landmark of Quảng Ngãi.

== Works ==
- Thi tù tùng thoại (The collection of Poems in Prison) a collection of poems composed by Huỳnh Thúc Kháng and his comrades in Côn Đảo prison between 1908 and 1921, first published by Tiếng Dân newspaper in 1939.
- Phan Tây Hồ tiên sinh lịch sử (The history of sensei Phan Tây Hồ) published in 1959 by Anh Minh publisher.

== Legacy and memory ==
Most cities in modern Vietnam have named major streets after him. In 2013, he was posthumously awarded the Gold Star Order, the highest honor of Vietnam.
