= Nguyễn Đắc Xuân =

Vietnamese historian and scholar

Nguyen Dac Xuan (born 1937 in Thừa Thiên-Huế, Vietnam) is a Vietnamese novelist and researcher of Huế culture. He is best known for his poetry, books, and research on the culture and history of the Nguyen dynasty and Ancient Hue.

== Biography ==
Nguyen Dac Xuan was born on 15 July 1937 in Huế, Central Vietnam. He spent his childhood in Dalat with his mother. From 1954 to 1966, he studied in Da Nang, Quang Ngai and Huế. In his first years at secondary school, he began to write poetry. His first publication was in 1959. In 1963, Nguyen became a member of Hue Buddhist student group. Since then, he joined in anti-war Movements in the Southern urban area of Vietnam. From 1964 to 1966, he wrote peace poetry together with contemporary musician Pham Duy and Zen master Thich Nhat Hanh. In 1966, after finishing his study in Sinology from the University of Pedagogical, he continued to join in the activities against the war. He lived in pagodas and later escaped to Thua Thien Hue Base. During this period, he continued to write poetry, articles to call the youths in urban area in 1974, and attended the International Student Festival in Budapest. In 1975, following the ending of war, the restoration of peace and reunification of Vietnam, he continued to write poetry and became a member of Vietnam Writers' Association. In 1989, he was elected the General Secretary of Literature and Art Association in Hue. In 1990, he became the Vice Chief Editor of Song Huong (Perfume River) Magazine. In 1993, he worked for Lao Dong (Labour) Newspaper. In 1994, he became the Chief of Lao Dong Representative Office in the Central and Highland Vietnam. In 1998, he retired at the age of 61.

Nguyen conducted research on the culture and history of the Nguyen dynasty and ancient Huế. He had spent time in France and US to search for documents on the culture and history of Vietnam. He had more than 50 publications and attended tens of Conferences on the Nguyen Dynasty and Ancient Hue. In 2007, He presented the subject "Peace Music and Poetry Movement during the period 1964–1966 in Sounthern Vietnam" at the invitation of William Joiner Center. His main contributions to Hue are noted as followings:

1. Clarification on the exile of King Ham Nghi, Thanh Thai, Duy Tan, Bao Dai in abroad;
2. Writings on Ho Chi Minh's childhood in Huế;
3. Discovery on the vestiges of Dan Duong Palace and Emperor Quang Trung's mausoleum;
4. Decoding some mysteries of the Nguyen dynasty and ancient Huế;
5. Building a new study – the study of the Huế;
6. Collecting books and documents on the Huế dynasty and ancient Huế.

== Works ==
1. Hương Giang stories. Huế: NXB Sông Hương. 1986.
2. The mysteries of former Duy Tân Emperor. 1987.
3. The tale of the ancient citadel. 1989.
4. The youth of Uncle Ho and Huế, Nxb Trẻ. 1990.
5. The concubines in Nguyễn Court (three volumes) 1989, 1994, 1997.
6. Stories of Nguyễn Lords, Department of Culture and Information of Thừa Thiên. 1991.
7. Senior Royal Courtier Trần Tiễn Thành. 1992.
8. Finding the tomb of Emperor Quang Trung. Hà Nội: Nxb Viện Sử Học Việt Nam. 1992.
9. Guide to the citadel. Nxb Thuận Hoá. 1990.
10. Histoire d’amour des dames dans le Palais des Nguyen. Nxb The Gioi. 1993.
11. Ancient Huế, mysteries and discoveries. 1994.
12. Story of the three emperors Dục Đức Thành Thái Duy Tân. 1995.
13. Nine reigns of the Lord, and thirteen reigns of Nguyễn Emperors. 1997.
14. Princes, Seigneurs et Empereurs des Nguyên. The Gioi. 1996.
15. Senior Hoàng Hương Sơn. Nxb Thuận Hoá. 1997.
16. Culture of the ancient citadel. Nxb Thuân Hoá. 1997.
17. Four hundred years of Thiên Mụ Pagoda. 1998.
18. Love stories and love poems of Huế. 1998.
19. "The Famous" Nguyễn Hiễn Dĩnh, who are you? Houston, USA: Anh Trần Xuất bản. 1998.
20. One hundred years of Đông Ba market. 1999.
21. One hundred years of Sàigòn Morin Huế Hotel.
22. Sàigòn Morin Hotel, Huế. 2000.
23. Q & A on Nguyễn Court and Ancient Huế, (6 volumes). TP HCM: Nxb Trẻ. 2000.
24. Searching for ancient Huế on a trip to France. 2000.
25. Stories of Nguyễn’s courtiers. 2001.
26. Knowledge on Nguyễn court and ancient Huế, (4 volumes). 2002.
27. Trịnh Công Sơn, A time like that. 2003.
28. Traces of Uncle Ho’s youth in Huế. Nxb Văn Học. 2003.
29. Festivals and lunar New Year celebration in Nguyễn Court. 2004.
30. The great Trương Quốc Dụng. 2006.
31. The delightful returning day of song composer Phạm Duy. 2006.
32. Finding the traces of Đan Dương Palace – Tom of Emperor Quang Trung. Huế: Nxb Thuận Hóa. 2007.
33. A dialogue with concubine "thứ phi" Mộng Điệp of the former emperor Bảo Đại. 2008.
34. The funeral scarf by Nhã Ca Trần Thị Thu Vân. Houston: Nxb Đông Dương Thời Báo. 2008.
35. 700 years of Thuận Hóa Phú Xuân Huế. Nxb Trẻ. 2009.
36. In memory of song composer Phạm Thế Mỹ. 2010.
37. Senior Royal Courtier Trần Tiễn Thành. 2010.
38. The branch of conifer in An Hiên garden. 2010.
39. Trịnh Công Sơn, a time like that. 2011.
40. Study of Nguyễn Court and Ancient Huế (Volum I). 2011.
41. Stories of the Ladies in normal life and in Nguyễn’s court. 2011.
42. To memorize forever. Nxb Phụ Nữ. 2011.
43. Study of Nguyễn Court and Ancient Huế (Volum II). 2011.
44. From Phú Xuân to Huế, Biography, (3 Volums). Nxb Trẻ. 2012.
45. One hundred years of delights and sadness of Queen Nam Phương. Nxb Thuận Hóa.
46. Emperor Hàm Nghi- A vietnamese soul in exile. 2013.
47. Queen Lê Ngọc Hân in Huế. 2014.
48. The South with Nguyễn Court and Ancient Huế, Hồng Đức. 2015.
49. The greatest names (Đỉnh Xuất Kỳ Nhân). 2016.
50. Lotus blossom on the return. Thuận Hóa. 2016.
51. Dương Xuân Residence under the Lord Nguyễn’s reign - Đan Dương Palace under Emperor Quang Trung in Huế. Văn hóa Văn Nghệ TP HCM. 2017.
52. Thiền Lâm –the historical pagoda – the largest temple of the inner land. Thuận Hóa. 2017.
