= Tonkin Free School =

School in Hanoi, Vietnam, 1907–1908

The Tonkin Free School (Vietnamese: Đông Kinh Nghĩa Thục, 東京義塾) was a short-lived but historically significant educational institution in Hanoi that aimed to reform Vietnamese society under the French protectorate during the beginning of the 20th century.

== History ==
The school was founded in March 1907, run by Lương Văn Can with the participation of many nationalists, including Phan Bội Châu and Phan Châu Trinh. It stemmed from the movement of the same name, which aimed to modernize Vietnamese society by abandoning Ruism and adopting new ideas from the West and Japan. In particular, it promoted the Vietnamese alphabet script for writing Vietnamese in place of classical Hanese by publishing educational materials and newspapers using these script, as a new vehicle of instruction. The schools offered free courses to anyone who wanted to learn about the modern spirit. The teachers at the school at 59 Hàng Đàn included Phạm Duy Tốn.

The school operated legally for several months before the French authorities closed it down in November. In March 1908, a tax revolt in Annam and an attempted poisoning of French soldiers in Hanoi were blamed on the leaders of the school by the French. Subsequently, all the leaders were arrested and the school's publications were suppressed.

The school aimed at making the Vietnamese ‘modern’. It taught subjects like science, hygiene and French generally at evenings.

== Members ==
- Lương Văn Can
- Đỗ Đức Anh
- Đào Nguyên Phổ
- Phan Tuấn Phong
- Đặng Kinh Luân
- Dương Bá Trạc
- Lê Đại
- Vũ Hoành
- Phan Đình Đối
- Phan Huy Thịnh
- Nguyễn Hữu Cầu
- Hoàng Tăng Bí
- Nguyễn Quyền
- Phạm Duy Tốn
- Nguyễn Văn Vĩnh

== See also ==
- Société d’Enseignement Mutuel du Tonkin
- Đông Du
