= Phan Kế Toại =

Vietnamese politician

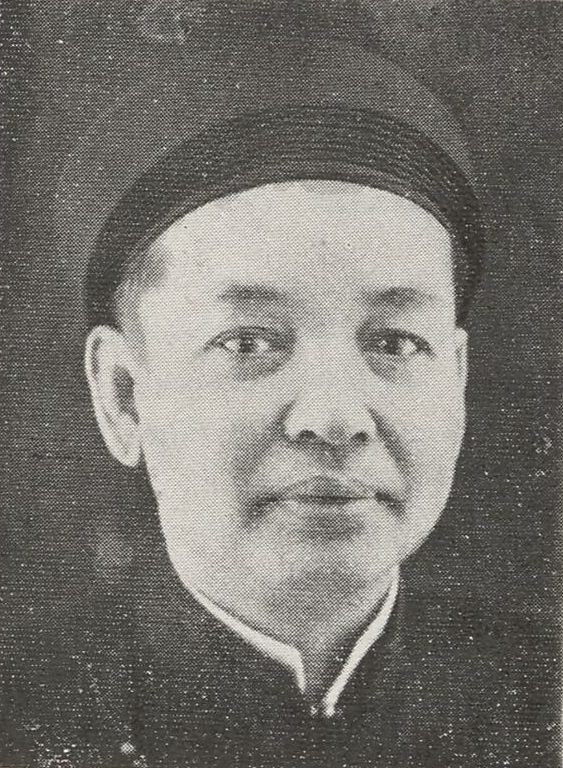

3rd Deputy Prime Minister of Vietnam
- In office September 20, 1955 – June 6, 1973
- Prime Minister: Phạm Văn Đồng
- Preceded by: Phạm Văn Đồng
- Succeeded by: Võ Nguyên Giáp

Personal details
- Born: 1892
- Died: 1973 (aged 80–81)
- Relations: Nguyễn Văn Huyên
- Parent: Phan Kế Tiến
- Education: Colonial School, Paris

Phan Kế Toại was a Vietnamese politician who served as Deputy Prime Minister of Vietnam and Minister of Home Affairs under the prime ministership of Phạm Văn Đồng from September 20, 1955, to June 6, 1973. He also served as Imperial Commissioner of Northern Vietnam.

== Personal life ==
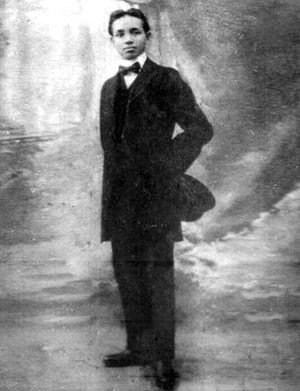
Toai in his youth in France.

He was the third son of Phan Kế Tiến, in 1892, who was scholar and served as Governor of Phúc Yên province. He studied at Colonial School, Paris. He married the elder sister of Nguyễn Văn Huyên. He died in 1973.
