= Nguyễn Văn Vĩnh =

Vietnamese journalist and translator (1882–1936)

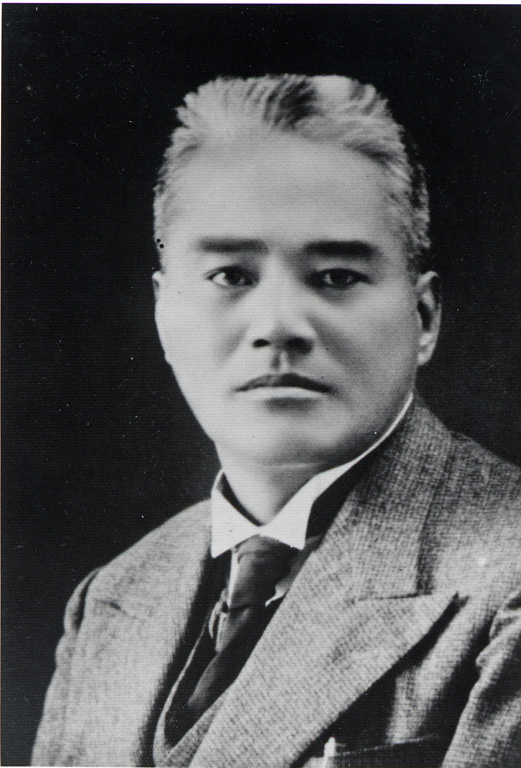
- Born: June 15, 1882; Hà Đông, Tonkin, French Indochina
- Died: May 1, 1936 (aged 53); Seponh, French protectorate of Laos
- Other name: Tân Nam Tử
- Occupations: Journalist, writer, translator
- Children: Nguyễn Nhược Pháp

Nguyễn Văn Vĩnh (1882–1936) was a Vietnamese journalist and translator of Western literature in the early 20th century during the Nguyễn dynasty. Together with François-Henri Schneider he founded the Đông Dương tạp chí (1912) – known as the first successful Vietnamese Quốc ngữ newspaper in Hà Nội.

Nguyễn Văn Vĩnh was born 15 June 1882 in a poor family in Hà Đông province of Tonkin. In 1896, Nguyễn graduated from the French School of Interpreters, and was accepted as an interpreter at the Lào Cai Resident Minister office. One year later, he was transferred to the office of Hải Phòng and Bắc Ninh. During the time in Hải Phòng, he contributed to Courrier d’Hai Phong and Tribune Indochinoise newspapers. In 1906, Nguyễn was transferred to the office of Hà Nội, where he and his companions established Đông Kinh Nghĩa Thục with Lương Văn Can at the headmaster position. In the same year, Nguyễn quit his government job, became a freelance journalist, then the first Vietnamese member of Human Rights League (France).

On 15 May 1913, the first issue of Đông Dương tạp chí was published with Nguyễn as the editor-in-chief along with main contributors Phạm Duy Tốn, Phan Kế Bính, Nguyễn Đỗ Mục, Phạm Quỳnh, Nguyễn Văn Tố, Trần Trọng Kim, and Nguyễn Khắc Hiếu. The paper was technically owned by Schneider, since only a Frenchman could obtain a license to publish a newspaper. Its French sister paper was France-Indochine.

Nguyễn Văn Vĩnh was a non-communist nationalist moderniser who sought to renew the Vietnamese culture by adopting Western ways of life. He rejected the political violence of the Restoration League, arguing in 1913 that the Vietnamese should use the cultural benefits of France to shut out seditious noises, so that the explosions caused by the rebels will not drown out the drums of civilization'. Vĩnh used the Indochina Review to criticize Vietnamese culture in a series of articles entitled 'Examining Our Defects'.

In the 1930s, he worked together with the French and translated numerous Western literary works such as La Fontaine's Fables and Jonathan Swift’s Gulliver’s Travels into Quốc ngữ in an attempt to introduce the Vietnamese to Western culture.

Nguyễn Văn Vĩnh was also credited with devising the original set of rules for the Telex Vietnamese character encoding system.
