= Trần Quý Cáp =

Vietnamese poet

Trần Quý Cáp 陳季恰
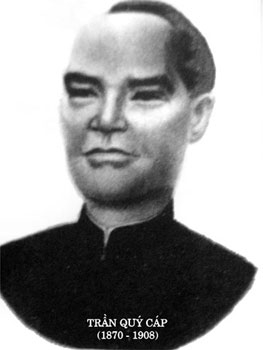
- Born: Trần Nghị; 1870; Quảng Nam, Đại Nam
- Died: 1908; Khánh Hòa, Trung Kỳ
- Other names: Thai Xuyên
- Movement: Duy Tân Movement

Trần Quý Cáp (chữ Hán: 陳季恰, 1870–1908), born Trần Nghị, courtesy name Dã Hàng, Thích Phu, pen name Thai Xuyên, was a Vietnamese notable poet and anti-colonialist. He was one among several leading scholars in the Duy Tân Movement including Phan Chu Trinh, and Huỳnh Thúc Kháng.

In the anti tax-collection case in Trung Kỳ in 1908, he was arrested by the French colonialists and sentenced to death by waist cutting even though the authorities had no evidence.

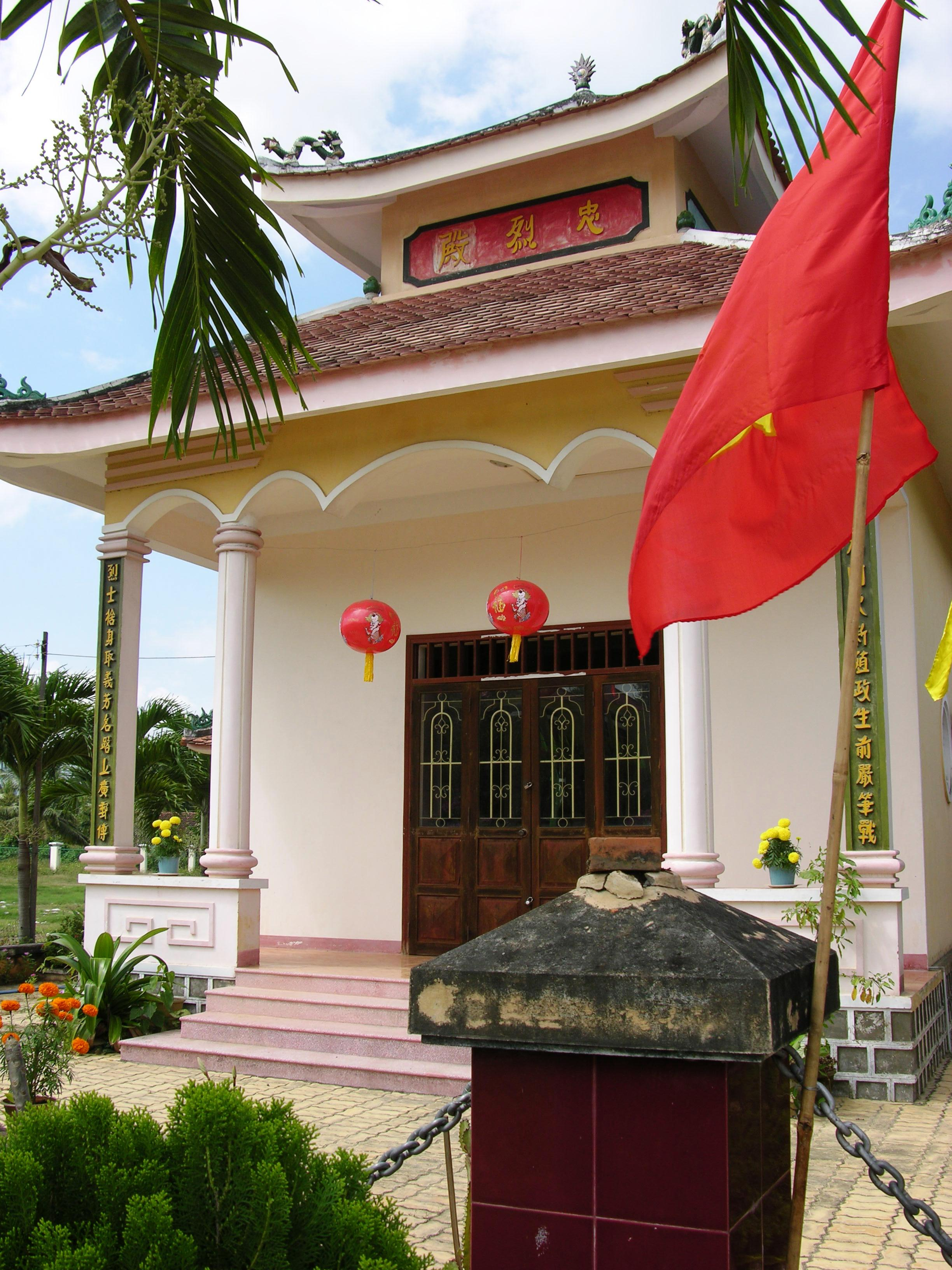
The temple of poet Trần Quý Cáp at Diên Khánh.
