= Nông Cổ Mín Đàm =

Vietnamese newspaper

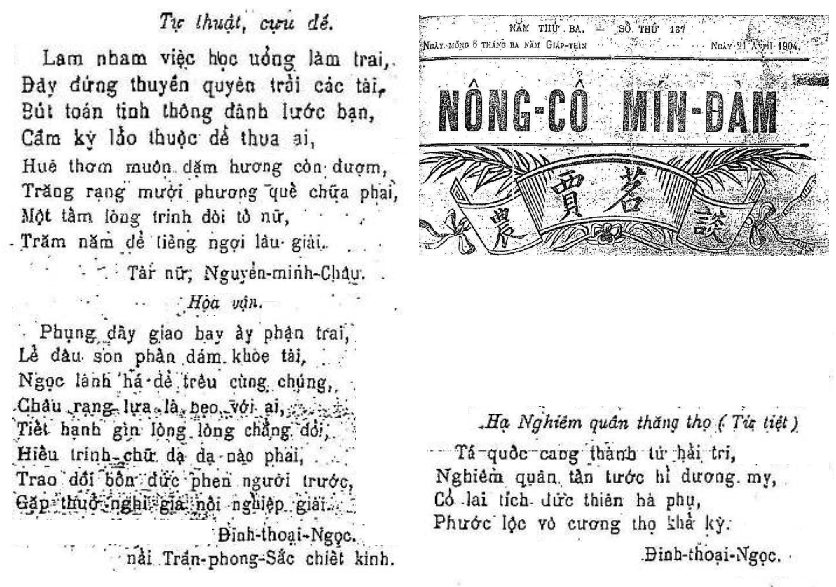
Nông Cổ Mín Đàm issue 137

The Nông Cổ Mín Đàm (1901–1924, fr:Causeries sur L'agriculture et Le commerce, en: Talks on Agriculture and Commerce) was the first Vietnamese economic newspaper published in Saigon. Owned by Paul Canavaggio – a French plantation owner cum salt trader – the newspaper was printed in both Quốc ngữ and Chữ Nho, once a week on Thursday at first, then increased to three issues per week.

== History ==
With the first editor-in-chief Lương Khắc Ninh from 1901 to 1906, then the second – Trần Chánh Chiếu from 1906 to 1908, Nông Cổ Mín Đàm was a forum of the contemporary Vietnamse businessmen to protect the national economic development and interest.

The newspaper also diffused Quốc ngữ via translations of Chinese novels by a team of translators elite in both Quốc ngữ and Chữ Nho such as Nguyễn Chánh Sắc, Trần Phong Sắc, Nguyễn An Khương, Nguyễn An Cư, Đinh Văn Đẩu, Trần Hữu Quang, Huỳnh Trí Phú.
