= House of Representatives (Annam) =

A consultative house of the government of the French protectorate of Annam.

Trung kỳ Nhân dân Đại biểu viện 中圻人民代表院 Chambre des Représentants du Peuple de l'Annam

Type
- Type: Unicameral

History
- Established: February 24, 1926
- Disbanded: May 12, 1945
- Preceded by: Indigenous Consultative Council
- Seats: 33

Meeting place
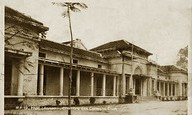
- Huế, Annam, French Indochina

The House of Representatives of the People of Annam (Vietnamese: Trung kỳ Nhân dân Đại biểu viện, Hán-Nôm: 中圻人民代表院, French: Chambre des Représentants du Peuple de l'Annam) was an advisory body for the French Indochinese colonial government in the protectorate of Annam (nowadays Central Vietnam). It was involved with economic, financial and social issues of the protectorate. The chamber was established by a decree on February 24, 1926, of Governor-General of Indochina Alexandre Varenne. The predecessor of the chamber was the Indigenous Consultative Council of Annam (Vietnamese: Hội đồng Tư vấn Bản xứ Trung Kỳ, French: Chambre consultative Indigène l’Annam). The body officially ceased its operation on May 12, 1945, after a decree of dissolution by Emperor Bảo Đại following the Japanese coup d'état against the French colonial authorities in Indochina.

Prominent figures of the Vietnamese independence and anti-colonial movements had been members of the house, most notably Huỳnh Thúc Kháng, who was the President of the House of Representatives (1926-1928) and later became the Acting President of the Democratic Republic of Vietnam.

== Organization ==
There were 33 deputies to the House of Representatives, headed by a president. The constituency is limited to one of these six categories:

1. civil servants
2. university graduates
3. cai tổng (heads of local communes)
4. delegates of local councils selected by the Privy Council
5. mandarins
6. businessmen with high tax bracket

== List of presidents ==
- Huỳnh Thúc Kháng (1926-1928)
- Nguyễn Trác
- Nguyễn Phúc Ưng Bình (1940-1945)

== Seat ==
The former seat of the House of Representatives has been used as administrative offices for the University of Huế.
