= Lục Tỉnh Tân Văn =

Vietnamese newspaper

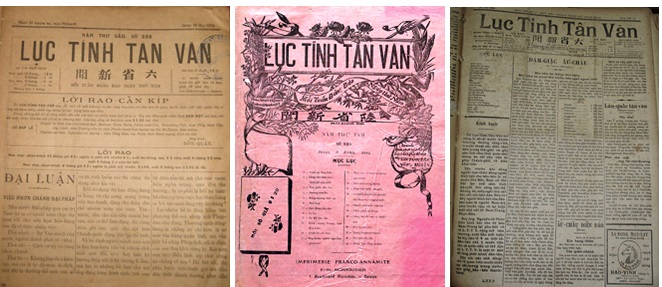
Lục Tỉnh Tân Văn newspaper No. 223, No. 243, No. 320, No. 665

The Lục Tỉnh Tân Văn (1907, lit. 'Six Provinces News'; chữ Hán: 六省新聞) was a Vietnamese newspaper published in Saigon. Although the title was Sino-Vietnamese, the newspaper was one of the first non-Catholic papers to use the Latin quốc ngữ script.

The paper was technically owned by François-Henri Schneider, since only a Frenchman could obtain a license to publish a newspaper, but behind him stood the industrialist Gilbert Trần Chánh Chiếu, in 1908 arrested as a secret backer and organizer of the independence movement.

== Hanoi ==
François-Henri Schneider also was involved with a newspaper in Hanoi, the Đông Dương tạp chí (East Seas Magazine; chữ Hán: 東洋雜誌).
