= Việt Báo Daily News =

Vietnamese-language American newspaper

- Văn Học / Nghệ Thuật (Literature / Arts)
- Type: Daily
- Founder(s): Nhã Ca and Trần Dạ Từ
- Editor-in-chief: Hai Tan Phan (Phan Tấn Hải)
- CEO: Nina Hòa Bình Lê
- Founded: 1992; 34 years ago
- Language: Vietnamese
- City: Garden Grove, California
- Country: United States
- ISSN: 1087-7266
- OCLC number: 34388467
- Website: vietbao.com

Việt Báo Daily News (Vietnamese: Việt Báo, lit. 'Vietnamese Daily') is a Vietnamese-language daily newspaper published in Garden Grove, California, for the Vietnamese-American community. Việt Báo is one of five Vietnamese daily newspapers distributed in Little Saigon.

== History ==
Việt Báo was founded in 1992 by two former South Vietnamese writers, novelist Nhã Ca and poet Trần Dạ Từ. It was originally titled Việt Báo Kinh Tế (Vietnamese Economic News) and based in Westminster, California. It published weekly until 1995, when it began publishing daily. By 2012, it also printed local editions in San Jose, California; Tacoma, Washington; and Houston.

== Writing contest ==
Since May 2000, Việt Báo and the non-profit Việt Báo Foundation have organized an annual writing contest, Writing on America (Viết Về Nước Mỹ), generally for essays about the Vietnamese-American experience. By 2012, the contest had received a total of 17,000 entries, of which 4,380 had been edited and published. Anthologies have been published in English and Vietnamese. The awards ceremony has drawn attendees from across the country.

== See also ==
- Người Việt Daily News
- Viễn Đông Daily News
