= Phạm Duy Khiêm =

- Born: 24 April 1908; Hanoi, French Indochina
- Died: 2 December 1974 (aged 66); Montreuil-le-Henri, France
- Education: Khâgne Lycée Louis-le-Grand 1929 1930
- Alma mater: Ecole Normale Supérieure (1931), Agrégation de grammaire (1935)
- Occupations: writer, critic, teacher, journalist, politician
- Relatives: Phạm Duy Tốn (father); Nguyễn Thị Hòa (mother); Phạm Duy Nhượng (younger brother); Phạm Thị Thuận (sister); Phạm Thị Chinh (sister); Phạm Duy (younger brother)
- Writing career
- Pen name: Nam Kim
- Language: French; Vietnamese
- Period: 1941–1974
- Genres: novel, autobiography
- Notable works: De Hà Nội à La Courtine; Légendes des terres sereines Nam et Sylvie; Ma mère
- Military career
- Allegiance: France
- Branch: French Army
- Service years: 1939–1940
- Conflicts: World War II

Phạm Duy Khiêm (24 April 1908 – 2 December 1974) was a Vietnamese writer, academic and South Vietnam ambassador in France. He was the son of the writer Phạm Duy Tốn, and brother of songwriter Phạm Duy.

== Paris ==
In Paris at the lycée Louis-le-Grand from 1929 his circle included Léopold Sédar Senghor and Georges Pompidou. He won the Prix Louis Barthou of the Académie Française for the autobiographical novel Nam et Sylvie 1942 under the pseudonym Nam Kim, then the Prix Littéraire d'Indochine in 1943 for Légendes des terres sereines He earned his PhD from the University of Toulouse in 1957.

== Ambassador ==
He was briefly ambassador to France for the Ngô Đình Diệm government 1954–1957, but turned down a second appointment as ambassador to UNESCO because of his inability to support Diệm's policies.

== Death ==
He committed suicide on 2 December 1974 at his home in Montreuil-le-Henri, Sarthe. In his youth, he had said "one must justify his existence on this earth" (il faut justifier sa présence sur cette terre).

== Works ==
- Việt Nam văn phạm (with Trần Trọng Kim, Bùi Kỷ, 1941)
- De Hanoi à la Courtine (1941)
- De la Courtine à Vichy (1942)
- Mélanges (1942)
- Légendes des Terres Sereines (1942)
- La Jeune femme de Nam Xuong (1944)
- Nam et Sylvie (1957)
- La place d'un homme (1958)
- Ma mère
