= Hanoi Poison Plot =

1908 failed anti-French plot in Vietnam

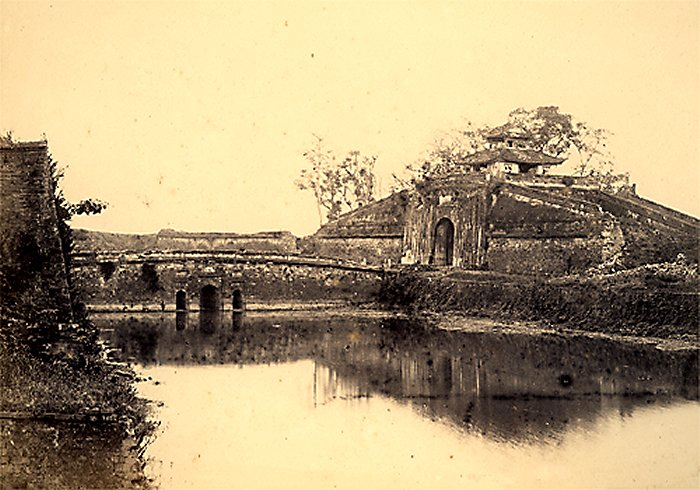
Citadel of Hanoi.

The Poisoning at Hanoi Citadel (Vietnamese: Hà Thành đầu độc; Chữ Hán: 河城投毒) was a poisoning plot which occurred in 1908 when a group of Vietnamese indigenous tirailleurs attempted to poison the entire French colonial army's garrison in the Citadel of Hanoi. The aim of the plot was to neutralize the French garrison and make way for Hoang Hoa Tham's rebel army to capture Hanoi. The plot was disclosed, and then was suppressed by the French.

== Background and poisoning ==
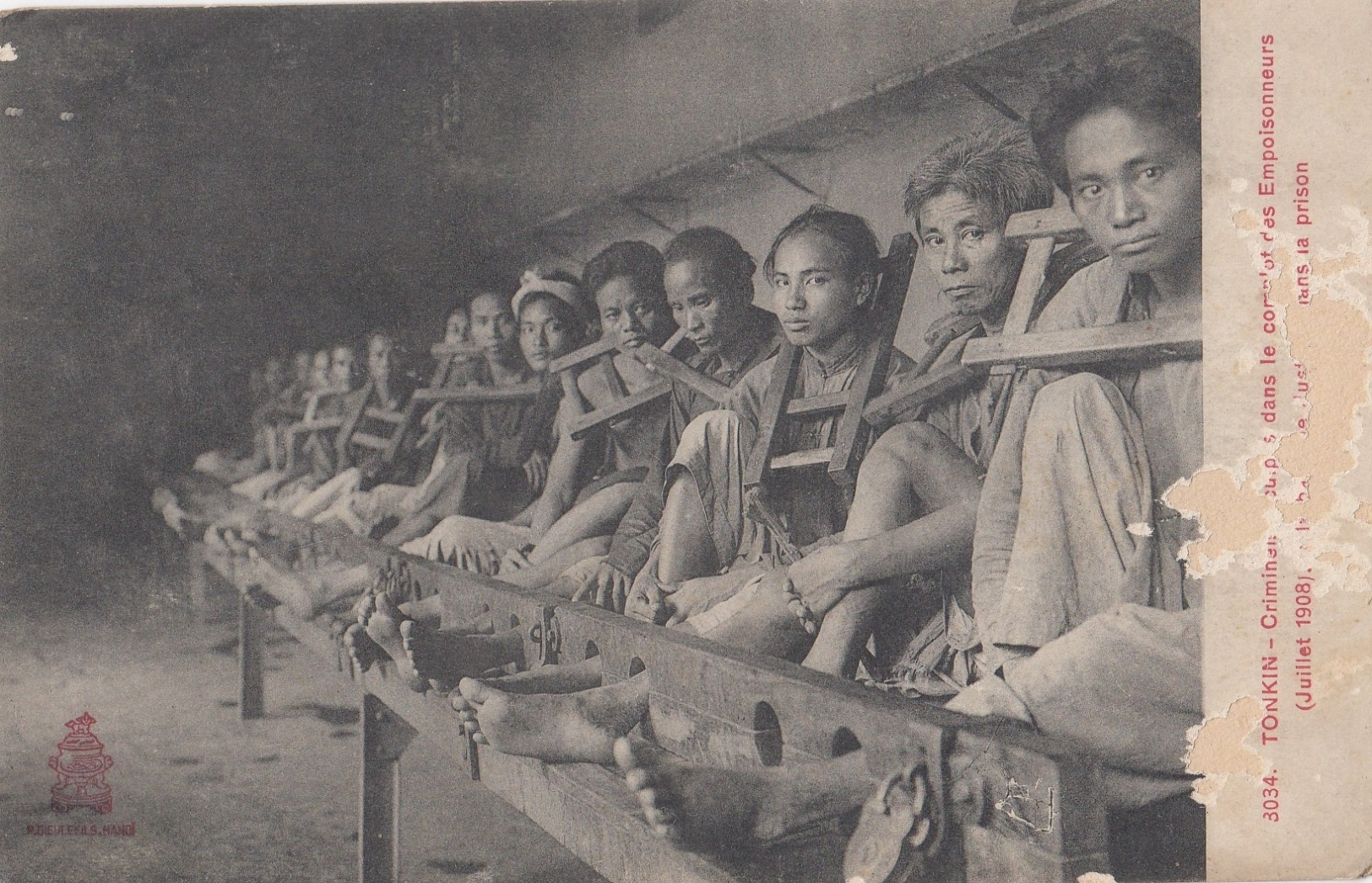
Captured plotters.

In early 1908, Hoang Hoa Tham collaborated with Vietnamese nationalists, including Phan Boi Chau, in organizing a plot to seize Hanoi from the French. Vietnamese cooks were to neutralize the French garrison in Hanoi by poisoning their dinner foods; at the same time, Vietnamese soldiers (Grade Indochinois) would attack and prevent French troops at Don Thuy, Son Tay, and Bac Ninh from coming to the aid of the Citadel of Hanoi; and Hoang Hoa Tham would wait outside the citadel and launch an attack on Gia Lam when the signal arrived from the inside.

The plan was executed on the evening of 27 June 1908, when the group of Vietnamese cooks managed to mix datura poison with food they had prepared for a party. The poison immediately knocked out nearly 200 French troops but did not kill them. Moreover, one of the cooks had felt guilty and had gone to a church for confession, the French priest (Fr. Dronet Ân) then reported this to government officials; the French general-in-charge in Hanoi immediately proclaimed martial law and ordered the arrest of plot leaders and plotters. Outside the citadel, Hoang Hoa Tham did not receive the signal he was expecting, realized the plot had failed and withdrew all his troops.

== Aftermath ==
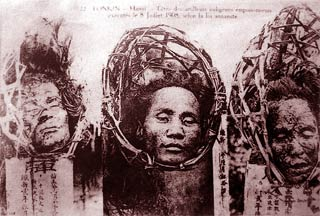
Heads of executed plotters displayed in public

In quick response to the plot, the French executed by guillotine 13 plotters. On 8 July 1908, another 24 death sentences were announced and the remaining rebels were sentenced to life or exiled. Severely repressive actions were launched against the Vietnamese activists, and hundreds of them, including Phan Châu Trinh, were sent to Con Dao prison. The French also accused Phan Boi Chau of the plot, forcing him to flee to Japan; this abortive plot later became one of many incidents that eventually landed Chau in French prison in 1914. On the other hand, the French began hunting Hoang Hoa Tham. They attacked and defeated Tham in 11 major battles from 29 January through 11 November 1909 and then surrounded him in Yen The, though Tham fled and kept on fighting until he was assassinated in 1913.

== Notes ==
=== References ===
- Chapuis, Oscar (2000). The last emperors of Vietnam: from Tu Duc to Bao Dai. Greenwood Publishing Group. ISBN 0-313-31170-6.
- Priestley, Herbert Ingram (1967). France Overseas: Study of Modern Imperialism. Routledge. ISBN 0-7146-1024-0.
- Thomas, Martin (2005). The French empire between the wars: imperialism, politics and society. Manchester University Press. ISBN 0-7190-6518-6.
- Largo, V. (2002). Vietnam: Current Issues and Historical Background. Nova Publishers. ISBN 1-59033-368-3.
- Marr, David G. (1971). Vietnamese Anticolonialism, 1885-1925. University of California Press. ISBN 0-520-01813-3.
- Bradley, Mark; Gaddis, John Lewis (2000). Imagining Vietnam and America: The Making of Postcolonial Vietnam, 1919-1950. UNC Press. ISBN 0-8078-4861-1.
- Schulzinger, Robert D. (1999). A Time for War: The United States and Vietnam, 1941-1975. Oxford University Press US. ISBN 0-19-512501-0.
