= Nam Phong tạp chí =

Vietnamese newspaper

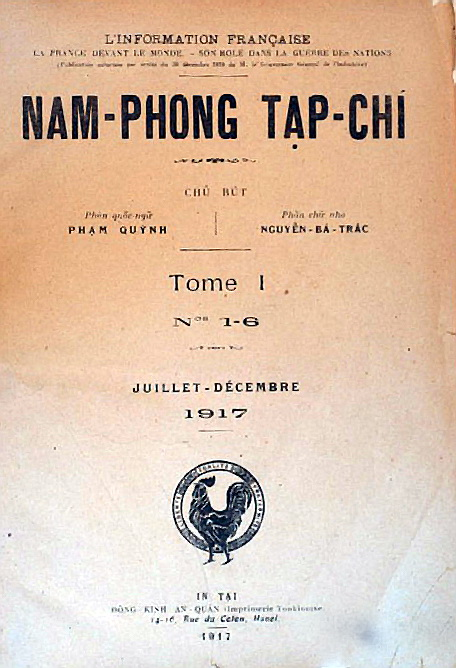
A cover of the Nam Phong Tạp chí

The Nam Phong tạp chí (lit. 'Journal of Southern Wind'; 1917–1934), was a Vietnamese quốc ngữ newspaper in Hanoi founded by Louis Marty (chief of General Security bureau of Indochina) and Phạm Quỳnh, with the aim was absorbing both European and Asian cultures, and keeping balance between Tân học (Western studies, French literary) and Cựu học (Eastern studies, Chinese literary).

Phạm Quỳnh held the position of editor-in-chief cum manager of Quốc ngữ section. Nguyễn Bá Trác was the manager of Chữ Nho section. From 1917 to 1922, the editorial board consisted of Phạm Quỳnh, Nguyễn Bá Trác, Dương Bá Trạc, Nguyễn Bá Học, Nguyễn Hữu Tiến, Phan Khôi, Tản Đà, Hoàng Tích Chu, and Nguyễn Mạnh Bổng.
