= Hội Trí Tri =

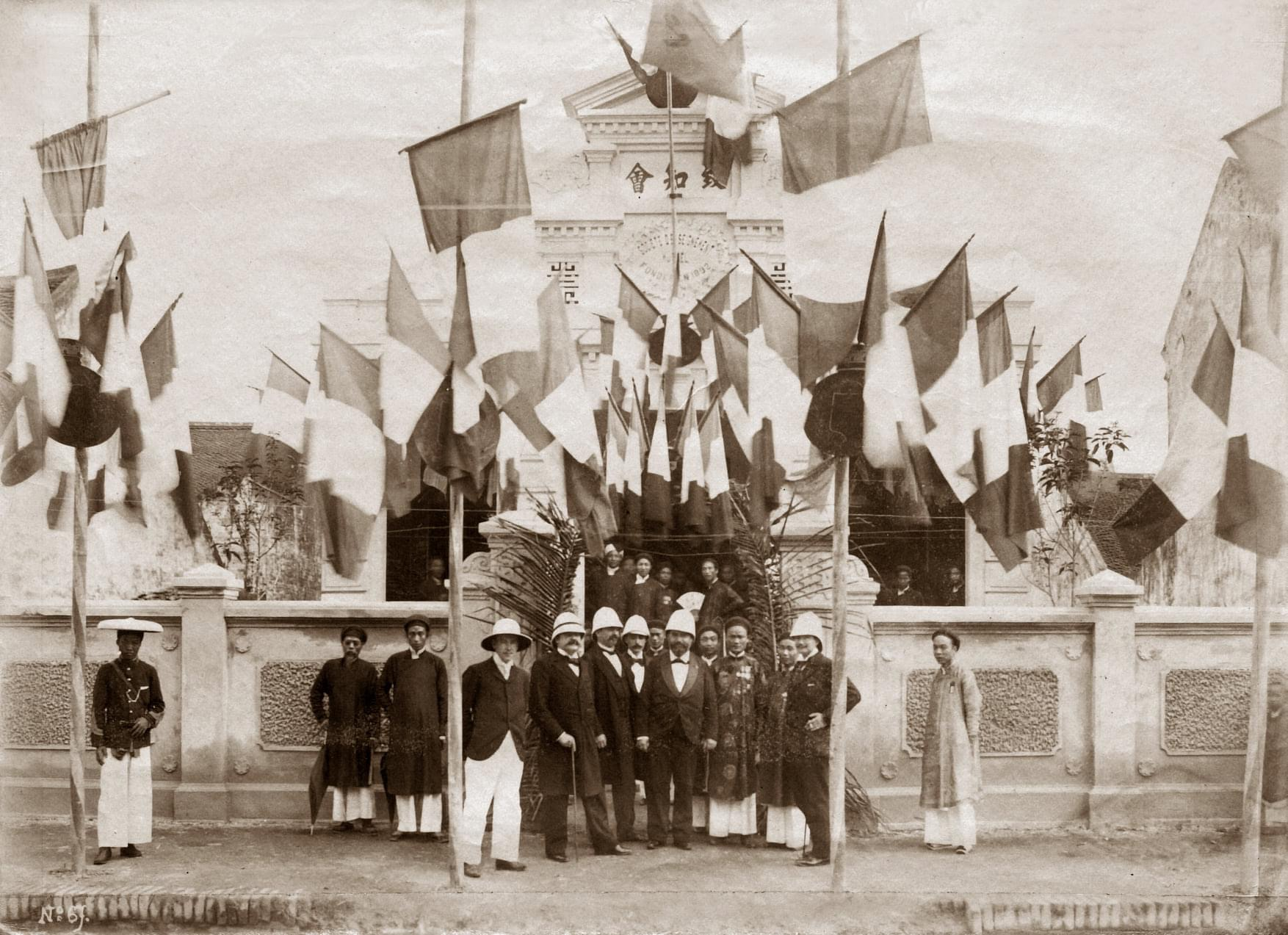
The opening of the Hội Trí Tri by the Governor-General of French Indochina Jean-Marie de Lanessan on 1 April 1892.

The Hội Trí Tri (Vietnamese pronunciation: [hoj˧˨ʔ t͡ɕi˧˦ t͡ɕi˧˧]; 會致知) or the Société d’Enseignement Mutuel du Tonkin (French pronunciation: [sɔsjete dɑ̃sɛɲmɑ̃ mytɥɛl dy tɔ̃kɛ̃]; 1892–1946) was an educational society in French colonial Tonkin. It was part of the modernist movement. The Association for Mutual Education was behind the short-lived Tonkin Free School (1907–1908) at 59 Hàng Đàn where Phạm Duy Tốn was one of the teachers. The chairman was Nguyễn Văn Tố.
