= Phạm Duy Tốn =

Vietnamese writer

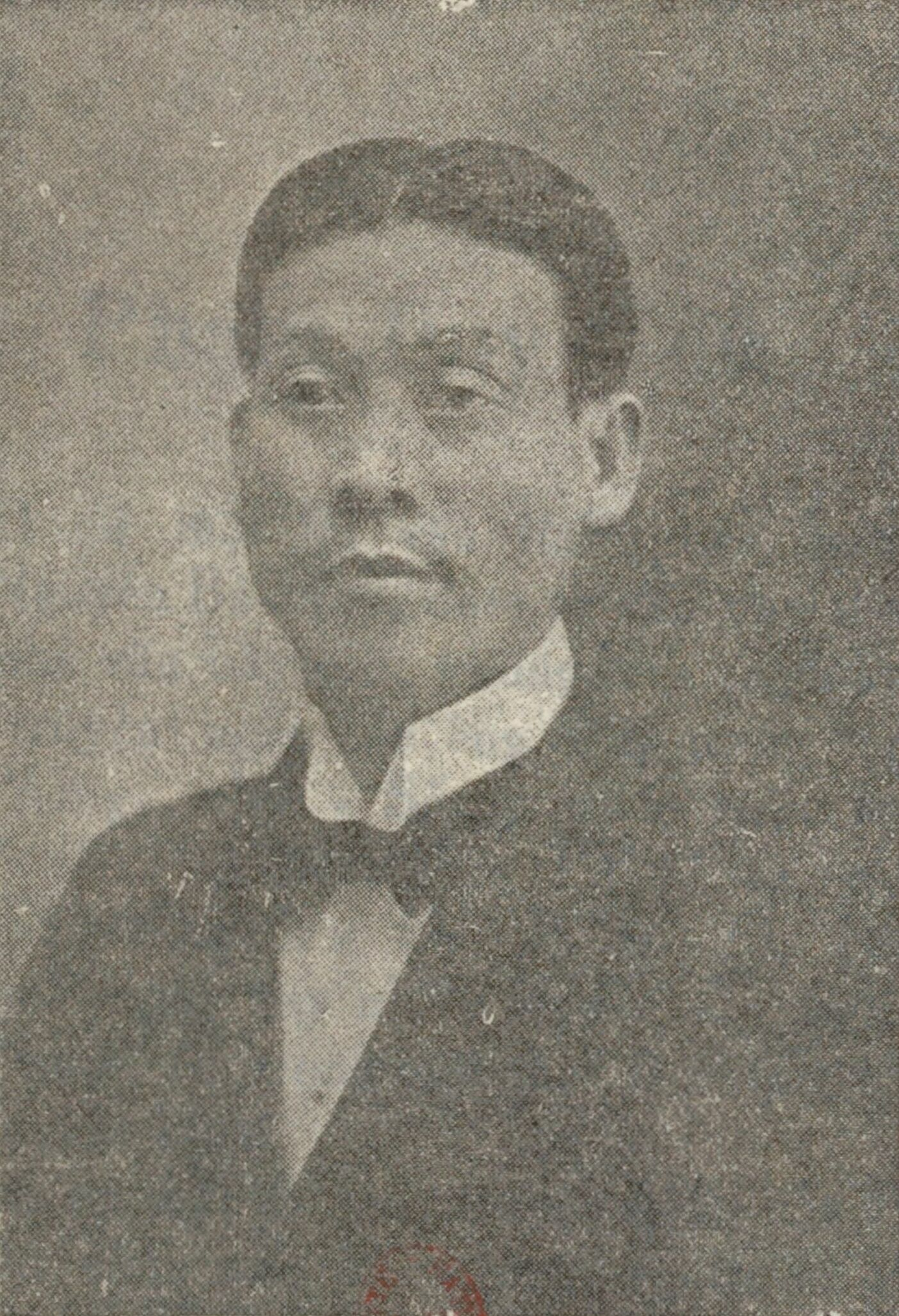
- Born: 1881; Hà Nội, French protectorate of Tonkin
- Died: 1924 (aged 42–43); Hàng Dầu, Hà Nội, Tonkin
- Other names: Ưu Thời Mẫn, Đông Phương Sóc, Thọ An
- Occupation: Writer
- Known for: Sống chết mặc bay
- Children: Phạm Duy Khiêm; Phạm Duy

Phạm Duy Tốn (1881 – 25 February 1924) was a Vietnamese writer. He was father of the songwriter Phạm Duy and French language writer and ambassador Phạm Duy Khiêm. He was widely considered as the first Vietnamese writer who wrote short stories following Western style.

Phạm was born 1881 in Phố Hàng Dầu, Hà Nội in an oil merchant family.

In 1901, Phạm graduated from the French School of Interpreters, and began working for Residential Palace of the Tonkin Governor. In 1907 he was appointed one of three teachers at the Hội Trí Tri (en: Association for Mutual Education, fr: Société d’Enseignement Mutuel du Tonkin) in Hanoi.

In 1913, Phạm joined the editorial board of the Đông Dương tạp chí — a magazine that actively promoted Quốc ngữ via translated articles from original Chinese and French works, managed by Nguyễn Văn Vĩnh. He published alongside Confucian writers like Nguyễn Bá Học in Nam Phong magazine, showing more ability to give straightforward prose unconstrained by classical structures.

In 1922, Phạm Duy Tốn along with Nguyễn Văn Vĩnh, and Phạm Quỳnh attended Exposition nationale coloniale in Marseille. After returning home from Marseille, his tuberculosis worsened till he died in Hàng Dầu in February 1924.

His writing touched on social themes, as in the story Sống chết mặc bay (Who Cares if you Survive or Die, 1918) but open criticism of the French had to be veiled in social narrative.

== Works ==
- Sống chết mặc bay (1918)
- Con người Sở Khanh (1919)
- Nước đời lắm nỗi (1920)
- Tiếu lâm quảng ký (1920)
- Phạm Duy Tốn, Tác phẩm chọn lọc (complete works) ed. Cừ Nguyẽ̂n - 2002
