= Ánh Tuyết =

Vietnamese singer

Ánh Tuyết, real name Trần Thị Tiếc, (born 1 March 1961 in Hội An) is a Vietnamese songstress and businesswoman. She is particularly associated with older pre-Vietnam War songs, and also the 70s songs of Văn Cao and Trịnh Công Sơn.
