= Nhã Ca =

Vietnamese-American poet and novelist

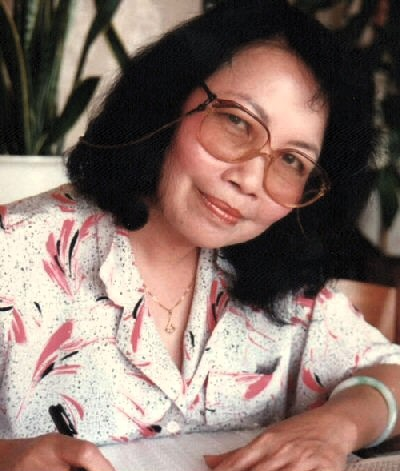
Nhã Ca, Vietnamese poet

Nhã Ca (pen name for Trần Thị Thu Vân; 20 October 1939, Huế, Vietnam) is a Vietnamese-American poet and novelist.

Trần Thị Thu Vân grew up in Huế and studied at Đồng Khánh College there. She moved to Saigon in 1960 and married the poet Trần Dạ Từ, with whom she had seven children.

She wrote over the years, a little over twenty books, mainly novels, and was the founder of the publishing house Thương Yêu. She took the pseudonym, Nhã Ca, which means "little anthem", from the Song of Solomon in the Bible.

In 1975, after Vietnam's reunification, she was identified her as one of ten authors, and the only female, who were blacklisted as a "cultural guerrilla" and she was a political prisoner in jail for two years from 1976. Her husband was also imprisoned for the same charge and sat in prison twelve years, 1977-89. After the husband's release, the eldest son, was able travel to Sweden, where he persuaded the Swedish Pen Club to take up the case with the Swedish government, after which the family received political asylum in Sweden and exit permits. Nha Ca, her husband, and several of their children later moved on to the United States and settled in California in 1992.

In the US, the couple founded the newspaper Việt Báo. Nha Ca's subsequent literary output has been limited, though in 2006, she published a novel in four thick volumes, Đường Tự Do (Việt Báo, Westminster 2006).

== Mourning headband for Hué ==
Nha Ca arrived in Huế before the Tết weekend in January, 1968 to attend the Buddhist funeral of her father. She became stranded in town because of the Tet Offensive by the forces of North Vietnam and the Viet Cong. She described the horrors she experienced during the Battle of Huế in the documentary book Giai Khăn Sô cho Huế (Mourning headband for Hue), published in Vietnamese in 1969. Only a few of her books have been translated into English or French. This book was translated into English under the title Mourning headband Hue. In Vietnam, it was banned in 1975.

== Selected works ==
1. Nhã Ca mới (1965)
2. Đêm nghe tiếng đại bác (1966)
3. Đêm dậy thì (1966)
4. Bóng tối thời con gái (1967)
5. Khi bước xưống (1967)
6. Người tình ngoài mặt trận (1967)
7. Sống một ngày (1967)
8. Xuân thì (1967)
9. Những giọt nắng vàng (1968)
10. Đoàn nữ binh mùa thu (1969)
11. Giải khăn sô cho Huế (1969)
12. Một mai khi hòa bình (1969)
13. Mưa trên cây sầu đông (1969)
14. Phượng hoàng (1969)
15. Tình ca cho Huế đổ nát (1969)
16. Dạ khúc bên kia phố (1970)
17. Tình ca trong lửa đỏ (1970)
18. Đời ca hát (1971)
19. Lặn về phía mặt trời (1971)
20. Trưa áo trắng (1972)
21. Tòa bin-đing bỏ không (1973)
22. Bước khẽ tới người thương (1974)
23. Hoa phượng đừng đỏ nữa (1989)
24. Saigon cười một mình (1990)
25. Hồi ký một người mất ngày tháng (1990)
26. Chớp mắt một thời (1992)
27. Nhã Ca Thơ (1999) réédition de ses deux recueils de poésie
28. Đường Tự Do Sài Gòn (2006)
