= Phạm Tuyên =

Vietnamese musician (born 1930)

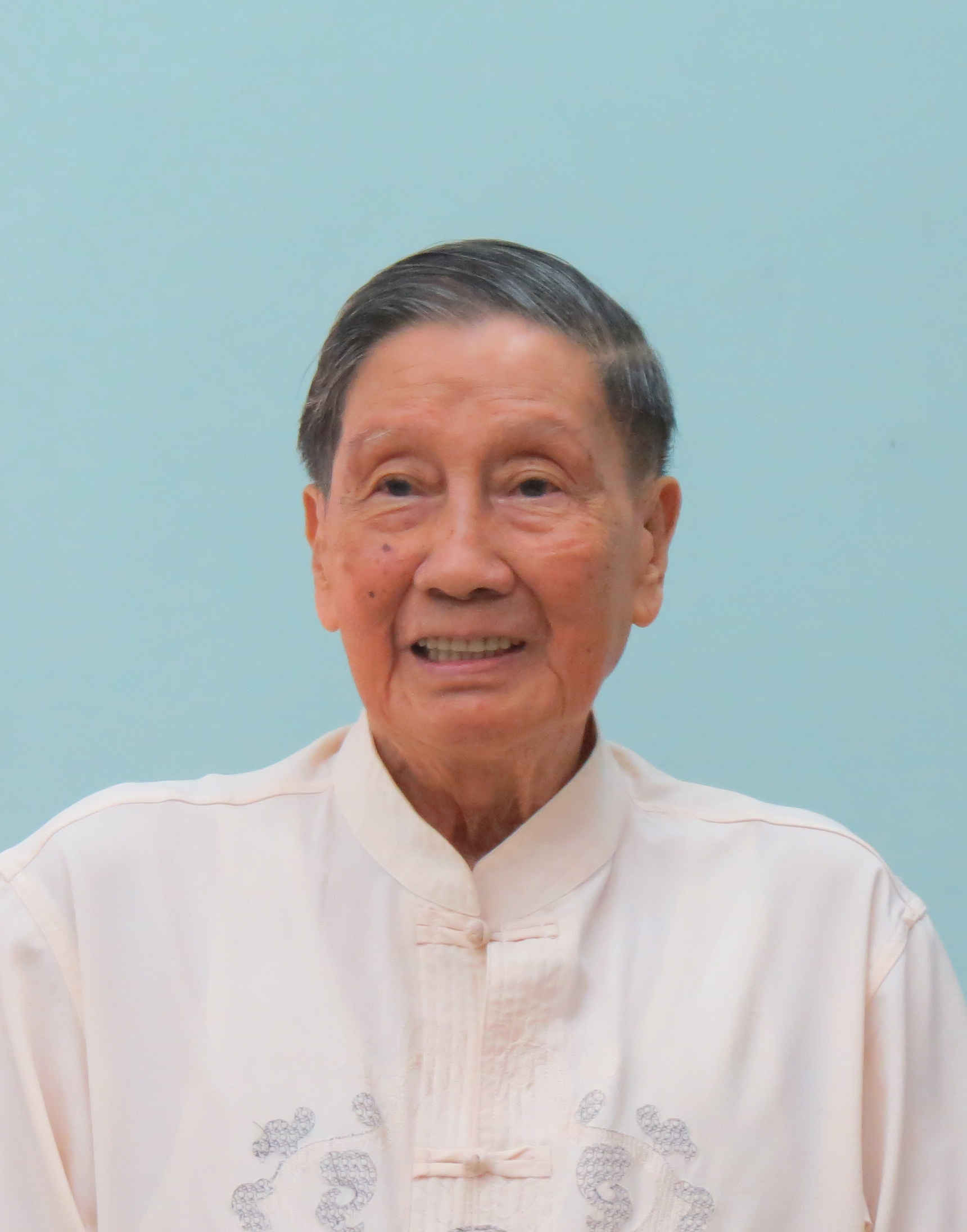
Phạm Tuyên

Phạm Tuyên (born 12 January 1930 in Hải Dương) is a Vietnamese musician. He served as the head of the music department at Hanoi's Voice of Vietnam Radio during the Vietnam War. Phạm Tuyên composed numerous popular socialist songs, including Như có Bác Hồ trong ngày vui đại thắng ("As If Uncle Hồ Were Present on the Joyous Day of Great Victory") and Đảng đã cho ta mùa xuân ("The Communist Party Has Given Us Spring").

== Biography and career ==
Phạm Tuyên was born on 12 January 1930 in the rural commune of Lương Ngọc, Bình Giang district, Hải Hưng province. He was the ninth child of the renowned journalist, scholar, and cultural researcher Phạm Quỳnh (1892–1945), who was executed by the Việt Minh in 1945.

In 1949, Phạm Tuyên attended the Trần Quốc Tuấn School of Land force, Course V. In 1950, he served as a company leader (a military unit, not a commercial company) at Trường Thiếu sinh quân Việt Nam (Vietnamese Military School for Children). During this period, he began composing songs, many of which were inspired by his experiences in military schools.

In 1954, he was appointed to oversee literature, sports, and arts at Khu học xá Trung ương (Central Dormitory) in Nam Ninh, China. He returned to Vietnam in 1958 and joined the Voice of Vietnam, where he assumed the role of music editor. Between 1958 and 1975, he composed numerous popular songs, including Bài ca người thợ rừng ("The Song of Lumbermen"), Bài ca người thợ mỏ ("The Song of Miners"), the choral piece Miền Nam anh dũng và bất khuất ("The Heroic and Undaunted South Vietnam"), Bám biển quê hương ("Cling to the Homeland’s Sea"), Yêu biết mấy những con đường ("How I Love the Roads"), Chiếc gậy Trường Sơn ("The Trường Sơn Stick"), Gảy đàn lên hỡi người bạn Mỹ ("Play the Guitar, My American Friend"), Từ làng Sen ("From Sen Village"), Đêm trên Cha Lo ("Night at Cha Lo"), and Từ một ngã tư đường phố ("From a Street Intersection").

The iconic song Như có Bác Hồ trong ngày vui đại thắng ("As If Uncle Hồ Were Present on the Joyous Day of Great Victory") was composed on the night of 28 April 1975, recorded in the afternoon of the same day, and broadcast in a special newscast at 5 p.m., coinciding with North Vietnam's capture of South Vietnam, marking the official end of the Vietnam War.

After 1975, Phạm Tuyên continued to produce popular songs, including Gửi nắng cho em ("Sending Sunshine to You"), Con kênh ta đào ("The Canal We Dug"), and Màu cờ tôi yêu ("The Flag I Love"), with lyrics by Diệp Minh Tuyền. His song Thành phố mười mùa hoa ("The City of Ten Flower Seasons"), with lyrics by Lệ Bình, was composed in 1985.

Chiến đấu vì độc lập tự do ("Fight for Independence and Freedom") was written at the beginning of the 1979 Sino-Vietnamese War. This song marked the beginning of a musical movement known as biên giới phía Bắc ("The Northern Border"), which honoured the bravery of Vietnamese soldiers who fought against Chinese forces. However, these songs were later withdrawn from circulation after Sino-Vietnamese relations were normalized.

Phạm Tuyên also composed many songs for children and young audiences, some of which became immensely popular, including Tiến lên đoàn viên ("March Forward, Members of the Communist Youth Union"), Chiếc đèn ông sao ("The Star-shaped Lantern"), Hành khúc Đội thiếu niên Tiền phong Hồ Chí Minh ("March of the Hồ Chí Minh Young Pioneer Organization"), Hát dưới cờ Hà Nội ("Singing Under Hanoi’s Flag"), Gặp nhau giữa trời thu Hà Nội ("Meeting in Hanoi’s Autumn Sky"), Đêm pháo hoa ("Fireworks Night"), and Cô và mẹ ("The Teacher and the Mother").

In addition to his musical works, Phạm Tuyên authored numerous articles on musical aesthetics, songs, and their composers. He was also the initiator and director of many national musical competitions, including Tiếng hát hoa phượng đỏ ("The Song of Red Flamboyant Flowers") and Liên hoan Văn nghệ truyền hình toàn quốc ("National Television Arts and Letters Festival"). He served as the President of the Board of Examiners at many national arts festivals organized by the Ministry of Culture and various other institutions.

Phạm Tuyên was a member of the Standing Committee of the Executive Board of the Hội nhạc sĩ Việt Nam (Vietnamese Musicians' Association) from 1963 to 1983.

Phạm Tuyên retired and currently resides in Hà Nội.

== Printed works ==
=== Song collection ===
- Chiếc gậy Trường Sơn (The Trường Sơn Stick), Âm nhạc Publishing House, 1973.
- Phạm Tuyên (Collection of Songs by Phạm Tuyên), Văn hoá Publishing House, 1982.
- Gửi nắng cho em (Sending Sunshine to You), Âm nhạc Publishing House, 1991.
- Ca khúc Phạm Tuyên (Phạm Tuyên's Songs), a collection of 50 songs, Âm nhạc Publishing House, 1994.

=== Audio-cassette tapes ===
- Gửi nắng cho em (Sending Sunshine to You), Saigon Audio, 1992.
- Lời ru của đêm (The Night's Lullaby), Công ty Đầu tư Phát triển, Ministry of Culture and Information, 1993.

=== Music books ===
- Các bạn trẻ hãy đến với âm nhạc ("My Young Friends, Let's Come to Music"), Thanh niên Publishing House, 1982.
- Âm nhạc ở quanh ta ("The Music Around Us"), Kim Đồng Publishing House, 1987.

== Notable works ==
=== Original Vietnamese compositions ===
- 36 sợi phố
- Bài ca người thợ mỏ ("The Song of Miners")
- Bài ca người thợ rừng ("The Song of Lumbermen")
- Bám biển quê hương ("Cling to the Homeland’s Sea")
- Chiếc đèn ông sao ("The Star-shaped Lantern")
- Chiếc gậy Trường Sơn ("The Trường Sơn Stick") (1967)
- Chiến đấu vì độc lập tự do ("Fight for Independence and Freedom") (1979)
- Cô và mẹ ("The Teacher and the Mother")
- Con kênh ta đào ("The Canal We Dug")
- Đảng cho ta một mùa xuân ("The Party Gives Us Spring")
- Đảng đã cho ta sáng mắt, sáng lòng ("The Party Has Opened Our Eyes and Minds")
- Đêm trên Cha Lo ("Night at Cha Lo")
- Đêm pháo hoa ("Fireworks Night")
- Em vào thiếu sinh quân ("I Join the Military Cadets")
- Gảy đàn lên hỡi người bạn Mỹ ("Play the Guitar, My American Friend")
- Gặp nhau giữa trời thu Hà Nội ("Meeting in Hanoi’s Autumn Sky")
- Gửi nắng cho em ("Sending Sunshine to You")
- Hà Nội Điện Biên Phủ ("Hanoi – Điện Biên Phủ")
- Hành khúc Đội thiếu niên Tiền phong Hồ Chí Minh ("March of the Hồ Chí Minh Young Pioneer Organization")
- Hát dưới cờ Hà Nội ("Singing Under Hanoi’s Flag")
- Hợp xướng miền Nam anh dũng và bất khuất ("Chorus of the Heroic and Undaunted South Vietnam")
- Khúc hát ru của người mẹ trẻ ("Lullaby of the Young Mother")
- Lớp học rừng ("The Forest Classroom") (1950)
- Màu cờ tôi yêu ("The Flag I Love") (lyrics by Diệp Minh Tuyền)
- Như có Bác trong ngày đại thắng ("As If Uncle Hồ Were Present on the Joyous Day of Great Victory") (1975)
- Rước đèn dưới ánh trăng ("Carrying Lanterns Under the Moonlight")
- Thành phố mười mùa hoa ("The City of Ten Flower Seasons") (1985, lyrics by Lệ Bình)
- Thiếu sinh quân ở một nơi thật vừa ("Cadets in a Perfect Place") (1950)
- Tiến lên đoàn viên ("March Forward, Members of the Communist Youth Union") (1954)
- Trường chúng cháu là trường mầm non ("Our School is a Kindergarten")
- Từ làng Sen ("From Sen Village")
- Từ một ngã tư đường phố ("From a Street Intersection")
- Yêu biết mấy những con đường ("How I Love the Roads")
- Tiếng chuông và ngọn cờ ("The Bell and the Flag")

=== Folk songs (Đồng Dao) ===
- Bà Còng đi chợ ("Grandmother Còng Goes to the Market")
- Bầu và bí ("The Gourd and the Pumpkin")
- Cái bống bình ("The Clay Pot")
- Cái cò đi đón cơn mưa ("The Egret Welcomes the Rain")
- Con chim chích choè ("The Magpie Robin")
- Gánh gánh gồng gồng ("Carrying the Load")
- Nhớ ơn ("Gratitude")
- Rềnh rềnh ràng ràng ("Busy and Bustling")
- Tay đẹp ("Beautiful Hands")
- Tu hú là chú bồ các ("The Cuckoo is a Starling")

=== Japanese adaptations (1993) ===
- Bài hát về Doraemon ("Song About Doraemon"), from Doraemon No Uta
- Bầu trời là cái túi to ("The Sky is a Big Pocket"), from Aoi Sora Wa Pocket Sa
- Bầu trời xanh đẹp tuyệt vời! ("The Beautiful Blue Sky"), from Aozoratte Iina
- Biển và chúng ta ("The Sea and Us"), from Umi Wa Bokura To
- Chúng mình là người sống trên trái đất ("We Are the People Living on Earth"), from Bokutachi Chikyuujin
- Mãi mãi là bạn bên nhau ("Forever Friends"), from Tomodachi Dakara
- Mình là Doraemon ("I Am Doraemon"), from Boku Doraemon
- Người du khách ("The Traveler"), from Toki No Tabibito
- Thời niên thiếu ("Youthful Days"), from Shounen Ki
- Tôi không hiểu vì sao ("I Don’t Know Why"), from Watashi Ga Fushigi
- Vì có bạn ("Because You Are Here"), from Kimi Ga Iru Kara
- Vang tận trời cao ("Echoing to the Sky"), from Ten Made Todoke
