= Gilbert Trần Chánh Chiếu =

Vietnamese writer, journalist and reformer

Trần Chánh Chiếu
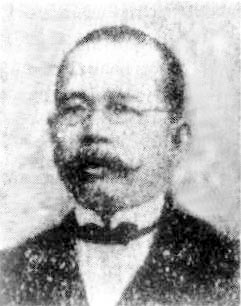
- Born: 1868
- Died: 1919 (aged 50–51)
- Other names: Gilbert Chiếu; Kỳ Lân Các
- Occupation(s): Businessman, Journalist
- Organization(s): Nông Cổ Mín Đàm; Lục Tỉnh Tân Văn
- Movement: Minh Tân movement

Gilbert Trần Chánh Chiếu (1868–1919) was a Vietnamese independence activist and the subject of "l'Affaire Gilbert Chieu". He used his French citizenship and his position as hotel owner, businessman, editor of the Saigon Quốc Ngữ newspaper Lục Tỉnh Tân Văn and the French version Le Moniteur des Provinces, as well as being one of the first attorneys at law in Saigon, to cover for the fact that he was in fact an agent of the Duy Tân Hội society based in Japan and led by Vietnamese revolutionaries Phan Bội Châu and Prince Cường Để.

Hating Gibert Chiếu for his scornful attitude with them, some close-collaborators of the French tried to denounce his cooperation with Duy Tân Hội. At the end of October 1908, a series of 92 arrests was made, including Gilbert Chiếu himself, but at trial evidence proved insufficient to convict. Gilbert Chiếu and most of his companions were released in April 1909.

In 1917, Gilbert Chiếu was arrested again by the French on suspicion of hidden supports for 1916 Cochinchina uprising, but was released later due to the lack of evidence.
