= Đông Dương tạp chí =

Vietnamese newspaper

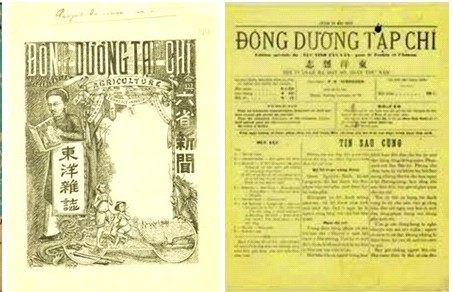
Cover of Đông Dương tạp chí newspaper

The Đông Dương tạp chí (chữ Hán: 東洋雜誌; lit. 'Journal of the Indochina'; 1913-1919), was a Vietnamese quốc ngữ newspaper in Hanoi founded by François-Henri Schneider and Nguyễn Văn Vĩnh. The paper was technically owned by François-Henri Schneider, since only a Frenchman could obtain a license to publish a newspaper, Its French sister paper was France-Indochine.

Schneider had earlier been involved with founding the Lục Tỉnh Tân Văn (1907, Six Provinces News, Chinese 六省新聞) another Vietnamese newspaper published in Saigon, behind which stood the industrialist Gilbert Trần Chánh Chiếu.
