= Nguyễn Văn Huyên =

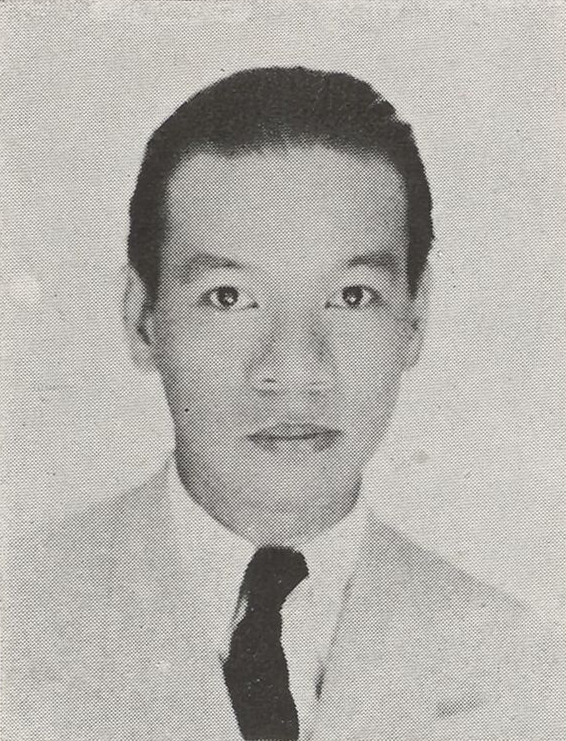

3rd Minister of National Education
- In office 1946–1975

Personal details
- Born: 16 November 1905 Hanoi, Indochina
- Died: 19 October 1975 (aged 69)

Nguyễn Văn Huyên (16 November 1905 – 19 October 1975) was a Vietnamese professor and the Minister of Education of Vietnam from 1946 to 1975.

== Biography ==
He was born on 16 November 1905 in Hanoi. His father was a civil servant to the French colonial government. His older sister, Nguyen Thi Mao, graduated from the Indochina Teacher Training College and became a teacher in Vietnam.

At the age of 18, he and his younger brother, Nguyen Van Huong were sent to France to study abroad. He received a BA in literature in 1929 and a second BA in 1931 from Sorbonne University. He received his Ph.D. in France and taught at the School of Oriental Languages. In 1934 he was the first Vietnamese to successfully defend his doctoral dissertation at the Sorbonne University in Paris. His dissertation was on "Young Women and Men Singing in Annam" and "Introduction to Research Stilt House in Southeast Asia".

He returned home in 1935 and married Vi Kim Ngoc, the daughter of the Governor-General Vi Van Dinh in 1936. In 1938 he joined the Society for the Propagation of the National Language and moved to study at the Antique Far East School. In 1941, he joined the Indochinese Scientific Research Council. He assisted in the founding of the Department of Civil History of Vietnam at Hanoi Law University and participated in activities with the Vietnam Socialist Party.

After the August Revolution in 1945, he was appointed Director of the University of Education, Ministry of National Education and Director of the Institute of Antiques.

In November 1946, he was appointed Minister of National Education (now the Ministry of Education) of the Government of the Democratic Republic of Vietnam and held the post for 29 years until his death.

== Death ==
He died on 19 October 1975.

Nguyen Van Huyen Museum located at Hamlet 5, Lai Xa village, Kim Chung commune, Hoai Duc district, Hanoi retains a collection of his works.

== Works ==
- Divine worship in the South (1944)
- Civilization of South Vietnam (1944)
- Collection by Nguyen Van Huyen (2000)

== Family ==
- Nguyen Kim Nu Hanh (1937-2010), or Nguyen Kim Hanh, former information engineer of the General Railway Administration, author of the memoir "Next step father".
- Nguyen Kim Bich Ha, Nguyen Bich Ha, Associate Professor, Doctor of Chemistry, Rector of Nguyen Van Huyen School (Hanoi)
- Nguyen Kim Nu Hieu, Colonel, Associate Professor, Doctor of Medicine, People's Doctor, former deputy director of the Military Hospital 108. Her husband is GS. People's Teacher Nguyen Lan Dung.
- Nguyen Van Huy, Professor, PhD, former Director of Vietnam Museum of Ethnology.
