= Phạm Quỳnh =

Vietnamese politician

His Excellency Phạm Quỳnh (范瓊)
- Thượng Chi (尚之), Hoa Đường (華堂), Hồng Nhân (紅人)
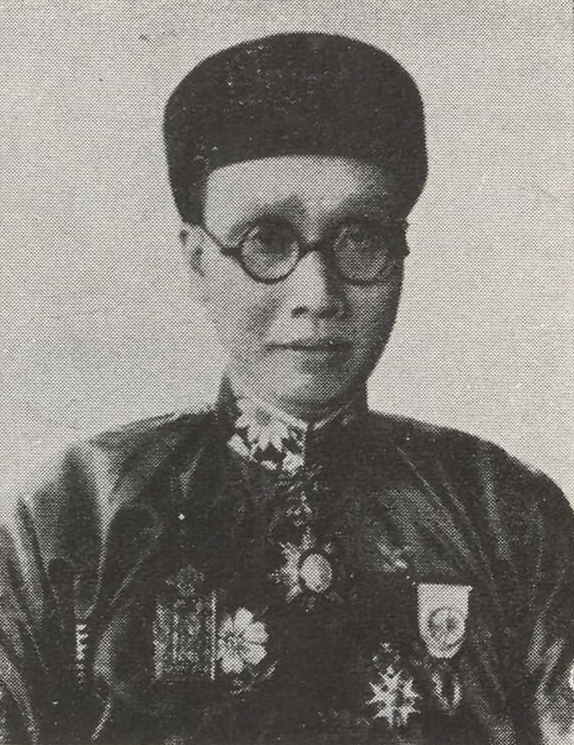

Thượng thư of the Ministry of Personnel
- In office 1942–1945
- Monarch: Bảo Đại
- Preceded by: Thái Văn Toản
- Succeeded by: Trần Đình Nam (as Minister of Internal Affairs)

Thượng thư of the Ministry of National Education
- In office 1933–1942
- Monarch: Bảo Đại
- Preceded by: Thân Trọng Huề (as Minister of Education)
- Succeeded by: Trần Thanh Đạt

Đổng lý of the Ngự tiền Văn phòng
- In office 1932–1933
- Monarch: Bảo Đại
- Preceded by: Position established

Editor-in-Chief of the Nam Phong tạp chí
- In office 1917–1932
- Preceded by: Position established
- Succeeded by: Nguyễn Tiến Lãng

Personal details
- Born: December 17, 1892 Hanoi, Tonkin, French Indochina
- Died: September 6, 1945 (aged 52) Thừa Thiên province, Trung Bộ, Democratic Republic of Vietnam
- Spouse: Lê Thị Vân (1892-1953)
- Children: Phạm Giao; Phạm Thị Giá; Phạm Thị Thức; Phạm Bích; Phạm Thị Hảo; Phạm Thị Ngoạn; Phạm Khuê; Phạm Thị Hoàn; Phạm Tuyên; Phạm Thị Diễm (Giễm); Phạm Thị Lệ; Phạm Tuân; Phạm Thị Viên.
- Parent: Phạm Hữu Điển (father)
- Education: Pomelo School
- Profession: Journalist, mandarin
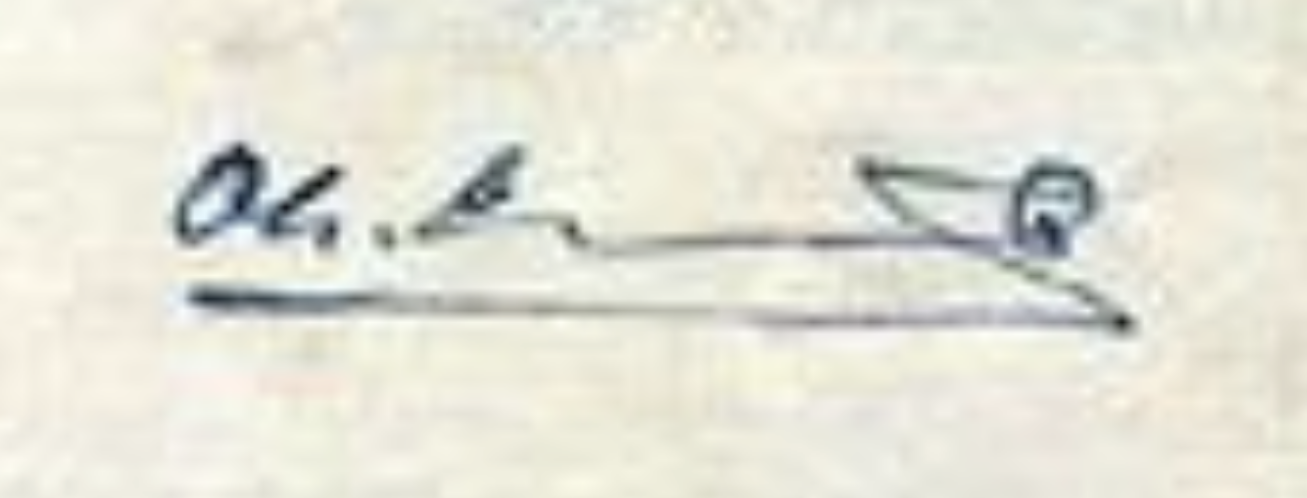
- Signature

Phạm Quỳnh (December 17, 1892 – September 6, 1945) was a monarchist during the late Nguyễn dynasty and supporter of adhering to traditional Vietnamese customs in the establishment of a constitutional monarchy. He was born near Hanoi, Vietnam, to a literati family of Hải Dương province. He was appointed Minister of Education to the royal court at Huế in 1932, and held several other posts in the court as premier and Minister of the Interior for Emperor Bảo Đại's government. He served as a government minister along with Ngô Đình Diệm under Emperor Bảo Đại's administration. After the August Revolution in 1945, he was killed by the Viet Minh along with Ngô Đình Khôi and his son, two other high-ranking members of the former Bảo Đại's cabinet.

Phạm Quỳnh graduated top of his class from the College of the Protectorate in Hanoi and was appointed as an interpreter in the Ecole Francaise d'Extreme-Orient. Phạm Quỳnh dedicated his early years at the school to mastering classical Chinese, and could easily read the Confucian classics which he thought represented the soul of Vietnamese people. In 1913, fellow journalist and collaborator Nguyễn Văn Vĩnh invited him to be an assistant editor to the weekly journal Đông Dương tạp chí (Indochina Magazine). However, the journal’s aggressive pro-French position alienated its prospective readership, and in 1917 Governor-General Albert Sarraut and chief of the Surete Louis Marty decided to sponsor the creation of Nam Phong (Southern Wind), a new journal with Phạm Quỳnh at the head. Apart from editing Nam Phong, Phạm Quỳnh also wrote for several other French and Vietnamese journals, and authored one of the earliest Quốc ngữ dictionaries.

== Nam Phong tạp chí ==
Nam Phong Tap Chi 1

Nam Phong (Southern Wind) was a periodical that sought to create a new forum for elite debates surrounding colonial society and was written in Quốc ngữ. Phạm Quỳnh often engaged in heated debates with Nguyễn Văn Vĩnh over the issue of assimilation versus association in their respective journals, Nam Phong and L'Annam Nouveau. However, Nam Phong's political platform was also deemed too pro-French and sycophantic by some, and was often mocked by rival journal Phong Hóa, which was run by members of the Tự-Lực văn-đoàn.

== Heritage ==
On May 28, 2016, the Phạm's Council in Vietnam collaborated with the family of musician Phạm Tuyên held the inauguration ceremony of the tomb restoration work and the erecting of Phạm Quỳnh's statue in Huế City.

The bust of Phạm Quỳnh was designed by his grandson, architect Tôn Thất Đại, is 60 cm tall x 50 cm wide, placed on a pedestal nearly 2 meters high, behind his grave in front of the Vạn Phước pagoda (Trường An Ward, Huế City).

The front of the tomb is covered with a black stone stele engraved with his famous saying:

Truyện Kiều còn tiếng ta còn. Tiếng ta còn nước ta còn.

("The Tale of Kieu remains then Our language remains. Our language remains then Our country remains.")
