= Lương Văn Can =

Vietnamese mandarin, school administrator, independence activist and writer

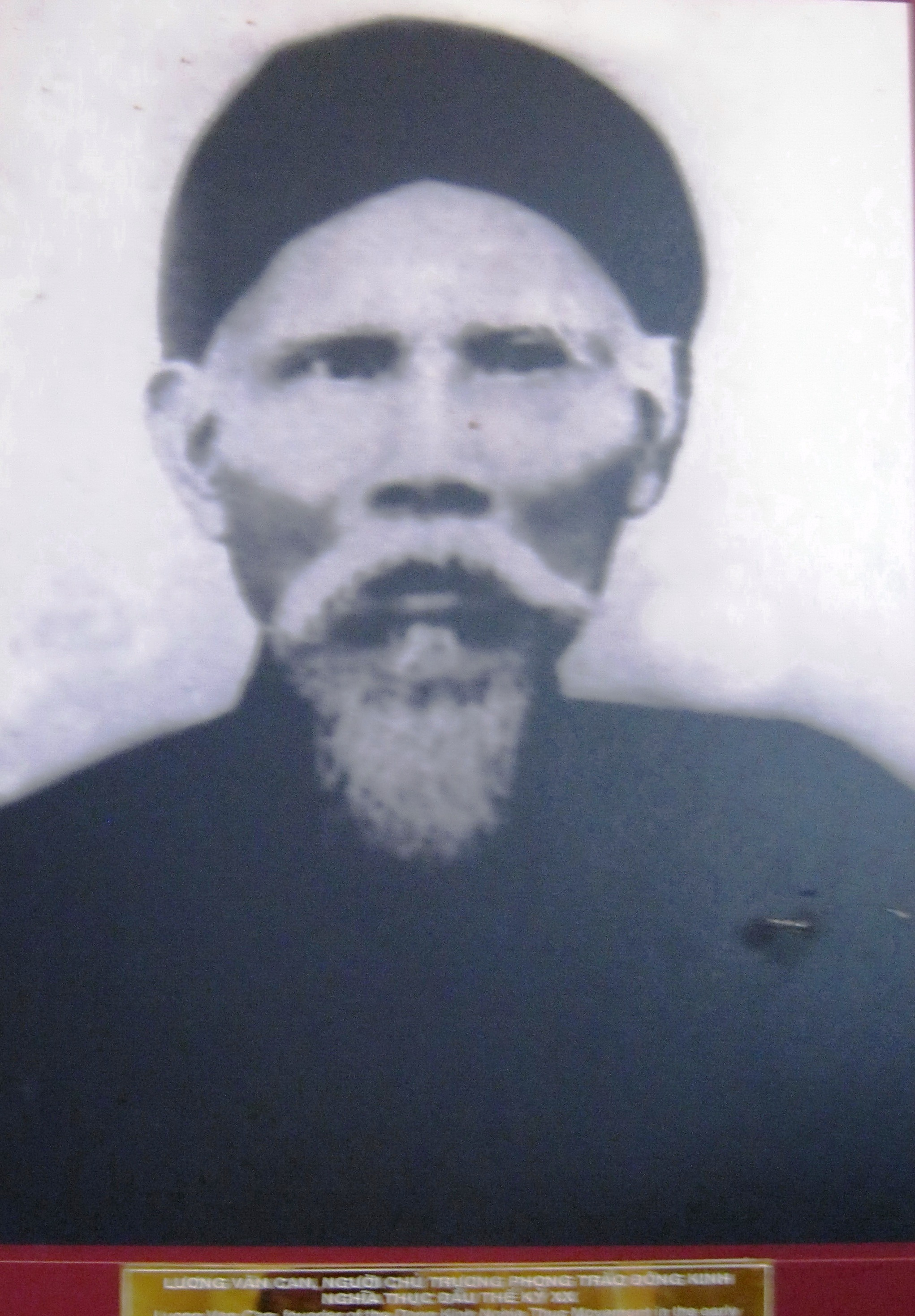
- Organization: Tonkin Free School
- Movement: Duy Tân movement
- Children: Lương Lập Nham; Lương Nghị Khanh

Lương Văn Can (梁文玕, 1854–1927) was a Vietnamese mandarin, school administrator, independence activist and writer. His most noted work is Nhà nước, "The State".
