= Thái Phiên =

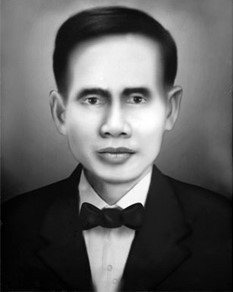
Portrait of Mr. Thái Phiên (identified by his family)

Thái Phiên (1882–1916), was a Vietnamese scholar and revolutionary from Quảng Nam Province, also known by the alias Nam Xương. He was an associate of Phan Bội Châu, and was involved in both the Vietnam Restoration League (Vietnamese: Việt Nam Quang Phục Hội) and the Đông Du movement. In his autobiography, Phan Bội Châu lauded Phien's services and devotion to the cause of Vietnamese independence, describing him as a man who "worked ardently in the cause of our country". "When there were almost no comrades remaining inside our country", he wrote, "it was he alone who stood fast". Phan also described him as being "skillful in dealing with finances and handling the conduct of affairs". On 4 May 1916, Phien and Trần Cao Vân led the abortive rebellion against French Authorities initiated by the Vietnam Restoration League. Both were beheaded on 17 May in An Hoa, Huế.

After the 1945 August Revolution, the Việt Minh briefly renamed the city of Tourane after Thai Phien, to commemorate his role in the 1916 uprising.

== See also ==
- French Indochina
