= Ngô Đức Kế =

Vietnamese anti-colonial intellectual

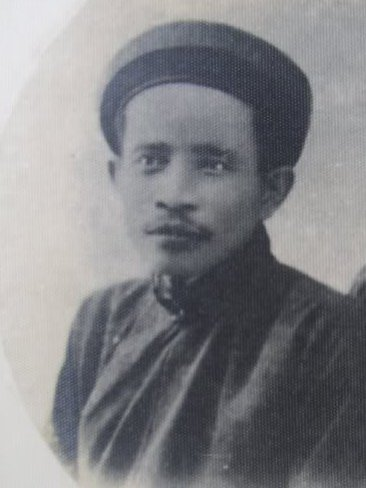
- Born: 1878; Hà Tĩnh
- Died: 1929 (aged 50–51); Hà Nội
- Other name: Tập Xuyên
- Occupation: Journalist
- Organization: Duy Tân Hội
- Movement: Duy Tân Movement

Ngô Đức Kế (1878–1929), courtesy name Tập Xuyên, was a prominent scholar-gentry Vietnamese anti-colonial intellectual in the early 20th century. He was a key member of Duy Tân Hội as well as its public wing Duy Tân Movement, and served 13 years in Côn Đảo Prison for conspiring to overthrow the French protectorate.

== Early years ==
Ngô was born in the village of Trảo Nha in Can Lộc District in Hà Tĩnh Province. His family had a rich tradition of leadership in the imperial service, and his father was the high level mandarin of the Nguyễn dynasty. Ngô made a promising start towards emulating his forefathers, passed the Regional examination in 1897, passed the Palace examination and got the third rank doctorate title in 1901. However, he did not choose to become a mandarin, and instead returned directly to his home province to open a Traditional Chinese medicine pharmacy and a library.

During this period, he also studied some Vietanamese and Chinese modern learning books that his father sent from Huế, especially Điều trần of Nguyễn Trường Tộ and Thiên hạ đại thế luận of Nguyễn Lộ Trạch. However, Ngô was most influenced by the ideas from books of the Chinese reformists Kang Youwei and Liang Qichao, particular in the advocacy of the modernisation of the education system.

== Duy Tân Movement ==
Since early days of the movement, Ngô had contact with Phan Bội Châu, the leading Vietnamese nationalist anti-colonial figure of the time, through their mutual friend Đặng Nguyên Cẩn. He also was one of the main figures who advocated scholar gentry initiative in the opening of Vietnamese commercial businesses as a means of raising funds and awareness of their cause.

In 1907, because of criticizing Án sát (Surveillance Commissioner) of Hà Tĩnh province, Ngô was arrested and imprisoned without any proof. In 1908, the French protectorates of Annam launched a general crackdown on the scholar gentry anti-colonial movement, taking that opportunity, the native officials accused Ngô as a related figure, sentenced and sent him to Côn Sơn Prison, a jail specifically for detaining independence activists.

Later researches point out that Ngô's fundraising activities for Đông Du movement and teaching activities for Tonkin Free School had been monitored by secret polices for a long time. In 1907, both Ngô Đức Kế and Đặng Nguyên Cẩn were arrested, sentenced to death, later reduced to life imprisonment.

== Activities in journalism ==
Ngô was released from prison in 1921 after thirteen years in prison. He took up residence in Hà Nội, where he edited a low scale periodical, the Huu Thanh. Ngô earned a reputation for standing outside his office, observantly watching the vehicles roll past, the students in European dress and the women in high heels. Despite this, he declared that he was in favor of meaningful modern civilisation.

Ngô also derided the way that Vietnamese employees of the French colonial system squabbled among themselves over their personal status and standing. He felt that the attention to hierarchical decorum was excessive and regressive.

== Polemic about value of The Tale of Kiều ==
Ngô advocated the adoption of the Romanised quốc ngữ to replace the chữ nôm script used in Vietnam for writing. He was unlike many of his contemporaries in feeling that eh educational emphasis was not in translating old Vietnamese literature into quốc ngữ but for the introduction of European scientific, political, economic and legal knowledge to be put into quốc ngữ. He called for quốc ngữ to appeal to the needs of the wider populace, rather than only classical traditional scholars who were focused on literature. In one case, he strongly criticised the view of the mandarin Phạm Quỳnh, who strongly praised Nguyễn Du's epic romantic poem, The Tale of Kiều, which is widely considered as Vietnam's national poem. Phạm saw the Kieu as the soul and essence of Vietnam. Phạm felt that if the literature of Vietnam survived, then so would the language and thus the country. Ngô felt the opposites, reasoning that the survival of the people was the only way to safeguard the language and thus the literary heritage.

== Works ==
=== Poems ===
- Hỏi Gia Long (Ask Gia Long)
- Đề Thái Nguyên thất nhật quang phục ký (Diary of 7-day Thái Nguyên uprising)

=== Essays ===
- Điếu Phan Chu Trinh (Weep for Phan Châu Trinh)

== Memory ==
Most cities in Vietnam, regardless of the political orientation of the government, have named major streets after him.
