= Nguyễn Thần Hiến =

Vietnamese anti-colonial activist

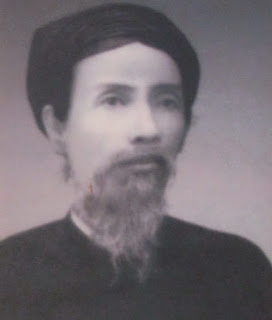
- Organization(s): Duy Tân Hội, Việt Nam Quang Phục Hội
- Movement: Đông-Du Movement

Nguyễn Thần Hiến (1856–1914) was a Vietnamese scholar-gentry anti-colonial revolutionary activist who advocated independence from French colonial rule. He was a contemporary of Phan Bội Châu and Phan Chu Trinh and was regarded as the most prominent southerner of his generation of scholar-gentry activists.

== Life ==
Hien came from a family into the Mekong Delta province of Hà Tiên. His father was a district magistrate in the nearby province of Vĩnh Long before coming home to serve as the governor of Ha Tien in the last years of the Nguyễn dynasty before French colonization. According to a family register, Hien was a quick-learner as a student in his youth, known for his abilities in mastering the classics. By the age of 20, in 1876, he was considered to be ready to enter the imperial examination system. However, southern Vietnam had been colonized by France in 1867, so his participation exams would not have had any relevance unless he was prepared to leave the south to live in the capital Huế, or some other place in the north of the country.

Thus, Hien accepted an appointment to a local colonial commission, before resigning to tend a plantation in Ha Tien, which grew pepper. He later relocated his family to Cần Thơ, the main town in the Mekong Delta, where he expanded rice fields to eventually encompass three districts and ten hamlets.

Despite his over involvement in working for the French colonial regime, Hien retained a fiercely anti-colonial ideology and remained a supporter of the Nguyễn Dynasty. This was a common feeling among southerners, even wealthy ones who had benefited from French rule, and is attributed to the role of the area in the establishment of the Nguyễn Dynasty. The dynasty had been founded by Emperor Gia Long in 1802 and in the previous decades, he had been hiding out in the Ha Tien area, after being forced out of Saigon by the Tây Sơn dynasty that ousted and killed his family, the ruling Nguyễn lords. After a long guerrilla campaign based out of Ha Tien, Nguyễn Phúc Ánh unified Vietnam in its modern state and proclaimed himself Emperor Gia Long.

By 1900, Hien had formed his own clandestine network of anti-French revolutionaries with other scholar-gentry who were like minded. He penned a poem, vowing to dedicate the remainder of his life to the struggle for Vietnamese independence under a resurrection of the monarchy. Hien was one of a generation of southern Vietnamese who had grown up under French rule for longer than his central and northern compatriots, but were more hardline against French rule than their compatriots, clinging to a dream of a revived monarchy long after republicanism had become dominant among other Vietnamese nationalists.

In early 1904, Hien met the leading Vietnamese nationalist of the time, Phan Bội Châu. Chau had traveled to meet supporters in the Mekong Delta region, where he was introduced to Hien. Hien and his wealthy landowners group agreed to become the dominant financiers of the Đông Du (Eastern Study) movement, which funded young nationalists in traveling to Japan, where they would study and participate in activism for Vietnam's independence from abroad.

In 1907, he donated a substantial amount of his financial resources to the support of the overseas students, approximated to be around 20,000 piastres. He, Nguyen Quang Dieu and other southerners formed the Khuyen Du Hoc Hoi (Society for the Encouragement of Learning), mainly a s a vehicle for supporting southern students through the process of traveling to Hong Kong and then onto Japan.

Hien later went to Canton with Chau for a meeting of expatriate revolutionaries, where the Việt Nam Quang Phục Hội (Vietnam Restoration League) was formed. This organization cited the rise in the movement for republican democracy in China as a justification for pursuing the establishment of an independent Vietnam as a republic. Hien was named in the "deliberative ministry" of the organization, as the representative for southern Vietnam.

The Quang Phuc Hoi over time began to engage in attacks on French colonial institutions and their Vietnamese collaborators. The attacks failed and were met with crackdowns. Hien and his followers in the Hong Kong branch of the movement were captured by British police in 1913.

He was handed over to the French authorities and imprisoned in Hanoi in an overcrowded prison, where he eventually became quite ill. He was not given appropriate medical treatment, until his fellow anti-colonial prison inmates went on a hunger strike and began to cause problems for the prison authorities. He was taken to a prison hospital, by which time he was already gravely ill. He died in January 1914.
