= Nguyễn Thượng Hiền =

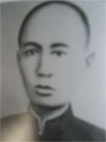
- Organization(s): Duy Tân Hội, Việt Nam Quang Phục Hội
- Movement: Đông-Du Movement

Nguyễn Thượng Hiền (阮尚賢; 1865–1925) was a Vietnamese scholar-gentry anti-colonial revolutionary activist who advocated independence from French colonial rule. He was a contemporary of Phan Bội Châu and Phan Châu Trinh and was regarded as the most prominent northerner of his generation of scholar-gentry activists.

== Biography ==
Hiền was born in the village of Liên Bạt, in Son Lang district of Hà Đông Province. His father was a minister of the Nguyễn dynasty court in Huế, and while still in his teenage year, Hien was married to the daughter of Tôn Thất Thuyết, who was then the head mandarin of Emperor Tự Đức, Vietnam's last sovereign monarch. In 1884, he passed the regional exams of the imperial examination system, and in 1885 he was successful in passing the metropolitan exams. He would then have been eligible to take the palace exams, the highest in the hierarchy. However, in the same year, his father-in-law, who was the regent of the boy emperor Hàm Nghi had planned an uprising against the French colonisation of Vietnam. Thuyết had organised a large arsenal to be accumulated in a forest base outside the capital and then orchestrated for Hàm Nghi and royal entourage to escape to the base before launching an attack on the French garrison in attempt to force the collapse of the colonial structure. However, the attack failed, so Thuyết had to go on the run with Hàm Nghi and a band of nationalist partisans, so Hien could not turn up at the examinations as a family member without risking the possibility that he would be taken hostage.

He fled to the northern town of Thanh Hóa, before returning in 1892 to place second (hoang giap) in the palace exams, something that was considered surprising given the political status of his in-laws. At the time, he became a close confidant of Nguyen Lo Trach, another Vietnamese anti-colonial activist intellectual, who advocated "self strengthening". Hien participated in Trach's small group discussions with other scholar-gentry revolutionaries, and read all of Trach's writings.

Hiền's first government position was an appointment in the historical Bureau, which possibly gave him access to more Chinese works about anti-colonialism. He was later appointed as the education commissioner (doc hoc) of Ninh Bình Province, before being transferred to the corresponding position in Nam Định Province.

Hiền met Châu and Trinh early in the 20th century, and introduced Châu to the writings of Trach. Despite his revolutionary leanings, it was not until the deposing of Emperor Thành Thái by the French colonial authorities that Hien resigned his government position. He then left Vietnam to join Chau and Prince Cường Để in Japan, where they were trying to organise anti-colonial movements from abroad.

Hiền later went to Canton with Chau for a meeting of expatriate revolutionaries, where the Việt Nam Quang Phục Hội (Vietnam Restoration League) was formed. This organization cited the rise in the movement for republican democracy in China as a justification for pursuing the establishment of an independent Vietnam as a republic. Hien was named in the "deliberative ministry" of the organization, as the representative for northern Vietnam.

After the jailing of Châu, the leadership responsibility fell to Hiền. Shortly after the outbreak of World War I, Hiền wrote and organised the printing of an impassioned plea for Vietnamese people to rise against the French colonialists, who were now also having to deal with battle commitments in Europe. He reasoned that the German progress on the Western Front in late 1914 and cited the efforts of Turkey, Egypt and Morocco in fighting against Allied forces. He ridiculed Vietnamese people in an attempt to provoke action:

Perhaps only the descendants of Hong Bang have skulls without brains, bodies without guts? . . . We still kneel down, bow our heads, kow-tow to the French like gods, revere them like saints, slaves to them all our lives; and, worse yet, we pass this on to our children and grandchildren as well. We're really a bunch of incurable invalids, a hoard of weird animals seldom seen in this world! Our blood is as abundant as water, our people as numerous as trees in this forest. Will we continue to stand around and stomach this shame forever?

He exhorted Vietnamese to avoid French conscription and being sent to the battlefields of Europe and fight on their behalf. Hiền also made contacts with German and Austro-Hungarian consulates in Bangkok, who gave him a small amount of funding to harass French army units in Vietnam, with promises of increased funding contingent on successful attacks. Most of the money was spent of badly prepared attacks on French border posts along the frontier with China, but these caused little military damage and only provoked more infighting within the Quang Phuc Hoi. In April 1915, the French executed 28 men charged with engaging in attacks near Phú Thọ. The Germans were not impressed by the activities and no funding increases were made to sustain them and the Vietnamese guerrilla attacks dwindled away.

== Legacy ==
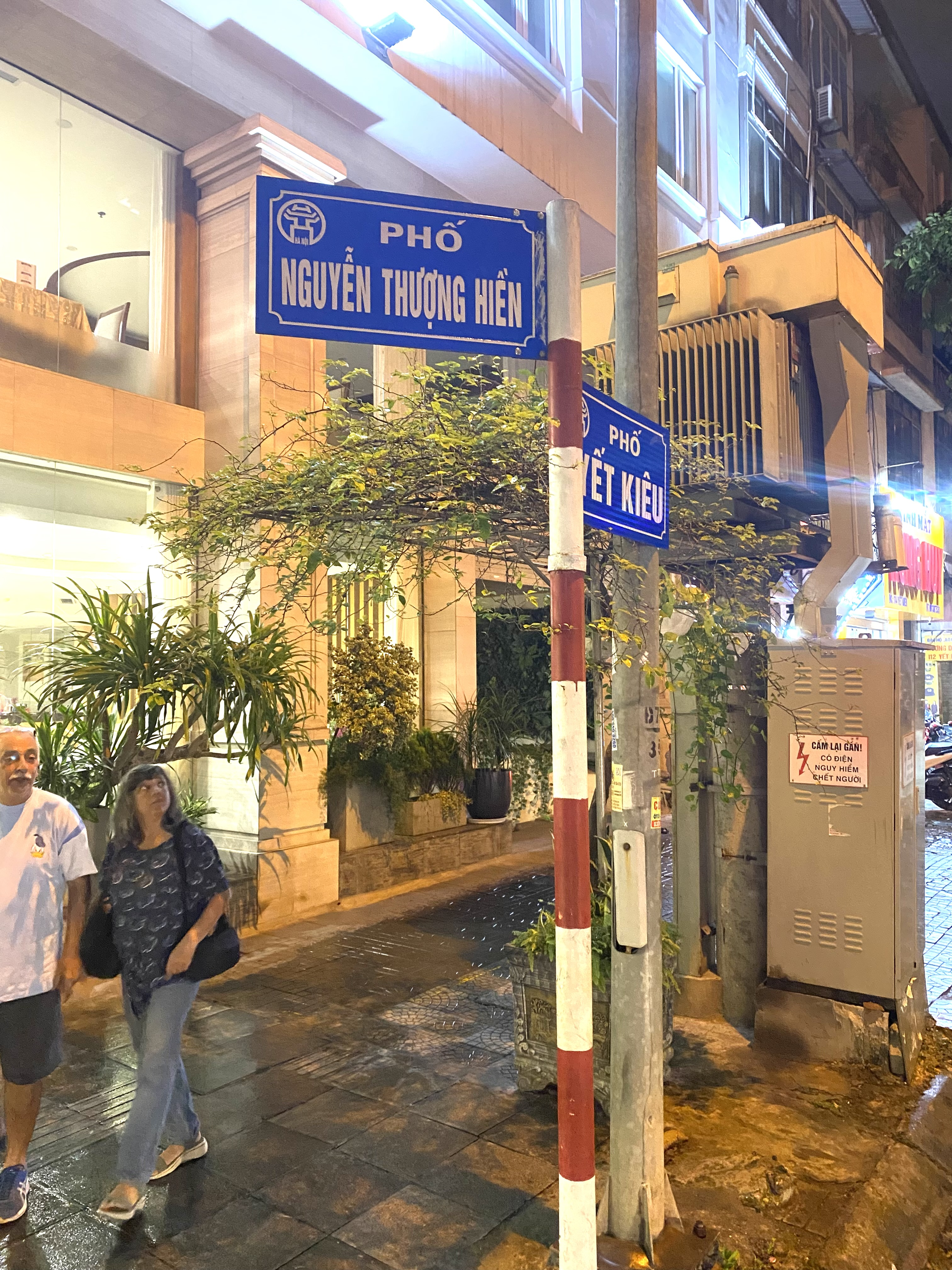
Nguyễn Thượng Hiền Street Hanoi

Most cities in Vietnam, regardless of the political orientation of the government, have named major streets after him. Additionally, Nguyễn Thượng Hiền High School, one of the most notable high schools in Ho Chi Minh City, was named in honor of him.
