= Nguyễn Thành =

Vietnamese nationalist

Nguyễn Thành 阮誠
- Born: 1863; Quảng Nam, Đại Nam
- Died: 1911 (aged 47–48); Côn Lôn, Nam Kỳ
- Other names: Tiểu La, Nguyễn Hàm
- Organization(s): Nghĩa hội Quảng Nam; Duy Tân Hội
- Movement: Cần Vương movement Duy Tân movement

Nguyễn Thành (chữ Hán: 阮誠; 1863–1911), courtesy name Nam Thạnh, later changed to Tiểu La (小羅) was a Vietnamese scholar-gentry anti-colonial revolutionary activist who advocated independence from French colonial rule. He was a co-founder of Duy Tân Hội, and a close companion of Phan Bội Châu and Phan Châu Trinh. He was imprisoned by the French and died in Côn Đảo Prison.

== Biography ==
Nguyễn was born in 1863 in the village of Thạnh Mỹ in Thăng Bình prefecture in Quảng Nam Province.

Nguyễn had come from a scholarly family, as his father was a high-ranking mandarin under Emperor Tự Đức. Nguyễn had registered to participate in the regional imperial examinations in 1885, when fighting broke out in the capital of Huế. This had come when the regent Tôn Thất Thuyết had smuggled the boy Emperor Hàm Nghi out of the city and attempted to start an uprising to expel the French colonial authorities as part of the Cần Vương movement. Nguyễn dropped his studies and joined a local resistance group. Later in the year, he was appointed as one of the military heads for the Cần Vương in the Quảng Nam and Quảng Ngãi area in central Vietnam and after several years of guerrilla fighting, he gained the respect of the French and the Vietnamese collaborators. He was eventually allowed to return to his home village by Nguyễn Thân, the infamous collaborator official who had disposed of the remains of Phan Đình Phùng, the leading anti-colonial revolutionary of the time.

Thành never attempted to resuscitate his scholarly career, and instead began to nurture his links with the younger anti-colonialists of the post-Cần Vương era. He was to become a part of the inner circle of the new generation of militants, remaining a part of Phan Bội Châu's network until he was imprisoned and died on Côn Lôn island in 1911.

In 1903, Nguyễn began his association with Phan Bội Châu, the leading Vietnamese revolutionary of the early 20th century. Phan had just become involved in the newly created Duy Tân hội (Reformation Society) that attempted to restore an independent monarchy to rule Vietnam. Phan had moved to Huế with the cover of sitting for the metropolitan imperial examinations, but intended to drum up support among the various factions of royal family. Few were willing to go against the French authorities, so he instead went to meet Nguyễn in Quảng Nam. Phan turned down Nguyễn's recommendation of Tôn Thất Thoại as the titular head, so Phan returned to Huế to concentrate on the direct descendants of Emperor Gia Long, the founder of the Nguyễn dynasty, on Nguyễn's advice. This started the political alliance between Phan and Prince Cường Để, a descendant of Gia Long.

Thus, Nguyễn became the main strategist of the Duy Tân hội, and he organised Phan's trip through the Mekong Delta region to rally further support among the remnants of the followers of the anti-colonial guerrilla Trương Định, who had resisted the initial colonisation some four decades earlier.

He was later made responsible for masterminding the planning and overseas fundraising campaigns for the Duy Tân Hội. He then planned Cường Để's travel arrangements for his political campaigning for Vietnamese independence.

In 1908, as part of a general crackdown on independence activists, Nguyễn was arrested by the French colonial authorities and sent to the prison of island of Côn Lôn, where he died.

== Legacy and memory ==
During the Republic of Vietnam period, a road beside Đà Nẵng Museum Of Chams Sculpture was named after Tiểu La. After Reunification Day, the old road was integrated to the new road 2nd September, a new road beside the Quân khu 5 Stadium was named after him instead.
