= Nguyễn Thượng Hiền High School =

Nguyen Thuong Hien High School
- Trường THPT Nguyễn Thượng Hiền

Location
- 544 Cách mạng tháng Tám St. Tân Bình District; Ho Chi Minh City; Vietnam; 10°47′35.07″N 106°39′16.62″E

Information
- Type: Public
- Established: 1970; 56 years ago
- Principal: Nguyễn Đức Chính
- Teaching staff: 151
- Grades: 10-12
- Enrollment: 2114 (2010/11)
  - Grade 10: 726
  - Grade 11: 730
  - Grade 12: 659
- Average class size: 42 (2009/10)
- Student to teacher ratio: 16:1
- Campus size: 21,000 square metres (5.2 acres)
- Campus type: Urban
- Song: Nguyễn Thượng Hiền Trường Chúng Ta (Our School - Nguyễn Thượng Hiền)
- Website: nth.e-school.edu.vn

Nguyễn Thượng Hiền High School (Vietnamese: Trường Trung học phổ thông Nguyễn Thượng Hiền) is a public high school in Ho Chi Minh City, Vietnam. It was established in 1970 under the name Tân Bình High School. Being one of the four advanced public magnet schools in the city, Nguyễn Thượng Hiền ranks thirtieth nationally in the 2012 Vietnam university admission ranking.

== History ==
In 1969, the school rented some rooms from Nhan Van Private School (now Banh Van Tran Primary School) to conduct its first academic year 1969/1970. In the next academic year, 1970/1971, the school relocated to its present location due to the completion of the campus construction. The new campus was a two-storeyed building with 12 rooms.

In the academic year 1973-74, the school was renamed as Nguyễn Thượng Hiền School in honor of Nguyễn Thượng Hiền. However, twelve years later, the government decided to change the name to Nguyễn Văn Trỗi High School. Soon after, however, the school was renamed again as Nguyễn Thượng Hiền High School in 1990.

== Facilities ==
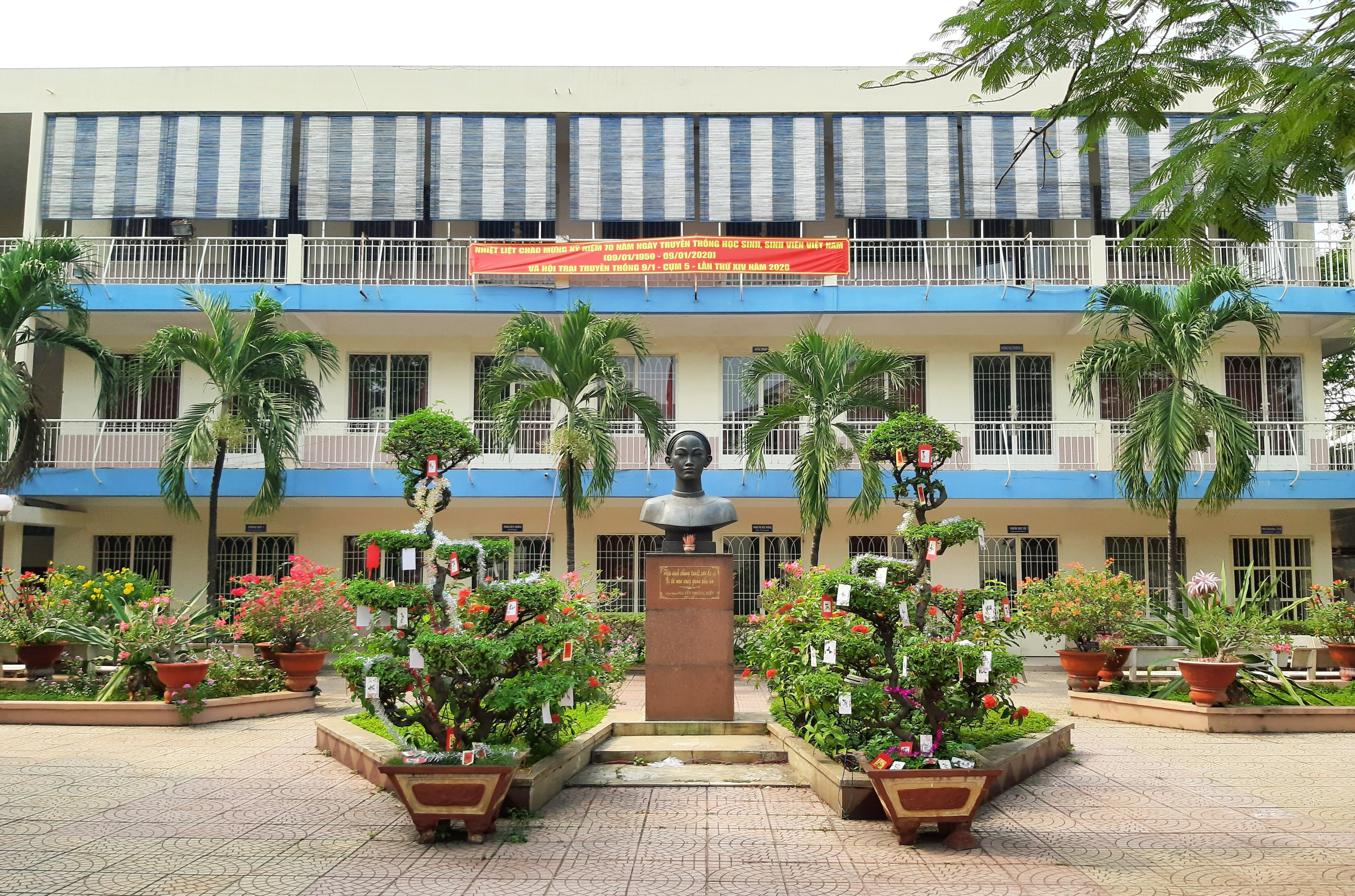
The statue of Nguyễn Thượng Hiền and the office building in the background.

The school covers over 21,000 m² of land and is divided into many blocks. The school now has 58 classrooms with the average number of students per class in academic year 2009-2010 is 42.

=== Functional rooms ===
- Most rooms are equipped with two air-conditioners, LCD TVs and computers to aid the teaching with presentations.
- The Informatics Section with 4 rooms containing 40 computers each.
- 3 laboratories for Chemistry, Physics and Biology.

=== Library ===
The library, which has an area of 300m^{2}, is located behind the Teacher's Hall with over 20,000 books in various fields and 6 attached computers. It has been considered as one of the largest libraries in high schools in Ho Chi Minh City. There is also a foreign language library in the Administrative Block.

=== Multipurpose gymnasium ===
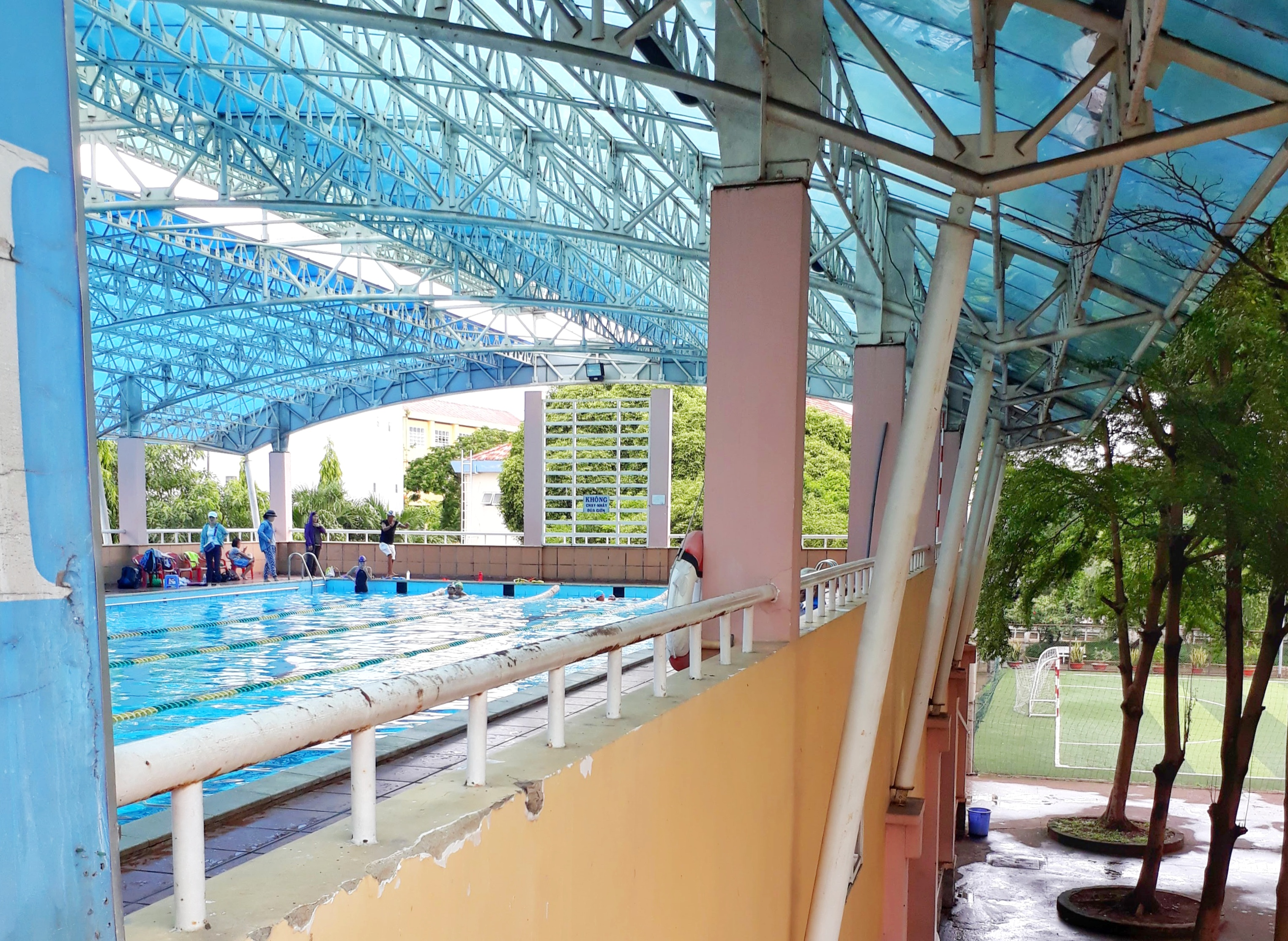
The school's swimming pool

The school's gymnasium has an area of 800m^{2} and is used for physical education. There is also a parking lot in its basement. The swimming pool and soccer field are located next to the gymnasium.

== Principals ==
Year	Principal	Vice Principal
1969-1970	Nguyễn Ngọc Xương	
1970-1975	Nguyễn Tiến Thành	
1977-1979		Lê Thị Mỹ Bích
1978-1980		Lê Thị Phương Ngôn
1978-1982		Văn Đức Kim
1979-1982		Trần Kiết Hùng
1982-1998	Lê Bền	Nguyễn Hoài Chương
1983-2003		Trương Quang Hiệp
1985-1998	Nguyễn Hữu Nghi	Nguyễn Hoài Chương, Trương Quang Hiệp
1998-2003	Nguyễn Hoài Chương	Hồ Cam Thanh, Trương Quang Hiệp
2003-2004	Nguyễn Hoài Chương	Hồ Cam Thanh, Trương Quang Dũng
2004-2012	Hồ Cam Thanh	Trương Quang Dũng, Võ Văn Dũng
2012-2013	Hồ Cam Thanh	Võ Văn Dũng, Trần Thị Phụng
2013-7/2014	Võ Văn Dũng	Trần Thị Phụng
7/2014-3/2018	Võ Văn Dũng	Trần Thị Phụng, Nguyễn Ảnh Nam
3/2018 - 10/2018	Trần Thị Phụng (acting)	Nguyễn Ảnh Nam
10/2018–present	Lâm Triều Nghi	Trần Thị Phụng, Nguyễn Ảnh Nam

== Extra-curricula activities ==
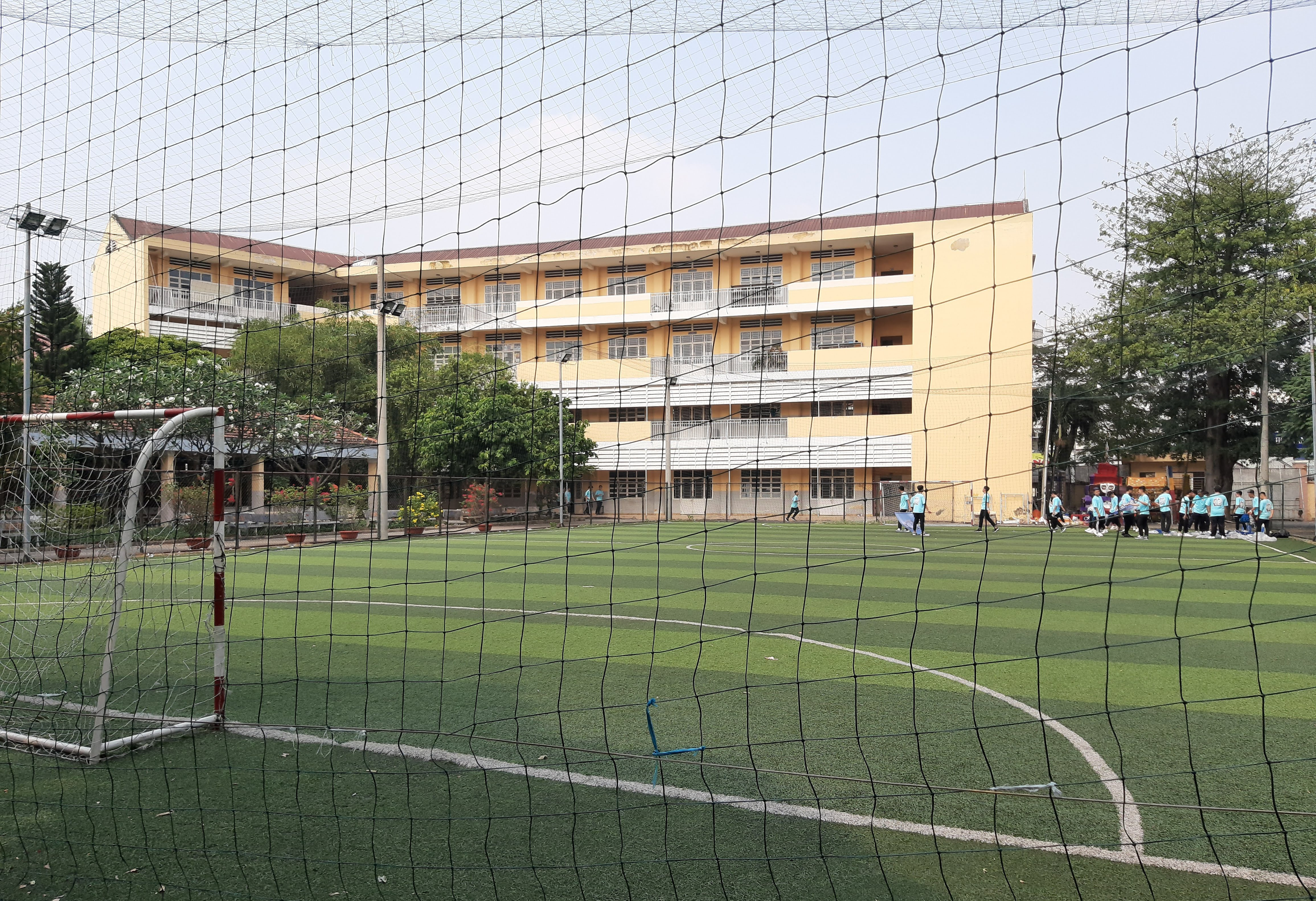
Minifootball field in the school's backyard

There is a wide range of extra-curricula activities, which are compulsory for grade 10 and 11 students, to choose: volleyball, soccer, basketball, swimming, table tennis, martial arts, aerobics, bodybuilding, musical performance, belly dance, Physics-Chemistry experiment, English club and IT club.
