= Côn Lôn =

- Commune
- Interactive map of Côn Lôn
- Coordinates: 22.539127701079394°N 105.46316999822336°E
- Country: Vietnam
- Region: Northeast
- Province: Tuyên Quang
- Established: 16 June 2025
- Administrative headquarters: Trung Mường hamlet

Area
  - Total: 160.76 km^{2} (62.07 sq mi)

Population (2025)
  - Total: 5,734
  - Density: 35/km^{2} (91/sq mi)

Côn Lôn is a mountainous commune in Tuyên Quang province, Vietnam.

== History ==
The area of present-day Côn Lôn Commune was formerly located in Na Hang district, Tuyên Quang province.

On 16 June 2025, the National Assembly of Vietnam adopted Resolution No. 203/2025/QH15 amending and supplementing several articles of the Constitution of the Socialist Republic of Vietnam. Under the resolution, district-level administrative units nationwide ceased to operate from 1 July 2025.

On the same date, the Standing Committee of the National Assembly of Vietnam issued Resolution No. 1684/NQ-UBTVQH15 on the arrangement of commune-level administrative units in Tuyên Quang province in 2025. Under the resolution, the entire area and population of Sinh Long and Côn Lôn communes were merged to form a new commune named Côn Lôn.
