= Đông Du =

Vietnamese political movement

Đông Du (Saigon: [ɗəwŋm ju], Hanoi: [ɗəwŋm zu], journey to the east; Japanese: 東遊) was a Vietnamese political movement founded by Phan Bội Châu at the start of the 20th century that encouraged young Vietnamese to go east to Japan to study, in the hope of training a new era of revolutionary independent activists to rise against French colonial rule. Other notable proponents of Dong Du include Phan Châu Trinh and Prince Cường Để of Nguyễn house. In 1906 there were only 20 students in Japan, but October 1907, there were over 100 students in Japan, more than half from the South.

== History ==
At the beginning of the 20th century, France had suppressed almost all revolutionary movements. Yên Thế Insurrection led by Hoàng Hoa Thám, at the time, had narrowed the scope of operations and fully suppressed in 1913.

In 1903, Phan Bội Châu, a patriotic scholar from Nghệ An traveled through the whole country to contact other scholars to establish a revolutionary party, which later be Duy Tân Hội.

=== The establishment of Duy Tân Hội ===
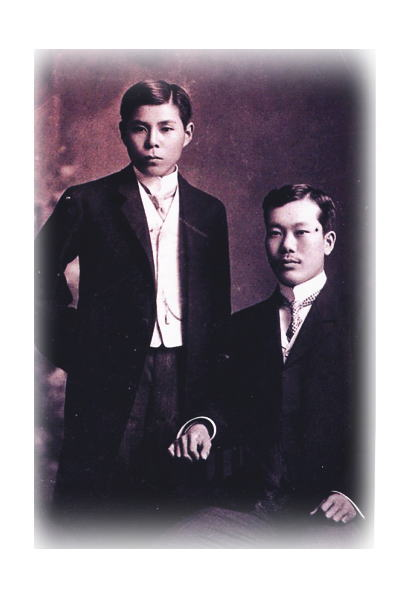
Cường Để (left) and Phan Bội Châu in Japan

Early 1904, after coming back from French Cochinchina, on April 4, Phan Bội Châu, together with Cường Để (one of the descendants of Prince Nguyễn Phúc Cảnh) and around 20 other nationalists met at Nguyễn Thành's house, located in Quảng Nam to establish Duy Tân Hội, a secret revolutionary movement.

After discussion, the association's founding conference set out three immediate tasks, which were:

- Developing the association's power in terms of both human resources and finances.
- Promoting preparations for the uprising and other tasks after the uprising began.
- Determining the policy for seeking help abroad, and how to carry it out.

The above two items were assigned to all members, while the third item was entrusted to Nguyen Thanh and Phan Boi Chau to discuss in secret and then carry it out, without the other members knowing.
