= Phan Bội Châu =

Vietnamese nationalist and revolutionary

- 潘 佩 珠
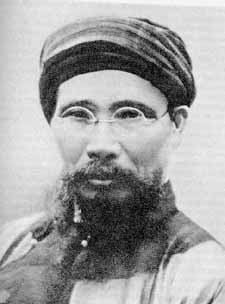
- Châu, c. 1920
- Born: Phan Văn San; 26 December 1867; Sa Nam, Nghệ An Province, Đại Nam
- Died: 29 October 1940 (aged 72); Huế, Annam, French Indochina
- Other names: Hải Thụ, Sào Nam
- Organization(s): Duy Tân Hội, Việt Nam Quang Phục Hội
- Movement: Đông-Du Movement

Phan Bội Châu

Vietnamese name
- Vietnamese: Phan Bội Châu
- Hán-Nôm: 潘佩珠

Phan Bội Châu (Note: Born Phan Văn San, courtesy name Hải Thụ (later changed to Sào Nam) (Vietnamese: [faːn ɓôjˀ cəw]; 26 December 1867 – 29 October 1940) was a Vietnamese nationalist and revolutionary. In 1904, he formed a revolutionary organization called Duy Tân Hội ("Modernization Association") and initiated the Đông Du movement. From 1905 to 1908, he lived in Japan where he wrote political tracts calling for the independence of Vietnam from French colonial rule. After being forced to leave Japan, he moved to China where he was influenced by Sun Yat-sen and gradually shifted his political position from monarchist to democrat. In 1912, he disbanded Duy Tân Hội to form Việt Nam Quang Phục Hội (“Vietnamese Restoration League”), modeled after Sun Yat-sen's republican party. In 1925, French agents seized him in Shanghai. He was convicted of treason and spent the rest of his life under house arrest in Huế.

== Aliases ==
During his career, Phan used several pen names, including Sào Nam (巢 南), Thị Hán (是 漢), Độc Tỉnh Tử (獨 醒 子), Việt Điểu, and Hàn Mãn Tử.

== Early years ==
Phan was born as Phan Văn San (潘 文 珊) in the village of Sa Nam, Nam Đàn District of the northern central province of Nghệ An. His father, Phan Văn Phổ, descended from a poor family of scholars, who had always excelled academically. He spent his first three years in Sa Nam, his mother's village, before the family moved to another village, Đan Nhiệm, his father's home village, also in Nam Đàn District. Until Phan was five, his father was typically away from home, teaching in other villages, so his mother raised him and taught him to recite passages from the Classic of Poetry, from which he absorbed Confucian ethics and virtues.

When Phan was five, his father returned home and he began attending his father's classes, where he studied the Chinese classics, such as the Three Character Classic, which took him just three days to memorize. As a result of his ability to learn quickly, his father decided to move him to further Confucian texts, such as the Analects, which he practiced on banana leaves. In his autobiography, Phan admitted he did not understand the meaning of the text in great detail at the time, but by age six, he was skillful enough to write a variant of the Analects that parodied his classmates, which earned him a caning from his father.

At the time, the central region of Vietnam where his family lived was still under the sovereignty of Emperor Tự Đức, but the southern region had gradually been colonized by Cochinchina campaign in the 1860s. In 1862, Nguyễn dynasty was forced to sign the first Treaty of Saigon that ceded the three east provinces. In 1874, Nguyễn dynasty continued to sign the second Treaty of Saigon that ceded the three west provinces to the French, the whole Nam Kỳ lục-tỉnh (Southern six provinces) became French Cochinchina. In Nghệ-Tĩnh, the Văn Thân movement sprung among the local scholar-gentry with their motto Bình Tây (Pacify the French), and Phan responded at the age of seven by playing Bình Tây game with his classmates, using bamboo guns and lychee bullets. The unrest was enough to prompt the imperial court to bring in troops to quell the opposition to the treaties. Phan's family was not affected by the crackdown, but the movement had a deep impact on him.

When Phan was thirteen, his father sent him to another teacher with a better reputation. Since the family lacked the money for Phan to travel far away, he studied with a local cử nhân graduate who was able to borrow a range of books from wealthier families in the area. In 1883, the French finished the colonization of Vietnam by conquering the northern part of Vietnam, and the country was incorporated into French Indochina. Phan drafted an appeal for "pacifying the French and retrieving the North" (bình Tây thu Bắc). He posted the anonymous appeal calling for the formation of local resistance units at intervals along the main road, but there were no responses and the proclamations were soon torn down. Phan realized no one would listen to a person without the social status ensured by passing mandarin examinations.

In 1884, his mother died and his aging father was growing weaker, forcing Phan to help support the family. In 1885, the Cần Vương movement began its uprising against French rule, hoping to install the boy Emperor Hàm Nghi as the ruler of an independent Vietnam by expelling colonial forces. The imperial entourage fled the palace in Huế and attempted to start the uprising from a military base in Nghệ An. The scholar gentry of the province rose up, and Phan attempted to rally approximately 60 classmates who were prospective examination candidates to join in the uprising. Phan called his new unit the Sĩ tử Cần Vương Đội (Army of Loyalist Examination Candidates) and convinced an older cử nhân graduate to act as its commander. They had just begun to collect money and raw materials to make ad hoc weapons when a French patrol attacked the village and scattered the students. Phan's father forced him to seek out the commander to have the membership list destroyed to avoid French retributions.

With his father growing weaker, Phan decided to keep a low profile to avoid trouble with the French colonials so that he could support his family. He did so by teaching and writing, while still continually preparing for examinations. During this time, he quietly acquired books on military strategy by the likes of Sun Tzu and Đào Duy Từ, the military strategist of the Nguyễn lords who stopped the Trịnh lords with a defensive wall, and Trần Hưng Đạo, the military commander of the Trần dynasty who repelled Mongol invasions of Vietnam in the 13th century. Phan cultivated a small number of his students whom he identified as having abundant pro-independence sentiments. He enthusiastically received visits from Cần Vương visitors and passed on their tales to his students, particularly those concerning Phan Đình Phùng, who led the Cần Vương effort.

Phan failed the regional mandarin exams for a number of years in a row. By the time he was 30, he traveled to Huế to teach, to "improve his contacts" and to obtain some special tutoring in preparation for his next exam attempt. In Huế, Phan quickly made friends with similar political values and beliefs. One friend, Nguyễn Thượng Hiền, introduced him to the unpublished writings of Nguyễn Lộ Trạch, a Vietnamese activist/reformist. This was Phan's first encounter with the Self-Strengthening Movement in China and other major political and military reforms made around the world. After returning to Nghệ An in 1900, Phan passed the regional mandarin exams with the highest possible honors.

== Marriage and family ==
At the age of 22, Phan married Nguyễn Thị Huy (Thái Thị Huy, Thái Thị Huyên), who was from the same village. The union had long been arranged by their parents, who were acquaintances. Phan was the only son in the family, and his wife initially did not bear him any children, so she arranged for him to be married to a second wife Nguyễn Thị Minh (Phạm Thị Minh) so that the family line could be continued. This practice was not uncommon in Confucian families of the time. His second wife bore him a son (Phan Nghi Đệ) and daughter, and his first wife later bore him another son (Phan Nghi Huynh).

When Phan passed the regional examinations in 1900, he was eligible to become a public servant. However, Phan had no intention of pursuing such a career and only wanted the qualification to increase his gravitas in rallying anti-colonial action. With his father dying in the same year, Phan had less family obligations, and decided to travel abroad to pursue his revolutionary activities.

Phan met with his wife only once more following the leaving: when he was pardoned and released from Hỏa Lò Prison more than two decades later. He was then sent to a loose form of house arrest in Huế and the train stopped at Vinh, Nghệ An, Vietnam. On the way, his wife said, “I am very happy. From now on, my only wish is that you will hold to your initial aspiration. Do whatever you like, and do not worry about your wife and children.”

== Activism in Vietnam ==
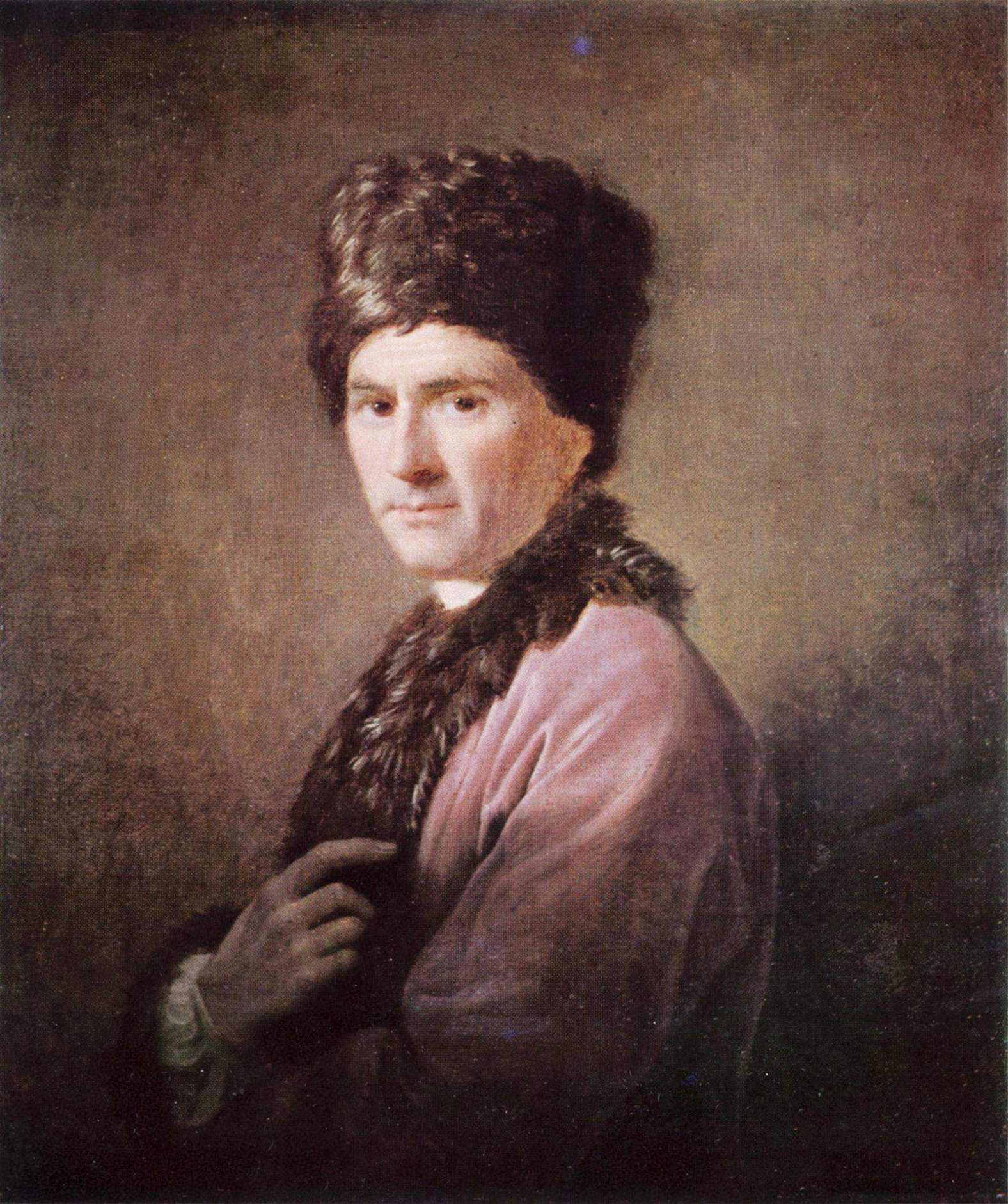
Phan studied the works of Enlightenment philosopher Jean-Jacques Rousseau.

Phan spent the first five years of the 20th century living in Huế and traveling the country. Phan drew up a three-step plan to get the French out of Vietnam. First, he would need to organize remnants of the Cần Vương movement and other sympathizers of the cause. Second, he would need to attain support from the Vietnamese imperial family and the bureaucracy, many of whom had already come to grips with French colonial rule. Finally, he would need to obtain foreign aid, from Chinese or Japanese revolutionaries, to finance the revolution.

It was only later that Phan realized that obtaining independence for Vietnam would be much more difficult than expected. He became familiar with the works of famed European thinkers, such as Voltaire, Rousseau and Darwin. Phan was also influenced by the writings of such Chinese Confucianists as Liang Qichao and Kang Youwei. The European and Chinese works, which had only entered Vietnamese circles a few years later, opened Phan's mind to more expansive thought regarding the struggle for freedom of his people. Liang's Hsin-min ts'ung-pao ("The Renovation of the People") influenced Phan's revolutionary ideas and beliefs, as it criticized the Chinese government and proclaimed that the Chinese people's consciousness needed to be awakened to further the country into the modern era.

Kang, one of the major thinkers that influenced Phan, took the idea of Social Darwinism and discussed the survival of the fittest concept as it applied to nations and ethnic groups. He described the dire outcomes that would face China if the country did not embark on a series of reforms, similar to those faced by the Ottoman Empire and colonial India. He believed that reforms made by Peter the Great and Emperor Meiji were excellent examples of the political restructuring that needed to take place to save China. From Kang's work, Phan realized why Emperor Tự Đức's decision to ignore Nguyễn Trường Tộ's proposed modernization reforms had led to the downfall of Vietnam and had allowed for French rule in Vietnam.

Phan continued to seek support from the scholar-gentry and the bureaucracy serving the French, before shifting his focus to obtaining support from members of the imperial family. Phan had moved to Huế, claiming that he was preparing for the metropolitan imperial examinations, but in actuality, he planned on drumming up support among the various factions of royal family. Phan traveled to Quảng Nam to meet with Nguyễn Thành, also known by courtesy name Tiểu La, a contemporary anti-colonial revolutionary activist who was involved in the Cần Vương movement. Tiểu La suggested that a royal associate of his, Tôn Thất Toại, could help lead the revolution. Phan rejected the offer, but took Tiểu La's advice to seek support from direct descendants of Emperor Gia Long, the founder of the Nguyễn dynasty. These direct descendants were still highly respected by wealthy Mekong Delta landowners who Phan hoped would raise the bulk of the money needed to finance the revolution.

== Vietnam Modernization Association ==
By the spring of 1903, Phan had found a perfect candidate to lead the revolution: Prince Cường Để, a direct descendant of Gia Long's eldest son, Prince Cảnh. Cường Để's descendants had long been dissociated from the emperor and his family since the early 19th century. Cường Để's father was personally sought by Phan Đình Phùng to take Hàm Nghi's place and lead a popular revolt against the French in the 1880s, but he declined. By 1894, he suggested that his son, then 12 years old, could be the new face of the revolution. This plan was never executed as Phan Đình Phùng died in January 1896. Cường Để changed the course of his life and began studying history, economics and geography and thought admiringly of the heroic achievements of Trần Hưng Đạo, Zhuge Liang, Toyotomi Hideyoshi, Saigō Takamori, Cavour, Otto von Bismarck, George Washington, and Abraham Lincoln.

After getting Cường Để to support the revolutionary cause, Phan wrote his first significant work, Lưu Cầu Huyết lệ Tân thư (Letter from the Ryukyu written in Tears of Blood). He argued that independence in Vietnam could only be achieved "through a transformation and revitalization of national character". The book was moderately successful amongst the Vietnamese populaces and received attention from other nationalists like Trần Quý Cáp and Phan Châu Trinh. However, many mandarins were reluctant to publicly support Phan's ideas, and as a result, he came to realize that he couldn't rely on the bureaucratic elite to support his cause.

Phan created the Việt Nam Duy Tân Hội (Vietnam Modernization Association) in 1904; Cường Để led the association as its president, while Phan served as general secretary. Despite its growing member base, Duy Tân Hội struggled financially. Phan had hoped to obtain financial assistance from China, but the country was forced to abandon its suzerain relationship with Vietnam after the 1884–85 Sino-French War. Phan and Cường Để decided to seek aid from Japan, which had recently won a war against Russia, had successfully imposed reforms and seemed more inclined to help out revolutionaries in a nearby Asian country. Phan was selected to visit Japan to secure the funds needed to sustain Duy Tân Hội. Phan did not speak Japanese and had no contacts in Japan, so he chose a companion, Tăng Bạt Hổ, a former commander of the Cần Vương movement, who fled to Guangxi, Guangdong after the failure of the movement, relied on Liu Yongfu in Taiwan, then was hiding in Thailand after the defeat of Liu in Taiwan. Phan and Tăng arrived at Hongkong in March 1905. After failing to meet Cen Chunxuan, viceroy of Liangguang at the time, Phan switched to seek help from Liang Qichao, who was living in Japan since being exiled years earlier.

Liang introduced Phan to many prominent politicians, including Ōkuma Shigenobu, a well-liked statesman who had previously served as Prime Minister of Japan for a few months in 1898. Phan asked Okuma for financial assistance to fund the activities of Vietnamese revolutionaries. In his letter to Okuma, Phan stated that Japan should be obligated to help Vietnam since both countries were of the "same race, same culture, and same continent". Japan could also promote its interests in Vietnam and prevent French and Russian expansion into China. However, Phan was unsuccessful in procuring aid from the Japanese. The Japanese government did not want to damage its own relationship with France, while opposition party members promised financial aid to Vietnamese students wishing to study in Japan, but also advised Phan not to start a revolutionary movement until Japan was more willing to help the cause.

In Guangxi and Guangdong, the Vietnamese revolutionaries arranged alliances with the Kuomintang by marrying Vietnamese women to Chinese officers. Their children were at an advantage since they could speak both languages and they worked as agents for the revolutionaries and spread revolutionary ideologies across borders. This intermarriage between Chinese and Vietnamese was viewed with alarm by the French. Phan's revolutionary network practiced this extensively; additionally, Chinese merchants also married Vietnamese women, and provided funds and help.

== Early writings ==
Frustrated by the Japanese response, Phan turned to Liang, who explained to Phan it was naïve to expect financial assistance from the Japanese. The Vietnamese people would have to look only within Vietnam for support and financial backing. Liang told Phan that he could best serve the cause by writing and distributing pamphlets advocating for the revolution to rally support from the Vietnamese and others abroad. Phan took Liang's advice very seriously and immediately began to publish materials to obtain support for the revolutionary cause.

These writings, perhaps the most widely recognized of Phan's works, include: Việt Nam vong quốc sử (History of the Loss of Vietnam), Tân Việt Nam (The new Vietnam; 1907), Ai Việt điếu Điền (Grief over Vietnam and Condolence for Yunnan; 1907), Hải ngoại Huyết thư (Letter Inscribed in Blood from Abroad; 1907), Việt Nam quốc sử khảo (An Inquiry into the history of Vietnam; 1908). All were initially written in Classical Chinese and then translated to Quốc ngữ, upon which they were smuggled into Vietnam. These works, most notably Việt Nam vong quốc sử, were critical in intensifying the nationalist fervor in the country.

=== Việt Nam vong quốc sử ===
Liang published Phan's 1905 work Việt Nam vong quốc sử (History of the Loss of Vietnam) and intended to distribute it in China and abroad, but also to smuggle it into Vietnam. Phan wanted to rally people to support the cause for Vietnamese independence; the work is regarded as one of the most important books in the history of Vietnam's anticolonialism movement. The book helped revive the name "Vietnam", which was not commonly used at the time.

The book is noted for its negative assessment of the response of the Nguyễn dynasty in the 19th century to the colonial challenges facing Vietnam and the failure to modernize, with the Nguyễn instead turning to ultra-orthodox conservative Confucianism. The book presents strident and emotive memorials to the key figures of the Cần Vương movement of the late 1880s and early 1890s, led by mandarins such as Tôn Thất Thuyết and Phan Đình Phùng, who led guerrillas against the French. The Cần Vương attempted to overthrow the French rule and establish the boy emperor Hàm Nghi as the ruler of an independent Vietnam. The book also analyzes the French social and economic policies in Vietnam, which it regards as oppression. In the book, Phan argues for the establishment of a nationwide pro-independence front with seven factions or interested groups with a specific motivation to fight the French colonial authorities.

The book is written in a style that differed from the prevailing writing technique and structure of the scholar gentry of the time. The scholar gentry under the Confucian education system fostered by the classical imperial examinations were molded by their study and memorization of classical Chinese poetry and literature. As such, the literary style tended to be poetic, indirect and metaphorical, relying on allusions and imagery to depict an idea. Phan eschewed this traditional style to write in a direct, ordinary prose style, especially in his analytical and argumentative sections. The book precipitated a new style of writing among scholar gentry revolutionaries, who later tended to use a more direct style.

The book created a reaction in China, sparking follow-up essays by Chinese writers who were taken aback by the Phan's description of Vietnamese life under French colonial rule. It generated gloomy pieces by Chinese writers who predicted that their nation would suffer a similar fate if they failed to modernize. One such Chinese response later became a teaching text at the Tonkin Free School in Hanoi, a school run by Phan's contemporaries to promote the independence movement. However, Phan did not receive much of a reaction in terms of aid towards his independence efforts, since the book made Chinese readers worry about their own future. The book had a much better reception among Vietnamese readers. Phan and a colleague, Đặng Tử Kính, left Japan for the first time in August 1905, carrying 50 copies of the book that were distributed throughout Vietnam, after which further copies were made inside the country. Phan's direct writing style, without the use of allegories, upset traditionalists but made the book more accessible to literate people who had not been trained in classical literature.

== Đông-Du Movement ==
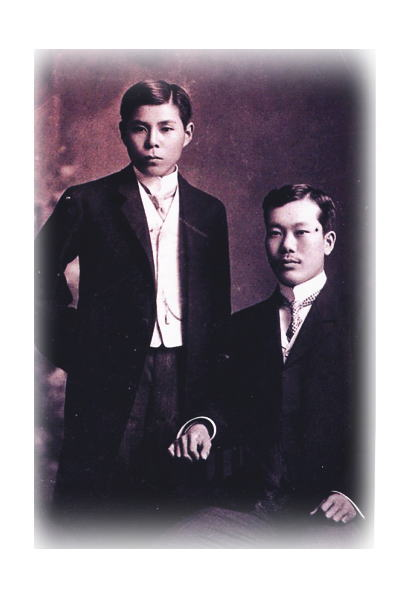
Phan (right) with Cường Để, circa 1907.

In 1905, the Vietnam Modernization Association agreed to send Phan to Japan to get Japanese military assistance or weapons. The Duy Tân Hội had turned more radical after Japan's victory over Russia led to the popular belief that Japan would soon turn its attention to ridding Asia of the western imperialist powers in general. However, Phan soon realized that Japanese military aid would not be possible, and turned his attention to using Japan as a base to train and educate young Vietnamese students, by starting the Đông Du (Visit the East) Society. The number of Vietnamese students sent to Japan for training peaked at 200 in 1908. However, due to pressure from the French government, especially after the signing of the Franco-Japanese Treaty of 1907, Japan declared Phan to be persona non grata and expelled him in 1909.

== After Đông-Du ==
In 1909, after being deported from Japan, Phan went to Hong Kong with Cường Để. There, he made plans to raise money and bring to Thailand the Vietnamese students who had studied in Japan, but had now been dispersed. He had previously had the foresight to establish a base in Thailand.

But instead he received news of an armed uprising in Vietnam, led by Hoàng Hoa Thám (Đề Hoàng Yên-Thế). So he assembled his comrades in Hong Kong, and sent two people to Japan to buy 500 of the Arisaka Type 30 rifles. But after buying the weapons to support the uprising with, they could not afford to hire a ship to smuggle the rifles into Vietnam. So, in July, Phan went to Thailand to ask their government to help with the smuggling. The foreign minister refused, as such direct support would spark a major diplomatic incident with France were it to leak. So he had to return to Hong Kong and wait for the money needed for smuggling. The money never arrived, and news arrived that his fundraising organizer - Đặng Thái Thân, also known by courtesy name Ngư Hải - was dead, and that the uprising was going badly. Phan donated 480 of the rifles to the forces of Sun Yat-sen. He then tried to smuggle the remaining 20 of the rifles via Thailand, disguised as first-class luggage. This attempt failed. He spent the first half of 1910 begging on the street, selling his books, and spending most of his money on alcohol. This went on until he met an elderly woman, Chu Bá Linh (Chu sư-thái), who took the entire movement into her house. Funds arrived and he planned to move to Thailand. He arrived in Thailand in November 1910, and all his students and followers who could follow him took up farming there.

== Vietnam Restoration League ==
The Wuchang Uprising occurred in China on 10 October 1911; it quickly spread and declared itself the Republic of China. This greatly inspired Phan, since he had many friends among the Chinese revolutionaries. Phan thought this new regime would fix all that was wrong with the old China, and unite with Japan to defeat the Europeans and build a strong Asia. Leaving the farm in the hands of his comrades, he went to China to visit his friends there.

The old Vietnam Modernization Association had become effectively defunct, with its members scattered. A new organization needed to be formed, with a new agenda inspired by the 1911 Revolution. A large meeting was held in late March 1912. They agreed to form a new group, the Việt Nam Quang Phục Hội (Vietnam Restoration League). Cường Để was made president and chairman; Phan was vice-president.

People voted to campaign for democracy instead of a monarchy, despite strong objections of people from southern Vietnam. The organization's sole purpose was to kick out the French and establish a democratic republic. However they had no funds and had great difficulty getting revolutionary leaflets into Vietnam. Also, the new Chinese government was too busy and would not help the movement with anything other than allowing Vietnamese comrades into its education and training system. The Việt Nam Quang Phục Hội came up with a proposed flag design. Previously, Vietnam never had a flag, only banners to represent royalty. Their flag idea had 5 five-pointed stars, arranged in a square with a star in the middle. It symbolized the five regions of Vietnam. The national flag had red stars on a yellow background, and the military flag had a red background with white stars. The yellow represented their race, the red represented fire which represented their location to the south of China (see I Ching), and the white represented the metal of their weapons. They also created a book on military strategy and regulations for their army. They even printed their own currency, which they agreed to honour when, or rather "if", they attained power. If they won they could easily pay people back, and if they lost it wouldn't cost them anything. The "money" was printed in a similar way to the Chinese paper notes.

They also formed an organisation called the Chấn-Hoa Hưng-Á Hội (Association for the Revitalization of China). It was dedicated to getting support from China for independence movements in smaller Asian countries, starting with Vietnam of course. Using a medical centre as a front, and a fancy office they managed to create the false impression that they were a huge successful organisation. They got hundreds of people to join, and sold a huge amount of their made-up currency. They changed some of the leadership positions of the Việt-Nam Quang-Phục Hội to allow the Chinese to take part. However, they could not get enough money to buy more weapons until they had proved themselves with a military attack of some sort. Everyone said they needed something big and explosive because the people of Vietnam were short on patience. So Phan sent five people with a few grenades to the three regions of Vietnam. The grenades they sent to the North were used on a minor target, the governor of Thái Bình province, two officers and a French restaurateur. They were meant to be used at the mandarin examinations when all the officials would be gathered. Those they sent to the centre via Thailand did not make it to Vietnam at the time, and they had to throw their grenades away. Those that they sent to the south were used on some Vietnamese. The attacks in the North enraged the French, and they demanded Phan be arrested, but the Chinese government refused. But the value of Phan's special currency dropped dramatically after the failure.

They had no money, so they decided to trick a pharmaceutical company in Japan into providing many expensive drugs for them on credit. They then closed down their medical centre and didn't pay their debt. But their membership slowly dwindled, and the difficulty of getting into Vietnam increased. And changes in the government of their Chinese province made things difficult. And they had to close their office and send their comrades away.

== Vietnam during World War I ==
By 1914, Phan was arrested by the Chinese authorities and thrown in jail on suspicion of helping rival Chinese authorities. The intervention of the Chinese minister for the army stopped them from killing him or handing him over to the French, but he was kept in prison for almost four years, until 1917. In prison he wrote many biographies, including his own, and other books. World War I began shortly thereafter. The country remained a member of the French Empire, and many Vietnamese fought in World War I. Numerous anti-colonial revolts occurred in Vietnam during the war, all easily suppressed by the French.

While he was in prison, Phan organised some of his comrades to meet with the German government in Thailand. They donated a large amount of money and promised more if a spectacular action could be done in Vietnam against the French. The comrades attempted an action but failed completely, wasting all the money. After his release, Phan traveled to Beijing and to Japan, and then to various parts of China trying to get back into Vietnam. When he eventually got to the border of Yunnan Province and Vietnam, he discovered that World War I was over and his plans of using it to help defeat the French were hopeless. Phan wandered around China for years after this without accomplishing anything significant. He pondered collaborating with the French, who were now ruled by the Socialist Party (France), and he wrote a booklet about why collaboration with the French would be good. He later changed his mind and blamed this thinking on Phan Bá Ngọc, who was accused by Phan for being a collaborator with the French.

== Relations with the socialists ==
At the start of 1921, Phan studied socialism and the Soviet Union in the hope of gaining assistance from the Soviet Union or socialist groups. He translated a book called "An Account of the Russian Revolution", by Tatsuji Fuse, into Chinese. He then went to Beijing to meet with Soviet representatives Grigori Voitinsky and Lạp tiên sinh. Lạp said that the Soviet Union would educate, train, and pay for any Vietnamese students Phan wanted to send, provided they would engage in social revolution and teach socialism in Vietnam afterwards. Lạp was keen to hear more about the political situation in Vietnam, since Phan was the first Vietnamese revolutionary to come into contact with them. Lạp requested Phan to write a book in English about the situation, but Phan was unable to do so as he spoke no English.

Later in life, Phan Bội Châu remarked that advocating for class struggle in Vietnam was "extremely foolish". He did not oppose socialism, but believed that such a theory could not yet be put into practice in the country at that time; he condemned those who exploited socialism to undermine unity and destroy the national spirit. Indochinese Communist Party members condemned Phan as a traitor, while other commentators defended him as a nationalist revolutionary and reformer, in a public display of hostility in 1939.

== Final years ==
In 1925, Phan arrived in Shanghai on what he thought was a short trip on behalf of his movement. He was to meet with Hồ Chí Minh, who at that time used the name Lý Thụy, one of Hồ's many aliases. Hồ had invited Phan to come to Guangzhou to discuss matters of common interest. Hồ was in Guangzhou at the Soviet Embassy, purportedly as a Soviet citizen working as a secretary, translator, and interpreter. In exchange for money, Hồ allegedly informed the French police of Phan's imminent arrival. Phan was arrested by French agents and transported back to Hanoi.

This is disputed by Sophie Quinn-Judge and Duncan McCargo, who argued that this is likely propaganda invented by anti-communist authors, considering that Lâm Đức Thụ's reports showed that the French already had all the information they needed from their own spies. Also, according to Quinn-Judge and McCargo, Hồ was rapidly gaining supporters from the "best elements" of the Vietnamese nationalist movement to his ideas, thus having no motivation to eliminate Phan, who considered Hồ more as a successor than a competitor. Thus, Hồ had plenty of reasons to support such a respected activist as a figurehead for his movement.

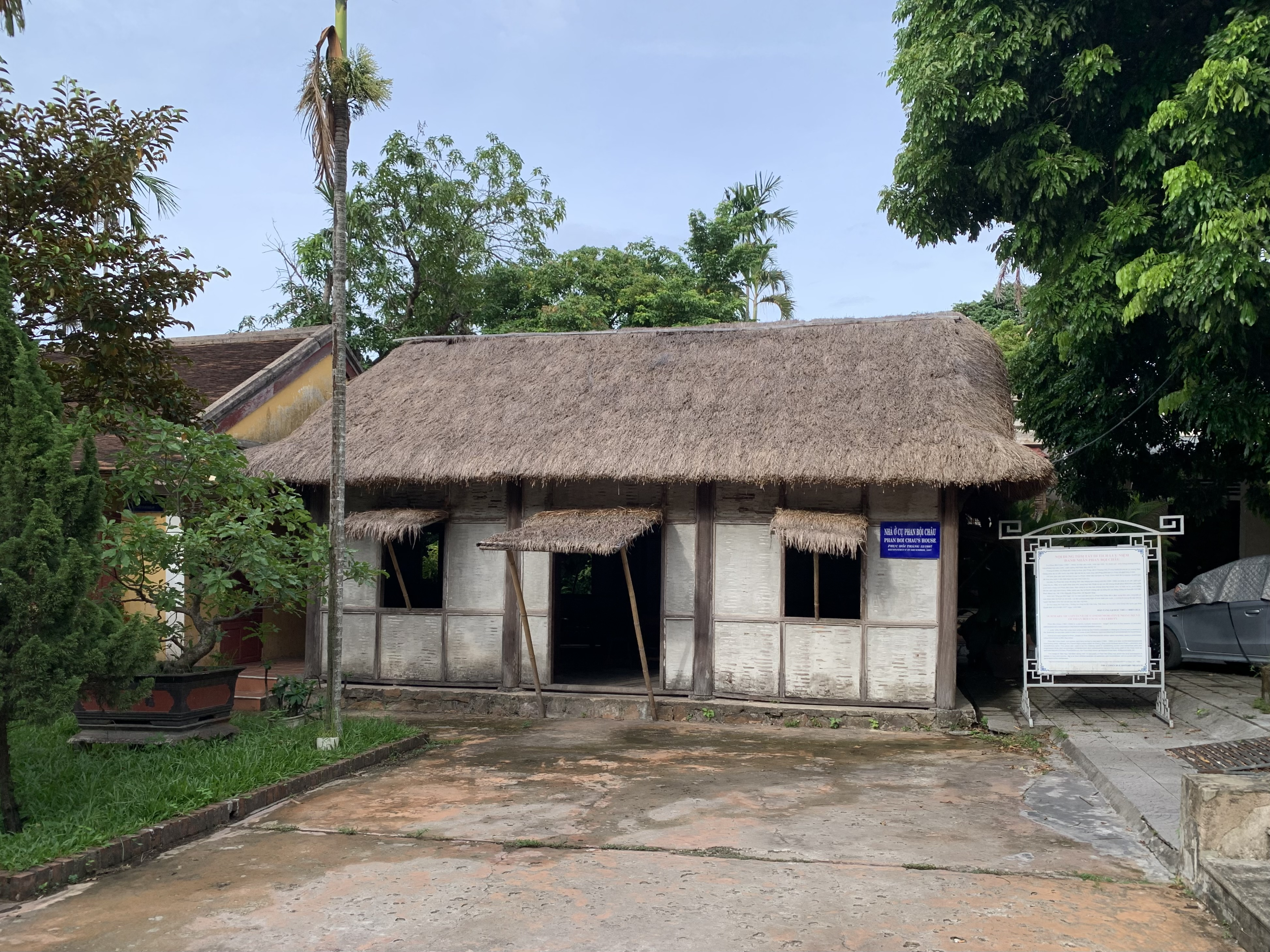
Phan Bội Châu's House in Bến Ngự, Huế, where he spent his last fifteen years.

When he was transported back to Hanoi, he was held in Hỏa Lò Prison. At first, the French authorities did not release his real name in order to avoid public disturbances, but it quickly leaked out who he was. A criminal trial followed, with the charges going back to 1913 when he had been sentenced to death in absentia. The charges included incitement to murder and supplying an offensive weapon used to commit murder in two incidents, which had resulted in the deaths of a Vietnamese governor on 12 April 1913 and of two French majors on 28 April 1913. The court sentenced Phan to penal servitude for life. He was released from prison on 24 December 1925 by Governor General Alexandre Varenne, in response to widespread public protest.

On 25 December 1925, Phan left Hanoi to arrive in Huế with Ngô Đức Kế. During this trip, Phan visited Nghệ An, Hà Tĩnh and Quảng Bình to meet his family and supporters. On 16 February 1926, Phan left Quảng Bình and arrived in Huế, and there became a prisoner in house arrest in Bến Ngự for the rest of his life.

Phan Bội Châu died on 29 October 1940, about a month after Japan invaded northern Vietnam.

== Works ==
- Việt Nam vong quốc sử (History of the Loss of Vietnam) was written in 1905 while Phan was in Japan. This book was smuggled in Vietnam under the French domination period, and also incorporated into Liang Qichao's Collected Works of Yinbingshi (Chinese: 饮冰室合集).
- Việt Nam quốc sử khảo (An Inquiry into the history of Vietnam) was written in 1908, first published in 1909 in Japan. Việt Nam quốc sử khảo summarizes 4000-year history of Vietnam from Hùng kings to emperor Tự Đức, focus on the most typical heroes and heroines who fighting against foreign invaders, as well as the biggest territory gains and losses.
- Việt Nam nghĩa liệt sử (History of the patriots died heroically for the just cause of Vietnam) first published in 1918 in Shanghai, with Đặng Tử Mẫn and Nguyễn Thượng Hiền. This work is a collection of over 50 short stories about members of Cần Vương, Duy Tân and Đông Du movements, who sacrificed their lives for Vietnam's independence from 1906 to 1917, begins with Tăng Bạt Hổ and ends with Lương Lập Nham.
- Ngục trung thư (Prison Notes) was written in 1913 while Phan was put in jail and facing a death sentence due to a deal between the Liangguang governor and the French Indochina governor. This work was completed just in a few days and has discrepancies with Niên biểu in some important events of the Đông-Du movement.
- Văn tế Nguyễn Thượng Hiền (Funeral oration for Nguyễn Thượng Hiền) written in 1925 when Phan got the news of Nguyễn's death in China.
- Văn tế Phan Chu Trinh (Funeral oration for Phan Chu Trinh) written in 1926 for the memorial ceremony for Phan Chu Trinh in Huế.
- Phan Bội Châu niên biểu (Year to Year Activities) was clandestinely written sometimes during his house arrest in Huế (1925–1940). The basic manuscripts were in Classical Chinese. The first Quốc ngữ edition was published under the title Tự phán (Self Judgment) by Tâm Tâm thư xã, copyright by Phan Nghi Đệ in 1946. The second Quốc ngữ edition was translated by Tôn Quang Phiệt and Phạm Trọng Điềm, published in 1956, reissued in 1957.

== Legacy and memory ==
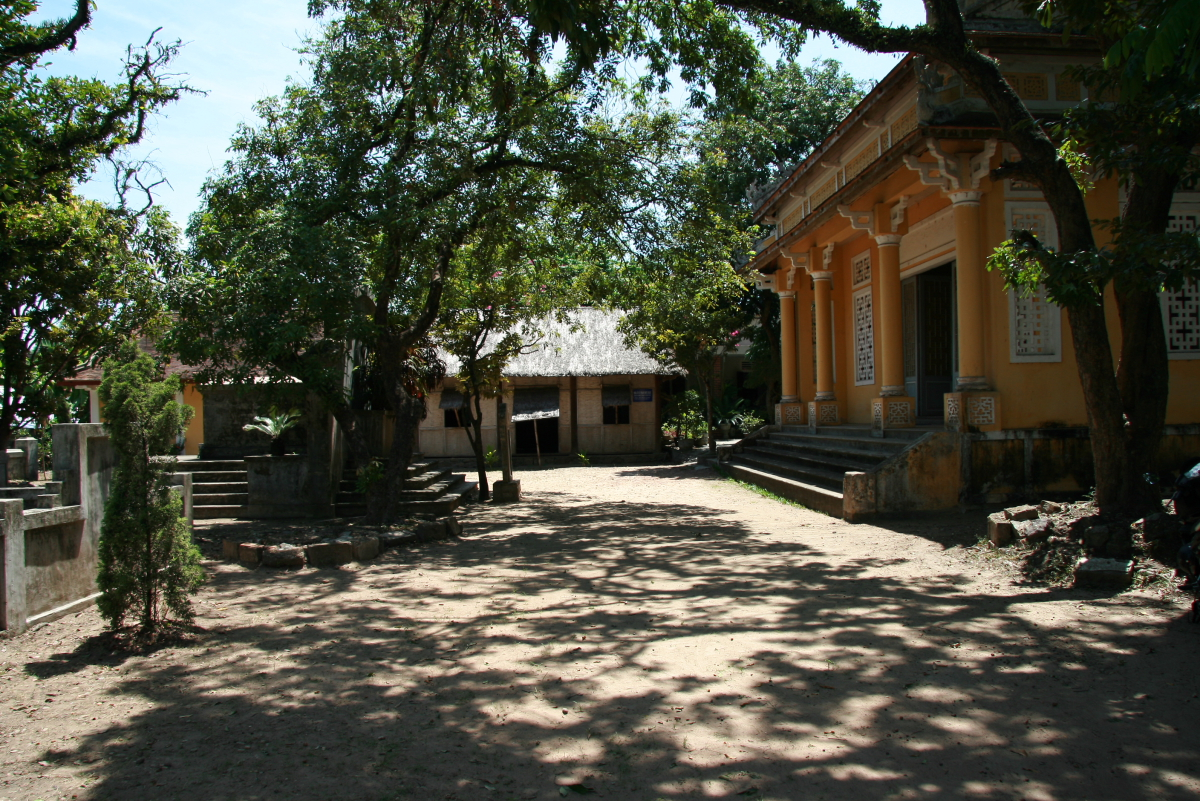
Phan Bội Châu's tomb, temple, bamboo house, and artifacts gallery in Huế

After Phan's death, with support from compatriots throughout the country, Huỳnh Thúc Kháng - one of his closest companions - led the effort to build his tomb and temple between late 1940 and early 1941. The Phan Bội Châu memorial site in Huế, which comprises his house, tomb and temple with around 150 artifacts and documents about his life and revolutionary activities, became a national relic in 1990.

The Phan Bội Châu memorial site in Nam Đàn district became a special national relic since 2016. The relic area consists of two clusters: the cluster of relics in Đan Nhiệm village and the cluster of relics in Sa Nam village. In 1997, an additional gallery was built there with support from Japan. In 2017, the additional gallery was rearranged, complemented and is now home to hundreds of artifacts.

Most cities in Vietnam have major streets named after Phan Bội Châu.
