= Việt Nam Quang Phục Hội =

Restoration League of Vietnam Việt Nam Quang Phục Hội 越南光復會
- Abbreviation: VNQPH
- President: Cường Để
- General Secretary: Phan Bội Châu
- Representative of Tonkin: Nguyễn Thượng Hiền
- Representative of Annam: Phan Bội Châu
- Representative of Cochinchina: Nguyễn Thần Hiến
- Military Service Commissioner: Hoàng Trọng Mậu; Lương Ngọc Quyến
- Founded: March 1912; 114 years ago
- Dissolved: May 1925; 101 years ago
- Headquarters: Guangzhou, China
- Armed Wing: Restoration Army (Quang Phục Quân)
- Peripheral organization: Chấn Hoa Hưng Á Hội
- Ideology: Vietnamese nationalism Three Principles of the People
- Colors
- Slogan: "Defeat the French invaders, restore Vietnam, establish the Republic of Vietnam" (Vietnamese: "Đánh đuổi giặc Pháp, khôi phục Việt Nam, thành lập Việt Nam Dân Quốc")

Party flag

The national flag of the Vietnamese Restoration League according to the book, Tự Phán, by Phan Bội Châu

The military standard of the Vietnam Restoration League, described by the book, Tự Phán, by Phan Bội Châu

The Việt Nam Quang Phục Hội (Hán-Nôm: 越南光復會; Vietnamese: [vìət naːm kwaːŋ fùkp hôjˀ], Restoration League of Vietnam or Restoration Society of Vietnam or VNQPH, was a nationalist republican militant revolutionary organization of Vietnam that was active in the 1910s, under the leadership of Phan Bội Châu and Prince Cường Để. Formed in March 1912, its objective was to overthrow French colonial rule in Vietnam and establish a democratic republic. The organization failed to gain momentum, crippled by arrests of its members, then was dissolved to form the Việt Nam Quốc Dân Đảng in 1924.

== History ==
The formation of Quang Phục Hội came after a meeting in March 1912 in the southern Chinese city of Canton. The meeting brought together the remnants of the Duy Tân Hội (Reformation Society) which had been the leading revolutionary organization since the start of the 20th century. It had a monarchist bent, but had lost direction. The new organization was patterned after the Chinese republican Tongmenghui. Its stated aim was to "drive out the French bandits, restore Vietnam, establish a democratic republic".

== Democracy vs Monarchy ==
The group debated whether a democratic republican model or a monarchy should be the objective. Phan cited Rousseau's arguments in advocating a republic, asserting that democracy was becoming a stronger force in China since the 1911 revolution, especially among those Chinese who could assist them. Phan gained support from colleagues from northern and central Vietnam, including Nguyễn Thượng Hiền. On the other hand, the southerners, who tended to be more conservative and supportive of Prince Cường Để, a direct descendant of Emperor Gia Long, founder of the Nguyễn dynasty, were more inclined towards a return of the monarchy.

== Organization ==
According to Phan's account, a majority of the participants agreed to make Cường Để the President of the newly formed group. Phan was named vice president, while ministries were created, with a delegate from each of Vietnam's three regions in each ministry. The most important of these was the "deliberative ministry", with Nguyễn Thượng Hiền, Phan Bội Châu and Nguyễn Thần Hiến representing the northern, central and southern regions respectively. The various military, financial and propaganda tasks were allocated, and the group dispersed. Some members went back to Vietnam while others stayed in the border provinces of Yunnan and Guangxi along the Chinese border with Vietnam. Phan spent most of his time fundraising. This was an urgent matter, since his usual financial advisor, Lý Tuệ, had been jailed in Vietnam by French authority and funding from Vietnam was beginning to dwindle. Phan decided to raise funds by issuing large numbers of Quang Phục Hội "military bonds". The group promised to reimburse the investors within two years, assuring the purchasers that they would come to power.

== Flags ==
Quang Phục Hội proposed a flag design. Vietnam had never had a national flag, only banners to represent royalty. Their flag consisted of five, red, five-pointed stars, on a yellow background, to symbolise the "yellow" race.

The military flag had a red background with five white stars, which represented the three regions of Vietnam, along with Laos and Cambodia. The red background on the military flag represented fire, indicating their location to the south of China according to wuxing, and the white represented the metal of their weapons, implying the destruction of the enemy.

== Military ==
Plans were made for the creation of a Restoration Army (Quang Phục Quân) to be led by students who had been trained in China. Phan, along with Hoàng Trọng Mậu created a training manual on military strategy that included information on ideology, disciplinary procedure, ranks and pay rates. However, these plans were never put in place as the army never materialised.

== Chinese support ==
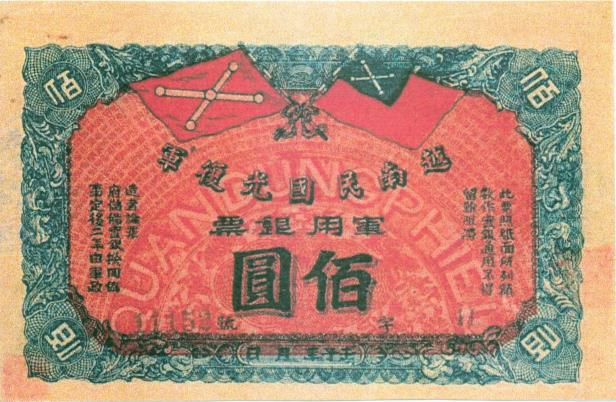
A revolutionary bond issued by the Việt Nam Quang Phục Hội in 1912.

In April, Phan traveled to Nanking and sought an audience with then temporary Chinese President Sun Yat-sen asking for help from his ideological counterpart. However, Sun was busy with his newly formed republic and could only meet Phan for a few minutes before delegating the matter to associate Huang Hsing. Huang was happy to support Phan on principle, but let him know that the new Chinese government was in no position to give substantial help. Huang recommended that Phan send Vietnamese students to study in China for a decade or so to build up his movement, but Phan had experienced the same thing in Japan before and was dispirited by the prospect. However, he accepted the education scheme and began to arrange for students to come to study at Chinese military academies.

They also formed an organisation, Chấn Hoa Hưng Á Hội (Invigorate China, Revive Asia Society), a friendship society designed to garner support for the Quang Phục Hội. Phan rented a large headquarters in Canton and went about promoting the organisation and predicting that the revolutionaries would soon experience success in Vietnam. He wrote and distributed a proclamation, depicting China as the model for all of Asia and hailing a new strategy to expel European authorities from various countries, starting with Vietnam, then Burma and India, which were under British rule.

During the first month, around two hundred Chinese joined the organisation, which raised substantial money from bond sales. Quang Phục Hội changed some of its leadership positions to allow Chinese to take part. The provincial Chinese governor of the area was a sympathiser and allowed it to happen.

== Attacks ==
Phan knew that he would need results to sustain the momentum of the financial and political aid from his Chinese supporters. So he made plans for attacks inside Vietnam. With only a token in-country organisation, they were initially only able to engage in rhetoric, passing death sentences on the Governor-General of French Indochina Albert Sarraut, and on the collaborator mandarin Hoàng Cao Khải, known for his hand in the demise of the leading Cần Vương revolutionary leader Phan Đình Phùng. Phan sent small teams into the three regions of Vietnam on assassination missions, attempting to perpetrate killings like that of the Japanese colonial official Itō Hirobumi by Korean nationalists. The first plot, to kill Sarraut in November 1912, failed. Later on 13 April 1913, they killed Nguyen Duy Han, the governor of Thái Bình Province. Two weeks later, they blew up two French colonels at the Hotel Hanoi.

However, the publicity and momentum caused by the attacks were outweighed by the French response. The authorities rounded up 254 people, executing seven and imprisoning 54. These decimated the organisation inside Vietnam. The French responded by pressuring China to clamp down on the group inside Chinese territory. By this time, the bonds were no longer generating much revenue and Chinese support and interest was beginning to dwindle.

== Demise ==
Early in 1913, Phan held a meeting with around one hundred activists, and it was decided that Phan and Mai Lão Bạng would stay in Canton to try to revive interest and support among the Chinese. Another group was sent to British Hong Kong to build an explosives factory, while others continued to travel back into Vietnam to attempt assassinations and bombings. The result was basically that Quang Phục Hội dissolved. The Hong Kong branch, led by Nguyễn Thần Hiến, was captured by the British police, while other teams along the Chinese border and in Siam were captured and turned over to the French.

== Legacy ==
The Quang Phục Hội never gained strong position within Vietnam, but its ideas did were adopted by later independence movements. Hoàng Trọng Mậu wrote a proclamation for distribution in Vietnam that elaborated their views. Quang Phục Hội laid the blame for the colonisation of the country at the feet and cowardice of the Nguyễn Dynasty. The piece clearly proclaimed that the Vietnamese people as a whole were the owners of the country, not a given royal family and said that if Vietnam was to be restored to independence, it was to be through the efforts of the whole of Vietnamese society. They declared that a democratic republic was necessary, the first time that the term was used in Vietnamese.

== Sources ==
- Marr, David G. (1970). Vietnamese anticolonialism, 1885–1925. Berkeley, California: University of California. ISBN 0-520-01813-3.
