= Cường Để =

Vietnamese revolutionary

- 彊㭽
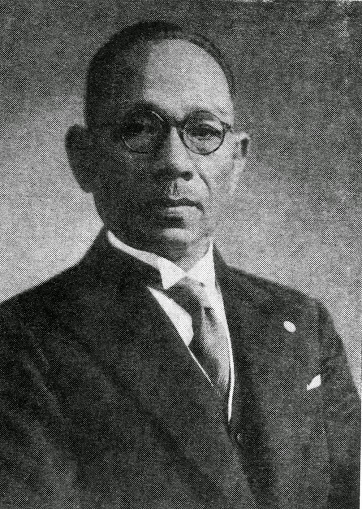
- External marquis Cường Để at Japan. Picture was taken by Nguyễn Đắc Xuân.
- Born: Nguyễn Phước Dân; 11 January 1882; Huế, Annam
- Died: 5 April 1951 (aged 69); Tokyo, Japan
- Known for: Vietnamese revolutionary

Cường Để (彊㭽, IPA: [kɨ̂əŋ ɗe᷉]; born Nguyễn Phúc Dân (chữ Hán: 阮福民); 11 January 1882 - 5 April 1951) was an early 20th-century Vietnamese revolutionary and nationalist who, along with Phan Bội Châu, unsuccessfully tried to liberate Vietnam from French colonial occupation.

Cường Để was a royal relative of the Nguyễn dynasty and, according to the rule of primogeniture, was the heir of the dynasty, directly issued from the line of first-born descendants of Emperor Gia Long and his son Prince Cảnh. He was officially an "external marquis" (Kỳ Ngoại hầu).

== Study in Japan ==
Prince Cường Để went in secret to Japan under the name of Minami Kazuo (南一雄) at the end of 1905, leaving a pregnant wife and two young sons in French Indochina. He attended a military academy in the Kanda district of Tokyo, followed by Waseda University, where he learned to speak perfect, accentless Japanese. While in Japan, he supported and became the figurehead for the Phong trào Đông Du ("Journey to the East" movement), led by the revolutionary Phan Bội Châu in support of Indochinese independence from France. The organization was encouraged by the victory of Japan over Russia in the Russo-Japanese War, and received financial support from Sun Yat-sen, Liang Qichao as well as Inukai Tsuyoshi and Kashiwabara Buntaro. Between 1905 and 1910, it sponsored some 200 Vietnamese to study in Japan.

However, after the Franco-Japanese Treaty of 1907, French colonial authorities applied diplomatic pressure against Japan to suppress the organization and many of its members were deported by 1910.

Prince Cường Để made a trip to Siam from November 1908-March 1909, returning to Japan in May 1909. However, his presence in Japan was reported by the French government to the Japanese, who issued a warrant for his arrest. He hid until September, at one point escaping out a hotel window in Kobe as the police came in through the door. However, he was finally deported to Shanghai at the end of October.

== Interwar period ==
Prince Cường Để then went to Beijing, where the Chinese warlord Duan Qirui offered financial support if he would start an uprising against the French in Indochina as leader of the 1911 Vietnam Restoration Organisation (Việt Nam Quang Phục Hội). He traveled to British Hong Kong and then to Bangkok in 1911, but was apprehended by Siamese authorities and deported back to China. He then traveled via Singapore to Europe, visiting Berlin and London. However, in 1913, he was sentenced to death in absentia as the French started to suppress pro-independence agitation more harshly.

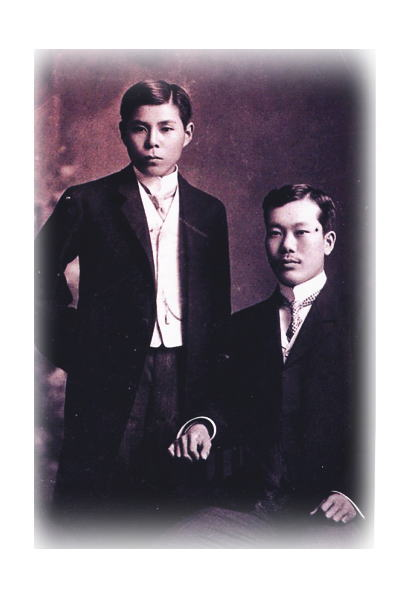
Phan Bội Châu (right) with Cường Để, circa 1907.

Returning to Japan, Prince Cường Để found help from the Pan-Asian movement, including Tōyama Mitsuru and was given a monthly allowance by his old friend Inukai Tsuyoshi. However, he was devastated by the news of the arrest of Phan Bội Châu in Shanghai in 1925, followed by the assassination of Inukai in 1932. Prince Cường founded the Phuc Quoc (Việt Nam Phục quốc Đồng minh Hội, "League for the Restoration of Vietnam") in 1938, which also had an armed wing, as a monarchist alternative to the left-leaning Viet Minh (Việt Nam Độc lập Đồng minh Hội, "League for the Independence of Vietnam") movement created by Ho Chi Minh and led by the Indochinese Communist Party. He approached the Japanese military, hoping to be restored to the throne in Vietnam as Puyi had been restored to the throne in Manchukuo.

== Under Japanese rule ==
Prince Cường Để lived in Taiwan from 1939 to May 1940, where he produced a daily four-hour radio show. Later that year, the Japanese invasion of French Indochina occurred, but left the Vichy French colonial administration intact in order to maintain stable conditions to obtain essential war materials. However, Prince Cường Để remained loyal to the concept of the Greater East Asia Co-Prosperity Sphere and made contact with leaders of the Cao Đài movement who were interested in a monarchy led by Prince Cường Để. Following the collapse of the Vichy government in France and wary of an Allied invasion of French Indochina, the Japanese staged a coup in March 1945, creating the independent Empire of Vietnam. Prince Cường Để brought forth a five-member provisional government, which was sponsored by the IJA 38th Army; however, Tokyo made the unexpected decision to retain Emperor Bảo Đại as nominal head of state, and Prince Cường Để's efforts to return as ruler of Vietnam were frustrated.

== Final years ==
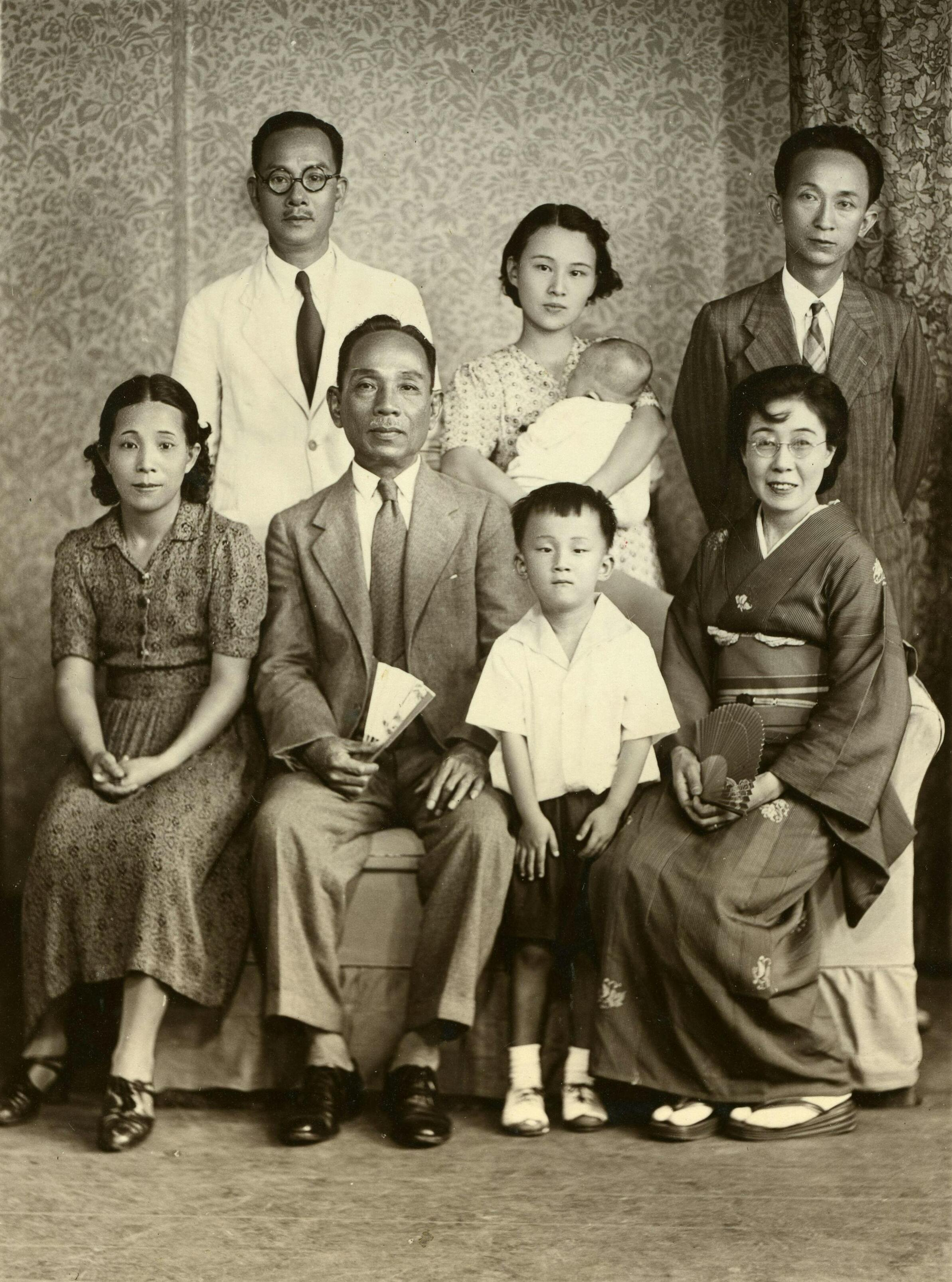
Cường Để and his family in Tokyo, taken in 27/6/1941.

Following the end of World War II, Prince Cường Để became a Japanese citizen, taking the name of Masao Ando. He gave a press conference in August 1949, vowing to return to Vietnam to oppose Bảo Đại, should Bảo Đại sign agreements granting France colonial rights in Vietnam again. However, as a Japanese subject, he was not permitted a Vietnamese passport. His attempts to return to Vietnam via Thailand and via Hong Kong disguised as a Chinese with a fake passport were foiled in 1950. Prince Cường Để died of cancer in 1951 at the Nippon Medical School Hospital in Tokyo.

== Family ==
Cường Để was married to Lê Thị Trân, and they had three children together. He later married Ando Chie in Japan.

His three children before he went to Japan were:

- Tôn Nữ Thị Hảo
- Nguyễn Phúc Tráng Liệt
- Nguyễn Phúc Tráng Cử, aka. Tráng Hy. Among Tráng Cử's children was Nguyễn Phúc Liên Thành, a former South Vietnamese police chief.
