= Duy Tân Hội =

Anti-French and pro-independence society in Vietnam

Duy Tân Hội (chữ Hán: 維新會, Association for Modernization) was an anti-French and pro-independence society in Vietnam founded by Phan Bội Châu and Prince Cường Để in 1904. Its aim was "defeat the French invaders, restore the Vietnam state, establish an independent government".

Gilbert Trần Chánh Chiêu was an agent of the Society. The group in a broader sense was also considered a Modernisation Movement (vi:Phong trào Duy Tân).

In 1912, the remaining members of Duy Tân Hội met in Guangdong, agreed to disband the association and form Việt Nam Quang Phục Hội.
