= Canh Nậu =

Canh Nậu may refer to several places in Vietnam, including:

- Canh Nậu, Hanoi, a rural commune of Thạch Thất District.
- Canh Nậu, Bắc Giang, a rural commune of Yên Thế District.
