= Hoàng Hoa Thám =

Hoàng Hoa Thám (chữ Hán: 黄花探) Đức ông
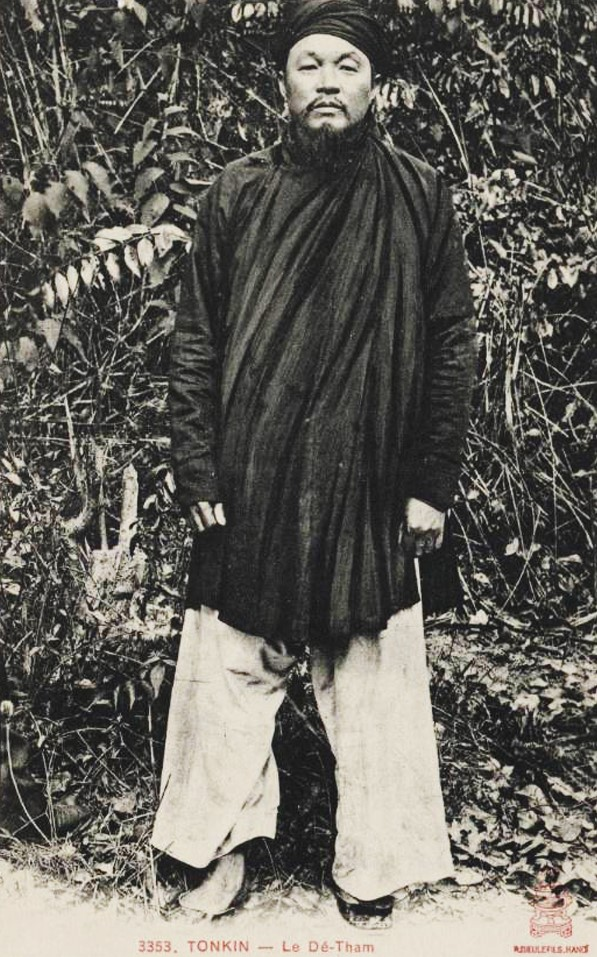
- Portrait of Hoàng Hoa Thám.

Feudal lord of Yên Thế
- In office 1892–1913
- Monarchs: Thành Thái; Duy Tân
- Preceded by: Lương Văn Nắm
- Succeeded by: End

Personal details
- Born: 1858 Tiên Lữ, Hưng Yên, Dai Nam
- Died: 10 February 1913 (aged 54–55) Hố Lẩy, Yên Thế, Bắc Giang, Tonkin
- Spouse(s): Nguyễn Thị Tảo; Nguyễn Thị Quyên; Đặng Thị Nho
- Relations: Đoàn Danh Lại (father); Đoàn Văn Lễ (older brother)
- Children: Hoàng Đức Trọng (Cả Trọng); Hoàng Văn Rinh (Cả Rinh); Hoàng Văn Huỳnh (Cả Huỳnh); Hoàng Thị Thế (Marie Beatrice Destham); Hoàng Văn Vi (Hoàng Bùi Phồn)
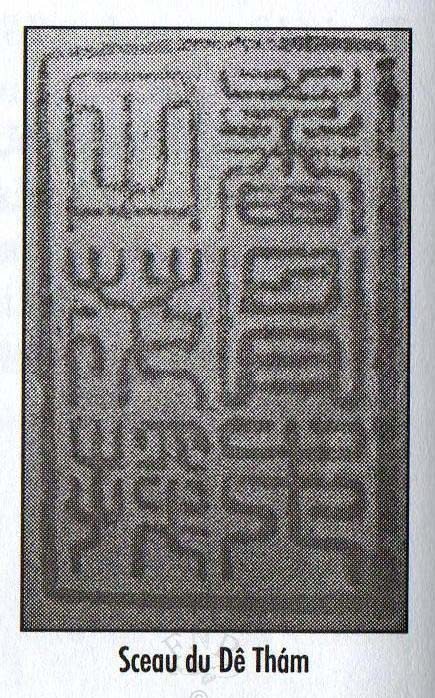
- Signature

Military service
- Allegiance: Quân thứ
- Branch/service: Court army Yenthe Force
- Battles/wars: Hố Chuối; Nhã Nam

Hoàng Hoa Thám (1858 – 1913) also known as Commander Thám (Vietnamese: Ông Đề-Thám), was a Vietnamese feudal lord of Yên Thế, the leader of the Yên Thế Insurrection that held out against French protectorate in Tonkin for 30 years.

== Biography ==
Born Đoàn Văn Nghĩa (段文義）in Tiên Lữ, Hưng Yên, Hoàng Hoa Thám (黃花探) was the better known adopted name whilst his nom-de-guerre was Đề Thám (提探). "Đề" is the shortened form of "Đề đốc" (提督), denoting the rank of a commander, an appellation adopted by Hoàng Hoa Thám as he was never commissioned by the Nguyễn court.

Hoàng Hoa Thám's parents had both died after joining a resistance group in the mountains rallying against the Court of Huế. Seeking anonymity, his paternal uncle fled to the Yên Thế area, changing the family name from Trương to Hoàng.

As the Protectorate consolidated control in Tonkin, French troops under Joseph Gallieni swept thru Yên Thế in 1890-91, routing most of the resistance fighters. Gallieni's campaign however was halted when Đề Thám attacked the railway, seizing trains, supplies and even capturing a local official for ransom. Against Gallieni's wishes, the French authorities agreed to make peace, granting Đề Thám a regional fiefdom. This made him the rallying cry for other anti-French movements. Subsequent military campaigns chipped away at the fiefdom but Đề Thám's exploits and fame proved to be a thorn in the flank of the Protectorate well into the early decades of the 20th century.

== Death ==
Đề Thám's was assassinated in Thái Nguyên by one of his men, Lương Tam Kỳ, on 10 February (or March 18) 1913.

Thám's killer was a former commander in the Black Flag Army who had become an agent for the colonial French in Tonkin.

== Legacy ==
Hoàng Hoa Thám is respected as a national hero in Vietnam. Many buildings and streets are named after him, but also Operation Hoàng Hoa Thám during the Vietnam War.

== Family ==
- 3 spouses:
  - Nguyễn Thị Tảo (The First wife, mother of Cả Trọng)
  - Nguyễn Thị Quyên (The Second wife)
  - Đặng Thị Nho (Mrs Cẩn the Third, Vietnamese: bà Ba Cẩn, mother of Hoàng Thị Thế and Hoàng Văn Vi)
- 4 sons:
  - Hoàng Đức Trọng (Cả Trọng),
  - Hoàng Văn Rinh (Cả Rinh, adopted son)
  - Hoàng Văn Huỳnh (Cả Huỳnh, adopted son)
  - Hoàng Văn Vi (Hoàng Bùi Phồn)
- 1 daughter:
  - Hoàng Thị Thế (Marie Beatrice Destham)
