= Tân Hiệp =

Tân Hiệp may refer to several places in Vietnam, including:

- Tân Hiệp district, a rural district of Kiên Giang province
- Tân Hiệp, Biên Hòa, a ward of Biên Hòa in Đồng Nai province
- Tân Hiệp, Tân Uyên, a ward of Tân Uyên, Bình Dương
- Tân Hiệp, Kiên Giang, a township and capital of Tân Hiệp district
- Tân Hiệp, Tiền Giang, a township and capital of Châu Thành district, Tiền Giang province
- Tân Hiệp, Hóc Môn, a commune of Hóc Môn district in Ho Chi Minh City
- Tân Hiệp, Quảng Nam, a commune of Hội An
- Tân Hiệp, Bắc Giang, a commune of Yên Thế district
- Tân Hiệp, Phú Giáo, a commune of Phú Giáo district in Bình Dương province
- Tân Hiệp, Bình Phước, a commune of Hớn Quản district
- Tân Hiệp, Long Thành, a commune of Long Thành district in Đồng Nai province
- Tân Hiệp, Long An, a commune of Thạnh Hóa district
- Tân Hiệp, Tây Ninh, a commune of Tân Châu district, Tây Ninh
- Tân Hiệp, Trà Vinh, a commune of Trà Cú district

== See also ==
- Ngã Bảy town of Hậu Giang province was named Tân Hiệp from its creation in 2005 to late 2006
- The communes of Tân Hiệp A and Tân Hiệp B in Tân Hiệp district
