= Hồng Kỳ =

Hồng Kỳ may refer to several places in Vietnam, including:

- Hồng Kỳ, Hanoi, a commune of Sóc Sơn District
- Hồng Kỳ, Bắc Giang, a commune of Yên Thế District
