= Tam Tiến (disambiguation) =

Tam Tiến may refer to several places in Vietnam, including:

- Tam Tiến, Bắc Giang, a rural commune of Yên Thế District.
- Tam Tiến, Quảng Nam, a rural commune of Núi Thành District.
