= Yên Thế district =

Coordinates: 21.517°N 106.133°E

Yên Thế district Huyện Yên Thế
- District
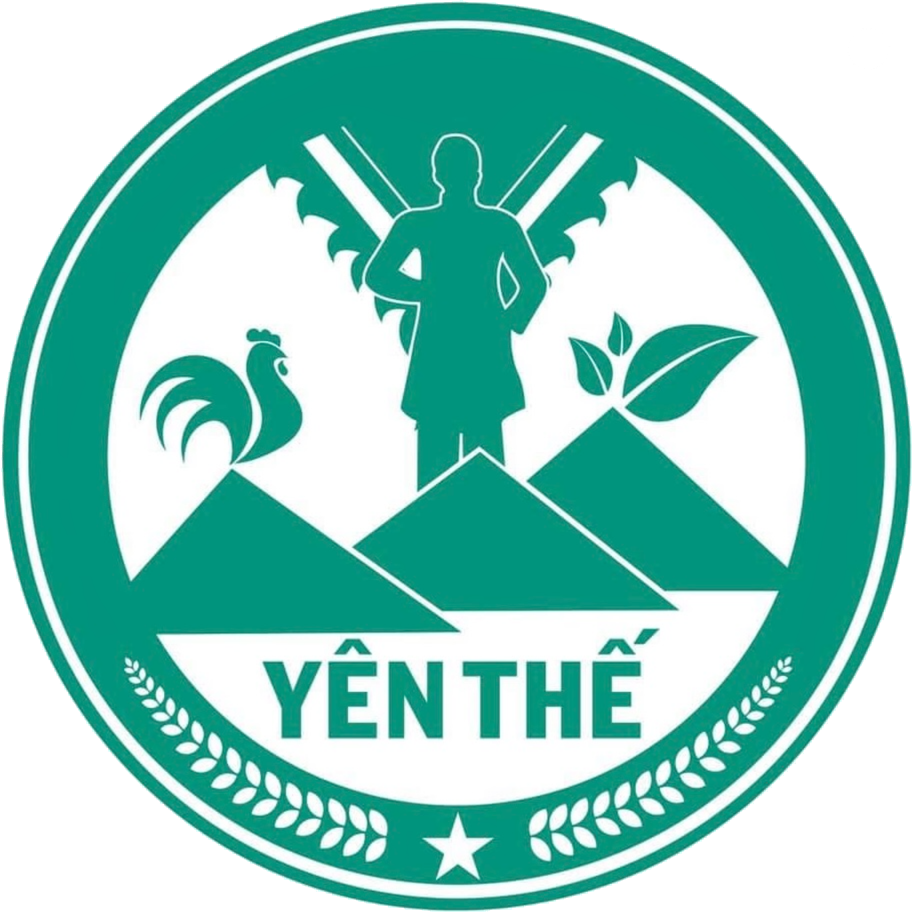
- Seal
- Interactive map of Yên Thế district
- Country: Vietnam
- Province: Bắc Giang
- Capital: Phồn Xương

Government
  - Party Secretary: Vũ Trí Hải
  - People's Council Chairman: Vũ Trí Hải
  - People's Committee Chairman: Nguyễn Văn Thanh

Area
  - Land: 116 sq mi (301 km^{2})

Population (2019)
  - Total: 110,920
- Time zone: UTC+07:00 (Indochina Time)

Yên Thế is a former rural district of Bắc Giang province in the Northeast region of Vietnam. As of 2019 the district had a population of 110,920. The district covers an area of 301 km^{2}. The district capital lies at Phồn Xương. The district is also the site of the Yên Thế Insurrection.

== History ==
The area was the base of the Yên Thế Insurrection which lasted from 1887 to 1913.

== Economy ==
The district's economy mainly focuses around agriculture and industry. The district grows fruit trees and is famous for growing Cam sành. Currently the government is building factories in Bố Hạ, however the area faces pollution problems.

== Administrative divisions ==
The district is divided into two townships, Phồn Xương and Bố Hạ, and communes:

- Đồng Vương
- Canh Nậu
- Đồng Kỳ
- Hương Vĩ
- Đông Sơn
- Xuân Lương
- Tam Tiến
- Tiến Thắng
- Tân Hiệp
- Tam Hiệp
- An Thượng
- Đồng Lạc
- Hồng Kỳ
- Đồng Hưu
- Tân Sỏi
- Đồng Tiến
- Đồng Tâm

== Agriculture ==
The famous product of this district is cam sành - a hardy variety of southern ginseng which grows on the mountain of Chung Sơn in Yên Thế district.
