= Military Medal of Annam =

Military and Native Guard Merit Medal Médaille du Mérite des Militaires et Gardes Civils Indigènes Médaille Militaire du Gouvernement Général
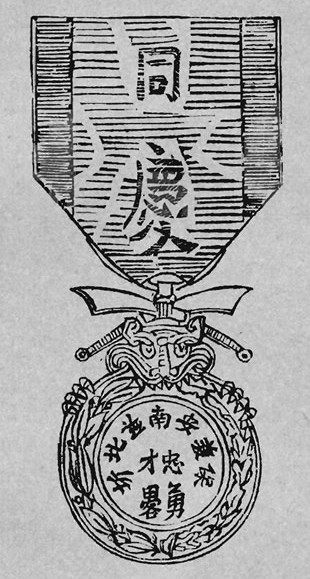
- Type: Order of Merit
- Awarded for: Special case of serious injury or distinguished military services
- Description: See below
- Sponsored by: General Commander in Chief, Resident-Superior of Annam, and the Resident-Superior of Tonkin
- Country: French protectorates of Annam and Tonkin ( (France) French Indochina)
- Presented by: Governor-General of French Indochina
- Eligibility: Annamese and Tonkinese soldiers serving under the French flag.
- Acts: Decree of 12 November 1887 (Metropolitan France); Order of 21 July 1890 (French Indochina)
- Motto: 忠勇 才畧 (Trung dũng Tài lược) – Valeur et discipline
- Reward: 12 piastres a year.
- Status: Obsolete (1 May 1891)
- Established: 21 July 1890
- Related: Cash coin of Honour and the Médaille de la Garde Indigène

The Military Medal of Annam, also known as the Military Medal of Emperor Đồng-Khánh; officially the Military and Native Guard Merit Medal, was a short lived Order of Merit of the French protectorates of Annam and Tonkin within the federation of French Indochina. The Military Medal of Annam was awarded to Annamese and Tonkinese soldiers of the Tirailleurs indochinois, the Garde indigène de l'Annam er du Tonkin, and other Indochinese military forces as well as police officers in the Garde Civil indigène for distinguished action or serious wounds.

Recipients were given an annual reward of 12 piastres from the Government-General.

Despite its name and symbolism, it wasn't actually a medal issued by the Nguyễn dynasty but by the French protectorate governments over its territory, nor was it ever awarded while the Đồng Khánh Emperor was still alive. This was because the Đồng Khánh Emperor died before it was ever manufactured, which was caused because of the long delay between the establishment of the Military Medal of Annam, its manufacture in Paris, France by the company Lasne, and when it was actually brought to French Indochina.

The medal was only used for around a year before the Paris government of Metropolitan France demanded its abolition based on the fact that Nguyễn dynasty warriors and police officers already had sufficient awards and decorations in the form of the Sapèques d'Honneur, a family of presentation coins made in silver and gold. The Military Medal of Annam was officially abolished on 1 May 1891, ending its less than 10-month long existence as an award of French Indochina.

== Names ==
Its official name was the Médaille du Mérite (Medal of Merit).

In French the medal was known under various names, such as the Médaille du Mérite des militaires et Gardes Civils Indigènes de l'Annam, the Médaille du Mérite des militaires et Gardes Civils Indigènes de l'Indochine, the Médaille Militaire de S. M. Đồng-Khánh, and the Médaille de S. M. Đồng-Khánh.

Despite the reference to the Đồng Khánh Emperor in some variations of the name, this is in fact a misnomer as he neither was alive when it was used nor did any Emperor of the Nguyễn dynasty actually award it to their subjects.

== History ==
=== Establishment ===
The Military Medal of Annam was created on the orders of Governor-General of French Indochina Georges Jules Piquet by decree on 21 July 1890. Despite its inscription the Đồng Khánh Emperor likely played no role in its creation as it only appeared 18 after the Emperor's death. P. G. LePage noted in 1944 article Trois Decorations Peu Connues 1882–1890 (Three Little Known Decorations 1882–1890) published in the Bulletin des Amis du Vieux Hué that the Đồng Khánh Emperor might have played (an unlikely) role in its creation and that it simply took a long time to create due to the slowness of its mintage in Paris and delays in delivering it to French Indochina.

LePage noted that the project to create the Military Medal of Annam must have started in Hanoi as the Archives of the Resident-Superior of Annam in Huế do not contain any information about its creation.

In his 1928 book Notes on the decorations and medals of the French colonies and protectorates, American author Harrold Edgar Gillingham notes about the medal that it was created on the initiative of the Kinh lược of Tonkin Nguyễn Hữu Độ in 1886. But LePage noted that Gillingham didn't provide any sources for these claims so he presumed that this account was likely inaccurate, while LePage didn't rule Gillingham's account as impossible, he noted that the 4-year delay from its supposed creation and actual establishment would make his account very unlikely. LePage further noted that the similarities between the Military Medal of Annam and the Metropolitan French Médaille militaire indicates that its creation was likely French in origin and not indigenous.

In the decree of 21 July 1890, the Governor-General of French Indochina Georges Jules Piquet noted his motivation for the establishment of the Medal of Merit. Piquet noted that the awards granted by Metropolitan France to the indigenous soldiers in service of the territories of the Protectorates of Annam and Tonkin are not in sufficient number to reward all devotion. According to Piquet the Ngân Tiền (銀錢, Sapèque d'Argent) and the Kim Tiền (金錢, Sapèque d'Or) were used to reward Indigenous people whether or not they belong to the military or to the Garde Civil, the Governor-General considered it necessary to reserve a special honorary distinction for the Indochinese serving under the French flag in Annam and Tonkin. The Medal of Merit was therefore only a local military medal.

=== Conditions for the award ===
The Medal of Merit was to be issued by the Governor-General of French Indochina on the recommendation of the General-in-chief of Indochina, the Resident-Superior of Annam, or the Resident-Superior of Tonkin.

The Medal of Merit was reserved for two categories of Indochinese serving under the French flag: the military and the civil guards. The second category alone requires some explanation. The Garde civil indigène was created by a decree of the Governor-General dated 19 July 1888, was initially a special corps in Annam. Subsequently, it was also created for the French protectorate of Tonkin. The Garde civil indigène would have multiple names throughout the years, namely the free corps of indigenous partisans, then the corps of auxiliaries, then the army militia, then simply the militia, then the Provincial Civil Guard of the Residents, then the militia or civil guard, Annamite provincial militia, and finally, the Garde civil indigène. This force was the ancestor of the later Indochinese Guard. It was a police force, placed under the direct and exclusive orders of the civil authority, framed by former officers and non-commissioned officers of the army or navy.

The conditions for awarding the Medal of Merit were quite severe: only Indochinese, soldiers or civil guards, who had accomplished a brilliant action or had received serious injuries. There could therefore be no regular promotions.

Piquet also found it important to reserve for indigenous people an honorary distinction entitling them to an endowment. This endowment was 12 piastres a year.

A roll of the decorated indigenous people was to be kept in at Residence of the Resident-Superior of Annam in Huế and the Residence of the Resident-Superior of Tonkin in Hanoi.

The only known recipient of this medal was Nguyen Van Hang of the 1st Tonkinese Rifles Regiment for action against Chinese bandits on 4 July 1890. Nguyen Van Hang proved his bravery by entering first into a Chinese den at Hoang-chi near Tien-son and was recommended by the General Commander in Chief of the troops of Indochina.

It is currently not known how many people were awarded the medal. The numbers held in Huế and Hanoi have not been found and the few medals that appear in the collections of medal collectors probably come from the lots that were sent by the manufacturer to the Residents-Superior in Huế and Hanoi. Author R.D. Stiot speculates that perhaps the remainder of the medals which fell into the hands of collectors came from the Bacqueville house itself (which at the time of manufacture was called Lasne and prior to that the Halley house).

=== Abolition ===
The Medal of Merit for the Native Military and Civil Guards had only an ephemeral existence, since it was created on 21 July 1890, and was abolished on 1 May 1891, less than 10 months later, on instructions from metropolitan France.

It isn't known why exactly it was suppressed on instructions from the government of France. It is certain that the Governors-general of French Indochina did not have authority to create, on his own initiative, a decoration. It is also certain that there were many decorations to reward the Indochinese soldiers and civil guards. Annamese and Tonkinese soldiers and constabulary in service of France were able to receive various French medals such as the Médaille militaire and the Médaille Coloniale, the Military Cross of the Imperial Order of the Dragon of Annam, and the various types of Ngân Tiền and the Kim Tiền. After the abolition of the Military Medal of Annam it was primarily the Ngân Tiền and the Kim Tiền which were awarded to Annamese and Tonkinese soldiers and civil guards for their services.

It wasn't until 15 June 1929, that another medal would be made by the Garde indigène of French Indochina to reward good services.

== Description ==
The Military Medal of Annam was a silver, partially gilded, round breast badge 30 millimeter in diameter with a suspension ribbon. The medal itself is held up by the image of a tiger with its teeth and claws touching the circular design and there being two Vietnamese swords (刀, Đao) above the tiger's head. Both the obverse and the revsrse of the medal feature a wreath of gilt oak leaves on its right right side and laurel leaves on its left.

Its obverse features a disk with the inscriptions "VALEUR ET DISCIPLINE" (Valour and discipline) and around "PROTECTORAT DE L'ANNAM ET DU TONKIN" (Protectorate of Annam and Tonkin). Its reverse side features the same design but with the Traditional Chinese characters "忠勇 才畧" (Trung dũng Tài lược) written top-to-bottom, right-to-left and "保護安南並北圻" (Bảo hộ An Nam tịnh Bắc Kỳ) written counterclockwise (right-to-left).

Its ribbon was usually 37 mm wide (according to James Peterson) or came in the two sizes of 28 mm and 35 mm (according to R.D. Stiot). The colour of the ribbon was watered blue, yellow, watered blue. In the yellow field it features two vertically written black traditional Chinese characters meaning Đồng Khánh (同慶).
