= Đặng Thị Nhu =

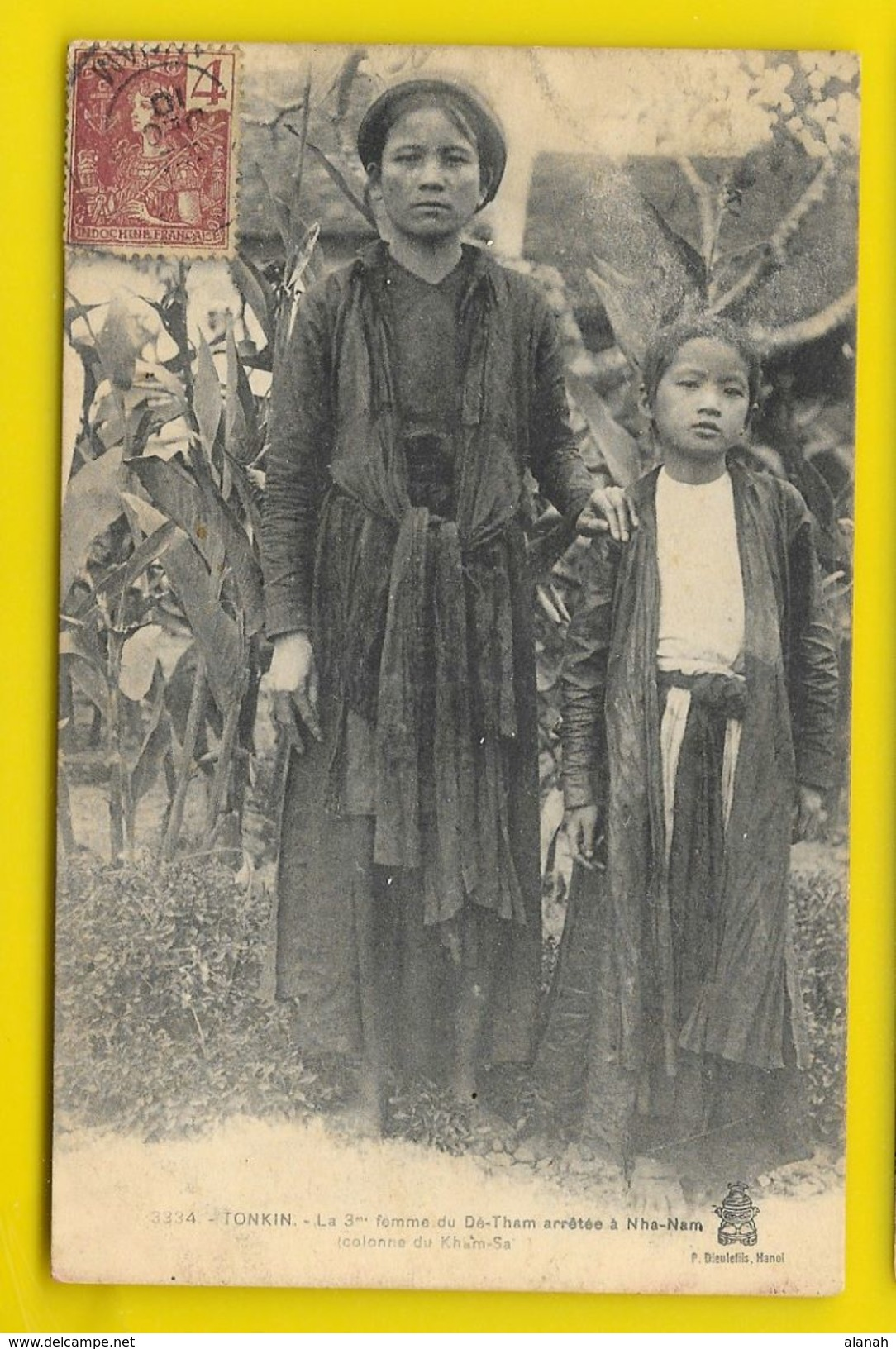
Đặng Thị Nhu and daughter

Đặng Thị Nhu (or Nho; ? – 1910), birth name Ba Cẩn, was the third wife and the partner of Hoàng Hoa Thám, the Vietnamese leader of the Yên Thế Insurrection, holding out against French control in Northern Vietnam for 25 years.

== Biography ==
Đặng Thị Nhu was born in a poor family in Phú Khê, Yên Thế ward. Her mother died when she was young; she lived with her father, who taught her Chữ Nôm.

As a wife and a partner, Đặng Thị Nhu worked closely with her husband to plan for long and difficult resistance. According to Nguyễn Văn Kiệm, she, together with Cả Rinh (hay Dinh, Kinh), Cả Huỳnh and Cả Trọng, formed the general staff, and also good commanders. Apart from those roles, she also handled the logistics, ensuring living life and buying ammunition for the insurgents. When there was a battle, she was on Đề Thám's side.

On the morning of December 1, 1909, Đặng Thị Nhu and her daughter, Hoàng Thị Thế (1903, recorded 1901–1988) were arrested by the enemy. On February 24, 1910, 78 insurgents, including Đặng Thị Nhu, were detained in Hỏa Lò (Hanoi) and sentenced to Guyane (South America). Along the way, she jumped into the sea on December 25, 1910.
