= Bố Hạ =

- Ward
- Location in Vietnam
- Coordinates: 21°26′46″N 106°11′55″E
- Country: Vietnam
- City: Bắc Ninh

Area
  - Total: 0.40 sq mi (1.03 km^{2})

Population (1999)
  - Total: 3,657
- Time zone: UTC+7 (UTC+7)
- Website: boha.bacninh.gov.vn

Bố Hạ is a ward (phường) of Bắc Ninh city, in northeastern Vietnam.
