= Nông Văn Vân's Rebellion =

Date	1833–1835
Location	northern highland of Red River (Cao Bằng, Thái Nguyên, Lạng Sơn Provinces), Dai Nam
Result	Rebellion suppressed

Belligerents
Anti-government ethnic minorities and peasants Chinese miners	Vietnamese court

Commanders and leaders
Nông Văn Vân †; Lê Văn Khoa †; Huang Alian; Zhao Wenzhao; Nong Yagao (POW)	Minh Mạng; Nguyễn Công Trứ

Strength
7,000 rebels 5,000 Han Chinese, Tày and Nùng mine workers	Unknown

Casualties and losses
Unknown	Unknown

The Nông Văn Vân Rebellion was an armed mass-movement of ethnic minorities and immigrant workers in Cao Bằng Province, near the border with China, against the government of Emperor Minh Mạng (r. 1820–1841) of Dai Nam (as Vietnam was known then), from 1833 to 1835.

== Background ==
The tho ty (tusi) system along the Sino-Vietnamese borders had existed since its establishment by king Lê Lợi in 1428, awarded autonomy and honors to ethnic minorities clans that who have long support to the Vietnamese royal family. When Emperor Minh Mạng abolished the tho ty in 1829 during his administrative reforms, along with the assimilation program, these chiefs were worried about being lost their traditional privileges and autonomy.

The Nong family was an influential Tày clan in the Sino-Vietnamese mountains that has origins that can be traced back to the 11th century Nung hero Nung Tri Cao. For a long time, they were allies of the House of Lê, the ruling dynasty of Dai Viet from the 15th to 18th century. As Minh Mạng tightened control over the tribal highland and its private mines, Nông Văn Vân, a Tày chieftain, took strong opposition to the emperor's policy.

== Rebellion ==
In 1833, Nông Văn Vân led the uprising against the royal court. Commanders of local imperial army failed to call other chieftains and militia for help. From Tuyên Quang, 6,000 rebels spread to neighboring mountainous provinces. Nông Văn Sĩ and Nông Văn Nghiệt in Thái Nguyên, Bế Văn Cẩn and Bế Văn Huyền in Cao Bằng, and Nguyễn Khắc Hoà and Nguyễn Khắc Thước in Lạng Sơn, all together revolted against Minh Mạng and joined Nông Văn Vân. Some 2,000 Chinese workers in these provinces, mostly came from Hunan, Liangguang, Tày-Nùng workers under the leadership of Nông Hồng Nhân also revolted and joined the rebellion in August. In addition, 2,000 men from adjoining Zhen'an prefecture in China led by Huang Alian crossing the borders to assist Vân's insurrection.

The rebels initially took Cao Bằng citadel, then besieged Thái Nguyên citadel in early November. At the same time, in Lạng Sơn, Lê Văn Khoa, the younger brother of Lê Văn Khôi, led 3,000 Han-Chinese miners and rampaged the province.

In late 1833, government troops arrived and pushed back the rebels. They launched an offensive on Nông Văn Vân's headquarters in Vân Trung, a small town on the Sino-Vietnamese border. Vân cut his hair in Manchu style and escaped across the border. After that, the insurrection took guerrilla action, frequently harassing and raiding government troops from the Chinese highlands. The Ching court prevented the Vietnamese military from crossing the borders to pursue the rebels. In April 1834, Huiji, the governor of Guangxi, captured a rebel group and one rebel commander, Nguyễn Khắc Thước, and repatriated them to Vietnam.

Nông Văn Vân continued his resistance activities on the Sino-Vietnamese borderland while residing in his second-wife house in Zhen'an prefecture. Nông Văn Vân however was killed by government troops during a casual attack in Ân Quang village, Tuyên Quang during his secret return to Vietnam in March 1835. Minh Mạng shunned the Nong clan and punished other rebel leaders by execution. All mining sites of these provinces were seized and operated by the government.

The family's reputation was restored thirty years later by Minh Mạng's grandson–Emperor Tự Đức (r. 1848–1883), who appointed Nong Hung On as tho ty, and neutralized Minh Mạng's dissolution of the tho ty system.

== Notes ==
Footnote

Citations
