= Yên Thế Insurrection =

Historical popular revolt in Tonkin

Yên Thế Insurrection Khởi nghĩa Yên Thế
- Part of French Indochina
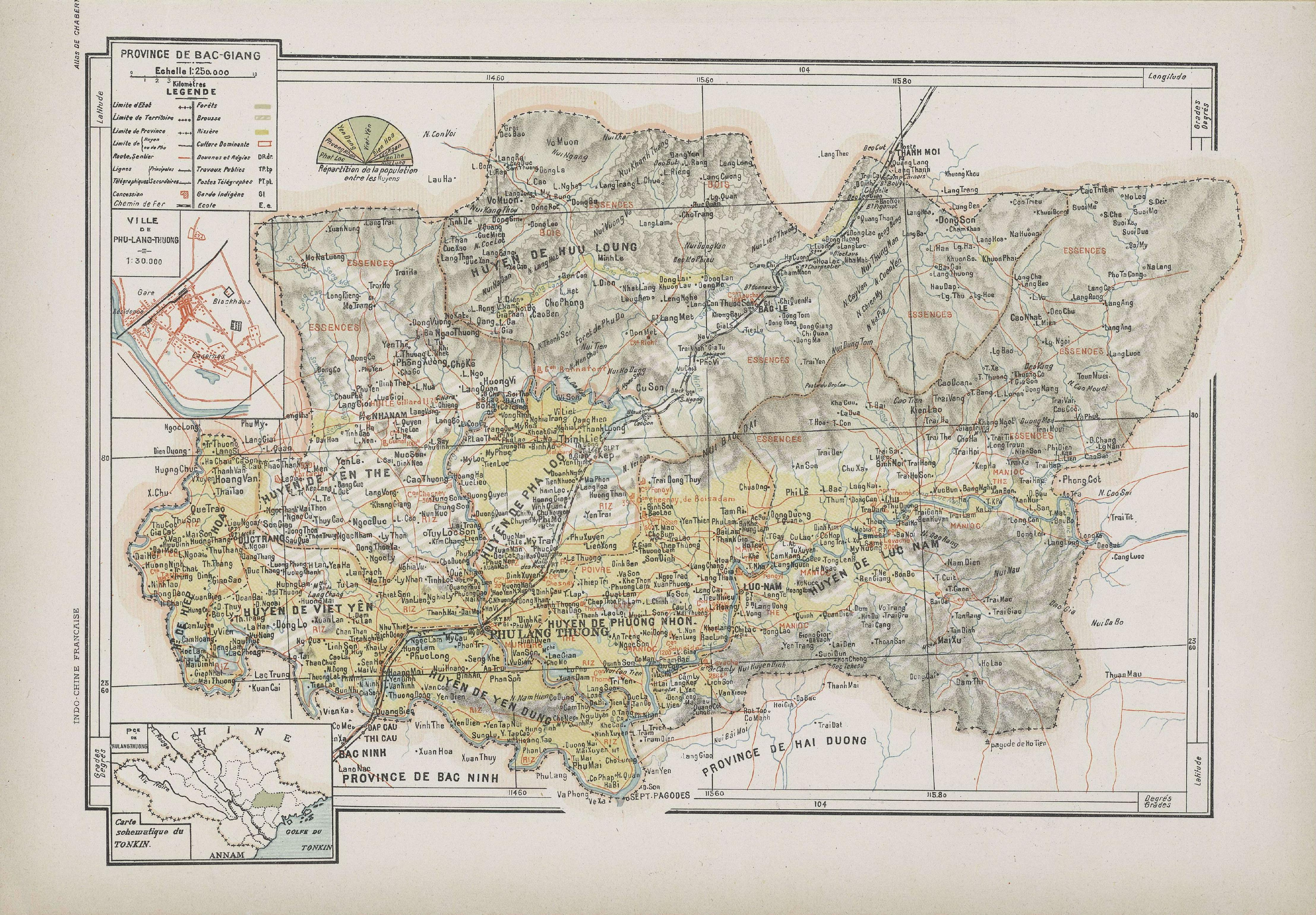
- Map of Bắc Giang Province in 1909.
Date	1884–1913
Location	Bắc Ninh, Thái Nguyên and Red River Delta of French Tonkin
Result	Victory of the French Forces : The uprising suppressed.; Yên Thế Barracks fallen.

Belligerents
French Indochina; Tonkin Infantry Regiment	Yên Thế Barracks; Trung Châu Insurgent Force; Black Flag Army; Tai Canton

Commanders and leaders
Governor-General Paul Doumer; Superior-Resident Louis Jules Morel; General Voiron; Colonel Bataille; Mayor Galliéni; Official Lê Hoan	Lương Văn Nắm; Hoàng Hoa Thám; Thân Bá Phức; Đỗ Văn Hùng; Đặng Thị Nhu; Hoàng Đức Trọng; Nguyễn Thiện Tuyển; Lương Tam Kỳ; Đèo Văn Trị (Note: According to Auguste Pavie, although it has a short time of support, feudal lord Đèo Văn Trị has almost no real contribution to the rebellion.)

Strength
2,700	15,000

Casualties and losses
? (Unknown Killed)	? (Unknown Killed)

The Yên Thế Insurrection or officially Yên Thế Uprising (Vietnamese: Khởi nghĩa Yên Thế) was a 25-year-long popular revolt in Yên Thế Rural District of Tonkin, against the French protectorate and in defiance of the Nguyễn Dynasty's collaborative stance.

== History ==
At the beginning of the 20th century, France had suppressed almost all protest movements. Yên Thế Insurrection led by Hoàng Hoa Thám, at the time, had narrowed the scope of operations and fully suppressed in 1913.

The revolt was led by the "Sacred Panthera of Yên Thế" (Hùm thiêng Yên Thế), (Note: Bội Châu Phan Overturned Chariot : The Autobiography of Phan-Bội-Châu – English translation 1999 – Page 4 "His dogged resistance earned him the nickname of "the Sacred Panthera of Yên-thế.") Đề Thám, lasting some two decades (1887–1913). (Note: J. Wills Burke, Origines : the streets of Vietnam : a historical companion, 2001, p. 53. "Movement, this rebellion was most active in Yên Thế District, Bắc Giang Province. Under Để Thám's leadership, the Yên Thế Insurrection lasted for some 25 years (1887–1913). In an effort to suppress the insurrection, the French established a ...) (Note: Hy V. Luong, Tradition, Revolution, and Market Economy in a North Vietnamese, ISBN 0824833708, 2010, p. 42. "The remaining incidents of resistance involved the Đề Thám movement, which until 1913 militarily harassed the French all the way from the hilly Yên-Thế area to the neighboring provinces of Phúc-Yên and Vĩnh-Yên (later merged with ..."). The rebellion was violent with intervals of truce when the French colonial authorities settled for peace, ceding four cantons to Đề Thám's control.

The policy of appeasement and containment was chosen after several military campaigns sweeping through the mountainous terrain to defeat Đề Thám failed to stomp out the resistance. Đề Thám variously resorted to guerrilla warfare, harassing local patrols, and at other times launching full attacks on French colonial forces.

The insurrection collapsed with the murder of Đề Thám in 1913 by an agent working for the French. The surviving forces were scattered, ending one of the longest chapters of anti-French resistance in pre-modern Vietnam.

=== 1884–1892 ===
In the period from 1865 to 1885, the Northern mountains of the Empire of Annam suffered the raging of armed groups from Guangxi, who were expelled after the Taiping Rebellion collapsed. The local authorities of the Nguyễn Dynasty were unable to remove these forces, so they decided to leave Tonkin. In the end, that political gap arises local forces, who have soon rebelled to rule their area. (Note: Yoshiharu Tsuboï, L'Empire vietnamien face à la Chine et à la France, 1847–1885, L'Harmattan, Paris, 1987.) Among those local leaders, many people have relied on relationships with groups called the external enemies (giặc Khách, "Guest enemy") to manipulate power and even protect their rights.

Until the end of the 19th century, the western mountains of Bắc Giang province have not been exploited. Refugees from the lower lands soon need to unite to defend themselves. However, in the process of expanding the new land, they were close with the forces from Guangxi based on two purposes : Trade and weapons. Their most frequent partner was the Black Flag Army. Lưu Vĩnh Phúc's groups of soldiers often advanced from this mountainous area to ambush the French in the Red River Delta. (Note: Claude Gendre, Le Dê Thám (1846–1913): un résistant vietnamien à la colonisation française, L'Harmattan, Paris, 2001.)

In less than 5 years, small Yên Thế Thượng area (now An Thượng commune) was the beginning of a series of indigenous troops, who were mostly farmers. Each such group usually stands behind a leader, who claimed to be the commander (提督, đề đốc, Provincial Military Commander), or marshal (thống chế), or governor-general (tổng đốc) ... . In fact, the authority of those individuals was very small and not recognized by the Nguyễn Court.

At the beginning all Yên Thế Thượng was under the control of Đề Hả (Lương Văn Nắm) and Đề Sặt (Đỗ Văn Hùng), who had the effort to lead the exploration of the wasteland and then deported the Yellow Flag Army. The Yellow Flag were inherently conflicting with the Black Flag Army, thus both Đề Sặt and Đề Hả decided to support the Black Flag Army.

In March 1892 about 2,200 French soldiers under the command of General Voron opened a fierce attack on the Yên Thế barracks. The Yên Thế force was defeated, causing some leaders to surrender. In April 1892, Đề Hả died. The French documents has reported that he died of dysentery, (Note: Paul Chack, Hoang-Tham Pirate, pg. 29, 1933.) while the revolt groups did not think so. These people doubt that Đề Sặt colluded with the French to assassinate their leader.

=== 1893–1897 ===
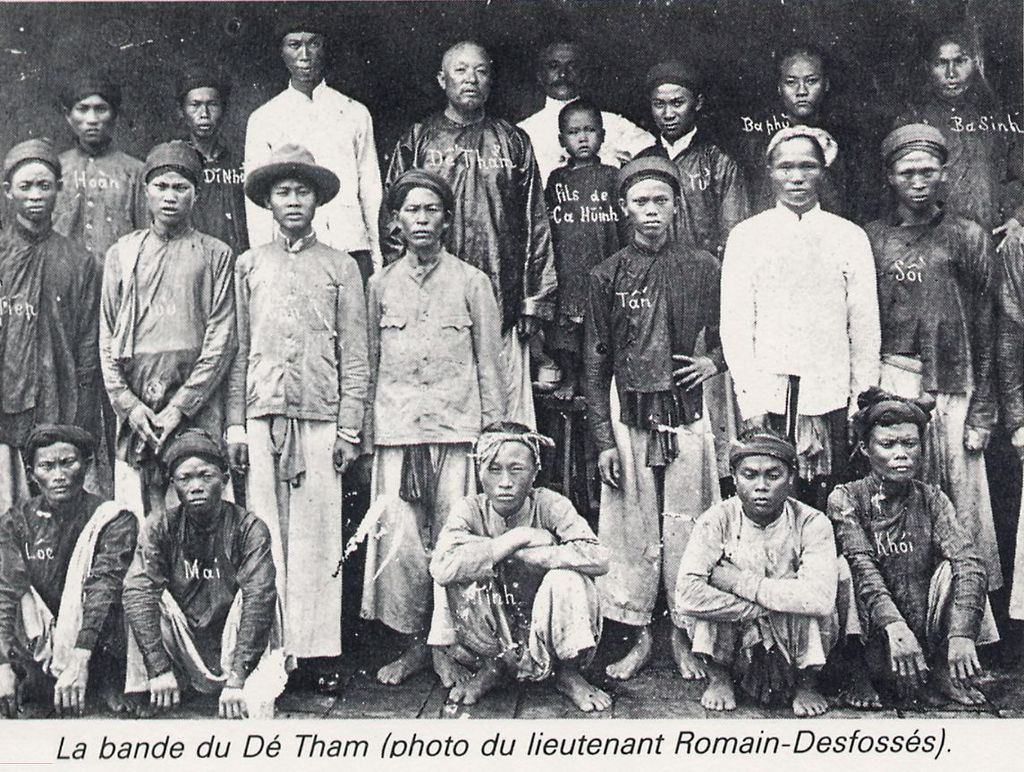
Đề Thám and his assistants. Photo by officer Romain-Desfossés.

In 1893, Đề Hả's adopted son Trương Văn Nghĩa temporarily took power. (Note: Mr. Maliverney, L’homme du jour. Le De Tham, Journal de L'Avenir du Tonkin, Hanoi, 1909.) He soon ordered Đề Truật (Dương Văn Truật) to lead about 12 subordinates to Sặt village (now Cầu Gồ township) to kill Đề Sặt. Đề Sặt's head was displayed in Nhã Nam market for the public to admire. Since that time, Trương has really become the leader of the Yên Thế insurgents with his title Đề Thám.

== Influence ==
=== Legacy ===
Since the late 1980s the entire area of Phồn Xương township (capital of Yên Thế District), where the ruins of Đề Thám barracks, were previously planned to become the Yên Thế Uprising relic area (Khu di tích khởi nghĩa Yên Thế). After the time of COVID-19 pandemic, the Bắc Giang Provincial People's Committee tried to invest to embellish this relic area to become a province-level tourist destination and currently in the review period to become a country-level special monument. (Note: Quyết định số 1537/QĐ-TTg của Thủ tướng Chính phủ Việt Nam Về việc phê duyệt Quy hoạch tổng thể bảo tồn, tôn tạo và phát huy giá trị di tích lịch sử quốc gia đặc biệt Những địa điểm Khởi nghĩa Yên Thế tại tỉnh Bắc Giang thì Khu di tích khởi nghĩa Yên Thế có diện tích nghiên cứu 23.099,7 ha, bao gồm địa bàn 26 xã, thị trấn của 4 huyện : Yên Thế, Tân Yên, Việt Yên, Bắc Giang.)

Currently Yên Thế Festival is the most important cultural and tourism event of Bắc Giang province. It includes many activities to honor the martyrs such as : The flag sacrifices, the vow, the parades, the wrestling, chess battles and especially the folk songs. This event was held on March 16 every year since the 1980s and soon recognized as a national intangible cultural heritage.

=== Arts ===
The image of Đề Thám and Yên Thế insurgents has been solemnly gone into Vietnamese art since the 1920s until now.

In 1987, in the process of making the historical movie Hoàng Hoa Thám, the crew of filmmaker Trần Phương from the Vietnam Feature Film Studio conducted a part of Phồn Xương clay citadel of Yên Thế insurgents, which was based on French documents and especially the memories of Madame Destham. Currently, it continues to be maintained as part of the historic tour in Yên Thế District of Bắc Giang Province.

Literature

- Phồn Xương. 1986 poem by Tố Hữu

Films

- Yên Thế the Return Day (Yên Thế ngày về). 1987 documentary film about Madame Hoàng Thị Thế and her childhood memories
- Hoàng Hoa Thám. 1987-8 feature film, 2 parts
  - The Leader with the Maroon Shirt (Thủ lĩnh áo nâu)
  - The Fire on the Horizon (Lửa cháy đường chân trời)
- Road to Origin : Yên Thế Uprising and Its Historical Relics (Nẻo về nguồn cội : Khởi nghĩa Yên Thế – Những dấu tích lịch sử). 2016 documentary film by the Vietnam Television

== See also ==
- Modernisation Movement
- Journey to the East
- Hương Khê Insurrection
- Thái Nguyên Mutiny
