= Đồng Kỳ =

- Commune and village
- Location in Vietnam
- Coordinates: 21°27′59″N 106°10′45″E
- Country: Vietnam
- City: Bắc Ninh

Area
  - Total: 2.85 sq mi (7.37 km^{2})

Population (1999)
  - Total: 5,250
- Time zone: UTC+7 (UTC+7)

Đồng Kỳ is a commune (xã) and village in Bắc Ninh, in northeastern Vietnam.
