= Xuân Lương =

- Commune and village
- Location in Vietnam
- Coordinates: 21°35′1″N 106°3′58″E
- Country: Vietnam
- City: Bắc Ninh

Area
  - Total: 9.78 sq mi (25.34 km^{2})

Population (1999)
  - Total: 4,944
- Time zone: UTC+7 (UTC+7)

Xuân Lương is a commune (xã) and village in Bắc Ninh, in northeastern Vietnam.
