= Tam Tiến, Bắc Ninh =

Tam Tiến
- Commune and village
- Location in Vietnam
- Coordinates: 21°32′14″N 106°4′50″E
- Country: Vietnam
- City: Bắc Ninh

Area
  - Total: 11.81 sq mi (30.58 km^{2})

Population (1999)
  - Total: 5,163
- Time zone: UTC+7 (UTC+7)

Tam Tiến is a commune (xã) and village in Bắc Ninh, in northeastern Vietnam.
