= Yên Thế, Bắc Ninh =

Yên Thế
- Commune
- Location in Vietnam
- Coordinates: 21°27′26″N 106°7′25″E
- Country: Vietnam
- City: Bắc Ninh

Area
  - Total: 3.30 sq mi (8.55 km^{2})

Population (2019)
  - Total: 8,436
  - Density: 2,560/sq mi (987/km^{2})
- Time zone: UTC+7 (UTC+7)
- Website: yenthe.bacninh.gov.vn

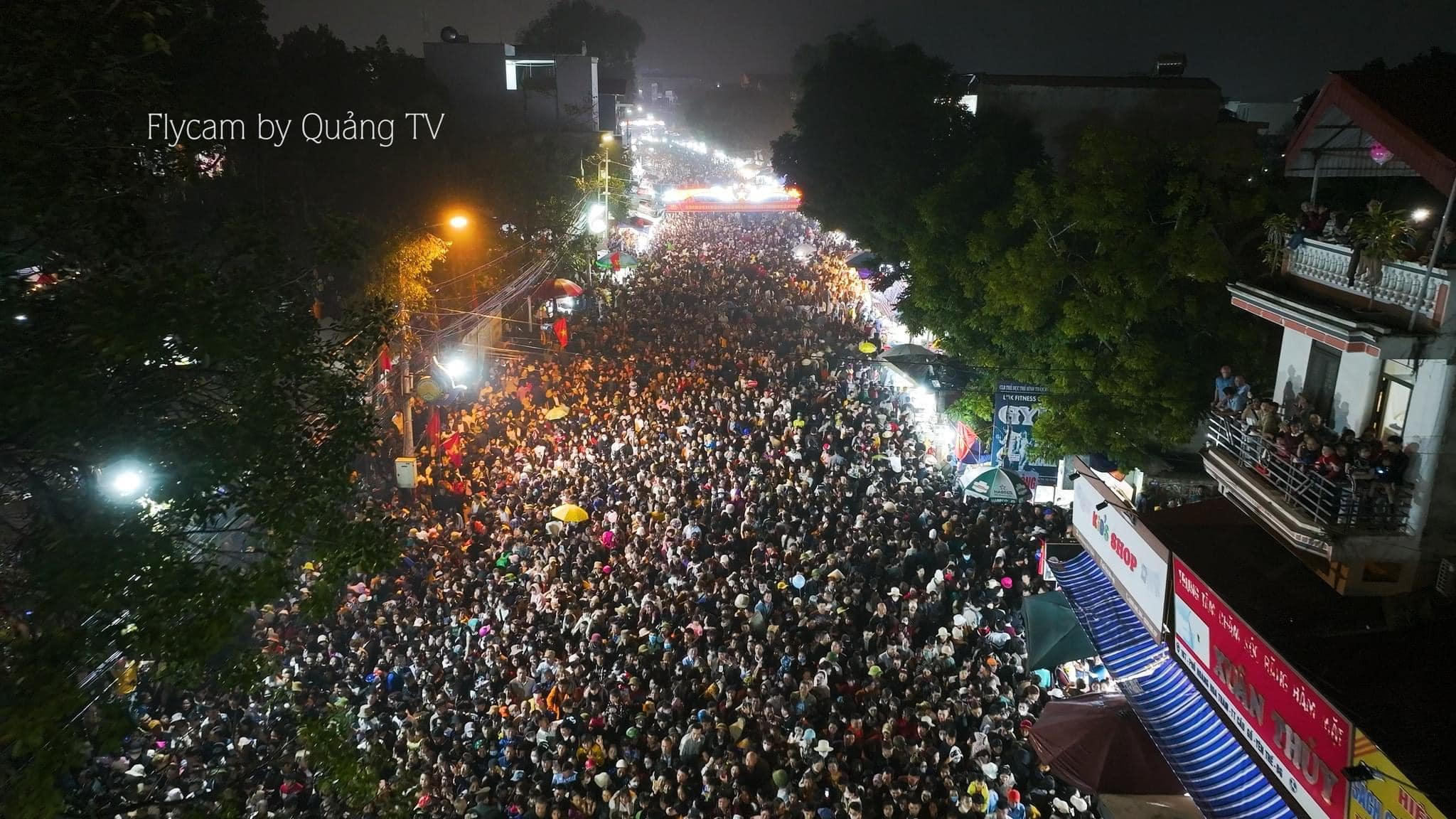
Yen The Festival originates from the season festival in Phon Xuong. Since ancient times, residents of Trung village, Trung hamlet, Co hamlet and Dong Nhan village have often held this festival at Phong temple and temple, in Cau Go town and Phon Xuong commune, Yen The district, Bac Giang province at the end of August and the beginning of September (Lunar calendar). During the Yen The uprising, Hoang Hoa Tham (i.e. De Tham) - the leader of the uprising, changed the schedule of this festival to the middle of January.

Yên Thế is a commune (xã) of Bắc Ninh, in northeastern Vietnam. The commune is known as the place where the Yên Thế Insurrection began.
