= List of Vietnamese provincial and territorial symbols =

Vietnamese provincial and territorial map.

This is a list of the symbols of the provinces and territories of Vietnam. Each province and territory has a unique set of official emblems.

As of the last time this list was revised:

- Provinces that have adopted new emblems after the 2025 provincial-level administrative unit mergers:

1. Dak Lak

2. Ca Mau

- Provinces and cities that will soon have new emblems after the 2025 provincial-level administrative unit mergers but have not yet been announced (in alphabetical order):
1. An Giang province (checked but unfinished)
2. Da Nang (checked but unfinished)
3. Dong Thap province (in progress)
4. Phu Tho province (in progress)
- Provinces that do not yet have official emblems: ( * indicates unofficial emblems )

1. Lam Dong

2. Quang Ninh

The remaining provinces are either still using their old pre-merger logos or have been dissolved.

== Present ==
Since most of the emblem image files are in a non-free format, they will not be displayed directly in this article. To view each logo specifically, click on the word "Emblem" in the same row as the corresponding province/city to be taken directly to that file's page.

=== Administration ===
==== North ====
| Northwest | Emblem | Nickname | Patron | Other symbols | Description |
|---|---|---|---|---|---|
| Lai Châu | Emblem | Vùng đất của những đỉnh núi cao (Land of high mountain peaks) | Lạng-chượng | Hoàng Liên Sơn range, Tác Tình waterfall, Brocade | Province as of 28 June 1909, separated from Son La province. |
| Điện Biên | Emblem | Miền Hoa Ban (Region of Hoa ban) | Hồ Chí Minh | Monument of Dien Bien Phu | Province as of 26 November 2003, separated from Lai Chau province. |
| Lào Cai | Emblem | Vùng đất mờ sương (Land of mist) | Hồ Chí Minh | Fansipan, Red River, Chảy River | Province as of 12 July 1907. Re-established as of 01 October 1991, separated from Hoàng Liên Sơn province . |
| Sơn La | Emblem | Kinh đô hoa vùng Tây Bắc (The flower capital of Northwest) | Tô Hiệu | Sonla dam, Brocade, Flag of Vietnam, wheat | Vạn Bú province from 10 October 1895, then Sơn La province as of 23 August 1904. |

| Northeast | Emblem | Nickname | Patron | Other symbols | Description |
|---|---|---|---|---|---|
| Tuyên Quang | Emblem | Trung tâm chiến khu cách mạng (Revolutionary War Zone Center); Thủ đô kháng chiến (Capital of resistance) | Bầu lords | Tantrao national revolutionary base, Lô River, Flag of Vietnam | Re-established province as of 12 August 1991, separated from Hà Tuyên province. |
| Cao Bằng | Emblem | Miền Non Nước (The Land of Mountains and Rivers) | Hồ Chí Minh | Bangioc Falls, Quyxuan River, Flag of Vietnam | Re-established province as of 29 December 1978, separated from Cao Lạng province |
| Thái Nguyên | Emblem | Xứ Trà (Land of tea) | Đội Cấn | Hill and Tea plant, Steel | Re-established province as of 6 November 1996, separated from Bắc Thái province |
| Lạng Sơn | Emblem | Xứ sở hoa hồi (Land of Anise) | Hoàng Văn Thụ | Mount Mẫu Sơn, Illicium verum, Flag of Vietnam, Lạc Bird | Re-established province as of 29 December 1978, separated from Cao Lạng province. |
| Quảng Ninh | Unofficial emblem | Đất Mỏ (The Miner's Province) | Lê Thánh Tông | Halong Bay | Province as of 30 October 1963. |

| Red River Delta | Emblem | Motto | Patron | Other symbols | Description |
|---|---|---|---|---|---|
| Hà Nội | Emblem | Thành phố rồng bay (City of soaring dragon); Thành phố vì hòa bình (The city for peace) | Lý Thái Tổ | Brilliant Literature Pavilion, Sword Lake, Yellow Dragon, prunus persica, nelumbo nucifera | Capital and municipality according to the SRV Constitution as of 2 July 1976. |
| Phú Thọ | Emblem | Đất Tổ (The Ancestral Land) | Hung king | Hung Temple | Re-established province as of 26 November 1996, separated from Vĩnh Phú province. |
| Bắc Ninh | Emblem | Vùng đất quan họ (The Land of Quan Họ) | Lê Văn Thịnh | Ninhphuc Pagoda | Re-established province as of 6 November 1996, separated from Vĩnh Phú province. |
| Hưng Yên | Emblem | Xứ nhãn lồng (The land of longan) | Chử Đồng Tử – Tiên Dung | Xichdang literary temple | Re-established province as of 6 November 1996, separated from Hải Hưng province. |
| Hải Phòng | Emblem | Thành phố Hoa phượng đỏ (The City of Pheonix Flowers) | Lê Chân | Ship, anchor, laridae, delonix regia | Municipality as of 19 July 1888. |
| Ninh Bình | Emblem | Nơi phát tích 4 triều đại (Đinh, Lê, Lý, Trần) (The cradle of four dynasties (Dinh, Le, Ly, and Tran)); Vùng đất Cố đô Hoa Lư (The land of the ancient capital Hoa Lu) | Đinh Tiên Hoàng | Relic of Hoalu old capital | Re-established province as of 12 August 1996, separated from Hà Nam Ninh province. |

==== Central ====
| North Central Coast | Emblem | Motto | Patron | Other symbols | Description |
|---|---|---|---|---|---|
| Thanh Hóa | Emblem | Labor omnia vicit (Toil conquered the world) | Lê Thái Tổ | Imperial city of West Capital, Quangxuong drum, Lac bird | Province as of 1831. |
| Nghệ An | Emblem | Servientes in gaudium et spes (Serve in joy and hope) | Hồ Chí Minh | Nelumbo nucifera, Vac Village drum, Lam river | Province as of 1469. |
| Hà Tĩnh | Emblem | Veritas et amor (Truth and love) | Nguyễn Du | Nelumbo nucifera, Hong mountain, La river | Re-established province as of 1991. |
| Quảng Trị | Emblem | Nguyện nhà Việt Nam muôn đời thạnh trị (Serenity under reign) | Nguyễn Hữu Bài | Quangtri old citadel, Hienluong Bridge | Re-established province as of 1989. |
| Huế | Emblem | Kinh đô xưa, trải nghiệm mới (Ancient capital, new experiences) | Lord Tiên | Imperial City of Huế, Trường Tiên Bridge | Municipality from January 1, 2025. |

| South Central Coast | Emblem | Motto | Patron | Other symbols | Description |
|---|---|---|---|---|---|
| Đà Nẵng | | Thành phố tuyệt vời (FantastiCity) | Nguyễn Văn Thoại | Darang Bridge, Hàn River, Marble Mountains | Municipality as of the 16th century. |
| Quảng Ngãi | | Audacibus annue coeptis (Look with favor upon a bold beginning) | Trương Định | Fish, garlic | Re-established province as of 30 June 1989. |
| Khánh Hòa | | Chạm đến trái tim (Touch the hearts) | Trần Đường | Smoke Mountain, hirundinidae | Re-established province as of 1 July 1989. |

| Central Highlands | Emblem | Motto | Patron | Other symbols | Description |
|---|---|---|---|---|---|
| Gia Lai | | Trải nghiệm và chia sẻ (Sharing and experience) | Nup | Hdrong mountain, communal house, Bombax ceiba | Province as of 24 May 1932. |
| Đắk Lắk | | In spiritu et veritate / Trong tinh thần và chân lí (In spirit and truth) | Dăm Săn | Long chair, communal house, coffea | Province as of 22 November 1904. |
| Lâm Đồng | | Dat aliis laetitiam aliis temperiem (To give this fellow happiness and another health) | Alexandre Yersin | Lac Parfum Printanier, mimosa, pinaceae | Province as of 6 January 1916. |

==== South ====
| Southeast | Emblem | Motto | Patron | Other symbols | Description |
|---|---|---|---|---|---|
| Hồ Chí Minh | | Historical: Paulatim crescam / 循序而進 (Little by little we grow) | Lê Văn Duyệt | Dragon Wharf, City-bund Market, Ochna integerrima, Nelumbo nucifera, Panthera tigris | Municipality according to the SRV Constitution as of 2 July 1976. |
| Đồng Nai | | | Trịnh Hoài Đức | Electricity, sambar deer | Re-established province as of 12 August 1991. |
| Tây Ninh | | | Huỳnh Công Giản | Hydroelectricity at Dầu Tiếng lake | Province as of 20 December 1899. |

| Ninedragon River Delta | Emblem | Motto | Patron | Other symbols | Description |
|---|---|---|---|---|---|
| Đồng Tháp | | Địa linh nhân kiệt / 地靈人傑 (The glory of a place leads greatness to the people there); Thuần khiết như hồn sen (Being pure like the spirit of the lotus) | Nguyễn Văn Nhơn | Sarus crane, nelumbo nucifera, rice | Province as of February 1976. |
| An Giang | | Hội tụ – Khám phá – Lan tỏa (Convergence – Discovery – Spread) | Tôn Đức Thắng | Temple of President Ton-duc-Thang, rice | Province as of February 1976. |
| Cần Thơ | | Đô thị miền sông nước (The city of riverlands) | Nguyễn Trọng Quyền | Old Market of Cantho, Cantho River | Municipality by Resolution 22/2003/QH11 from 26 November 2003. |
| Vĩnh Long | | Hãy ra khơi mà thả lưới (Put out into deep water and let down the nets for a catch) | Philippe Phan-van-Minh | Temple of Literary Saints, rice | Re-established province as of 26 December 1991. |
| Cà Mau | | Vui mừng trong gian khổ (We rejoice in our sufferings) | Phan Ngọc Hiển | Boat | Province as of 9 March 1956. |

== Historical ==
Flags

I Corps

II Corps

III Corps

IV Corps

Coat of arms

Coat of arms of Saigon 1870–1975

Coat of arms of Hanoi City 1888–1954

Coat of arms of Haiphong City 1888–1954

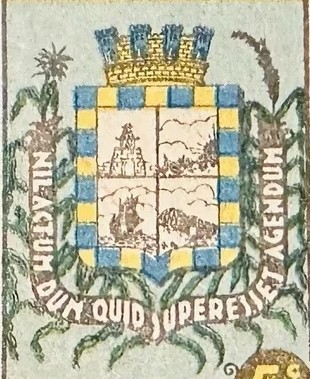
Coat of arms of Hải Dương City

Coat of arms of Nam Định City

Coat of arms of Dalat City (1930–1975) and Tuyên Đức province 1955–1975

Emblems

| Name | Emblem | Nickname | Patron | Other symbols | Description |
|---|---|---|---|---|---|
| Yên Bái | Emblem | Xứ sở ruộng bậc thang (Land of terraced rice fields) | Nguyễn Thái Học | Terraced rice fields, Thác Bà Reservoir, flag of Vietnam, nelumbo nucifera, Lung Lo Pass. | Province as of 12 July 1907. Re-established as of 01 October 1991, separated from Hoàng Liên Sơn province, then merged with Lào Cai province to form the current province of Lào Cai on June 12 2025. |
| Hà Giang | Unofficial emblem | Địa đầu Tổ quốc (The top of the country) | Vaj Tsoov Loom | Lung Cu Flag Tower, flag of Vietnam | Province as of 12 July 1907. Re-established province as of 12 August 1991, separated from Hà Tuyên province, then merged with Tuyên Quang province to form the current province of Tuyên on June 12 2025. |
| Hòa Bình | Emblem | Xứ Mường (Land of Muong) | ? | Sun, Hòa Bình Dam, flag of Vietnam | Re-established province as of 12 August 1991, separated from Hà Sơn Bình province, then merged with Phú Thọ province and Vĩnh Phúc province to form the current province of Phú Thọ on June 12 2025. |
| Bến Tre | | Đồng khởi (All rise) | Nguyễn Thị Định | Monument of New General Uprising, coconut | Province as of 22 December 1899. |
| Kiên Giang | | Chung sức đồng lòng (Let's all work together) | Mạc Kính Cửu | Entrance gate of Rachgia City | Province as of 22 October 1956. |
| Hậu Giang | | Navigare necesse est, vivere non est necesse (To sail is necessary, to live is not necessary) | Trần Công Chánh | Hậu River, economy, rice | Re-established province as of 1 January 2004. |
| Trà Vinh | | Miền đất thuận thiên (The heavenly land) | Sir Bổn | Temple of President Ho-chi-Minh, rice | Re-established province as of 26 December 1991. |
| Sóc Trăng | | | Lương Định Của | Khleang Pagoda, Khmer boat, rice | Re-established province as of 26 December 1991. |
| Bạc Liêu | | Giấc mơ tình yêu (Dream of love) | Cao Văn Lầu | Moon lute, rice | Re-established province as of 6 November 1996. |
| Tiền Giang | | | Dương Ngạn Địch | Tiền River, whale, boat | Province as of 24 February 1976. |
| Long An | | Hãy ra đi, đừng sợ ! (Be strong and courageous; don't be terrified or afraid of them!) | Huỳnh Phú Sổ | Rice | Province as of 22 October 1956. |
| Bà Rịa–Vũng Tàu | | Audentes fortuna iuvat (Fortune favors the bold) | Lady Rịa | Oil field | Province as of 12 August 1991. |
| Bình Thuận | | | Hồ Chí Minh | Usine des Eaux de Phanthiet, Khe Gà sealight | Profecture as of 1697, then province as of 1827. |
| Bình Dương | | Điểm đến cuối tuần (The weekend destination) | Phan Thanh Giản | Tidal wave | Re-established province as of 1 January 1997. |
| Bình Phước | | | Nguyễn Thành | Rubber, pepper | Province as of 1 January 1997. |
| Kon Tum | | Caritas in veritate / Bác ái trong chân lí (Charity in truth) | Dăm Noi | Ngokring mountain, Blah river, communal house, bronze drum | Province as of 9 February 1913. |
| Đắk Nông | | Audacibus annue coeptis (Look with favor upon a bold beginning) | N'trang Lơng | Nelumbo lutea, communal house | Province as of 1 January 2004. |
| Ninh Thuận | | Trải nghiệm thú vị (Interesting experiences) | Po Klaung Yăgrai | Station of Cham Temple, vitaceae, plumeria | Re-established province as of 26 December 1991. |
| Phú Yên | | Hấp dẫn và thân thiện (Attractive and friendly) | Lương Văn Chánh | Mountain of Stone Stele, Hinh River, coconut | Re-established province as of 1 July 1989. |
| Bình Định | | Litus ama (Hug the shore) | Quang Trung | The statue of Emperor Quang Trung in Quynhon City | Re-established province as of 30 June 1989. |
| Quảng Nam | | | Phan Châu Trinh | Laivien Bridge, Thubon River, phoenix | Re-established province as of 1997. |
| Quảng Bình | | Đổi mới, dân chủ, đoàn kết, trách nhiệm (Innovation, democracy, solidarity, responsibility) | Vo Nguyen Giap | Donghoi old citadel, Nhatle River | Re-established province as of 1989. |

== See also ==
- Flags of Vietnam
- Emblems of Vietnam
