= Five-color flag =

Five-color flag or five-colored flag may refer to:

- The Five Races Under One Union flag, the National Flag of the Republic of China between 1912 and 1928
- The Flag of the State of Manchuria, which is based on Five Races Under One Union flag
- Vietnamese five-color flags, various five-colored flag designs traditionally used in traditional and religious contexts in Vietnamese culture
