= List of flags of French Indochina =

A propaganda poster with Indochinese flag and Annamite dynasty's standard in Hanoï 1942.

The following is a list of flags of French Indochina from 18 February 1859 to 9 March 1945.

== Union flags ==
Government

Flag	Date	Use	Description
	17 October 1887 to 9 March 1945	State flag and civil ensign	A tricolour flag featuring three vertical bands coloured blue (hoist side), white, and red (2:3).
	1867 – 9 March 1945	Flag of the governor colony	A vertical tricolour of blue, white, and red on swallow tail blue ensign (1:2). Influences:
	1923–1945	Civil and naval ensign of French Indochina	A vertical tricolour of blue, white and red on swallow tail yellow ensign. (proportions 1:2). Influences:

Military

Flag	Date	Use	Description
	1862 – 9 March 1945	War flag	A vertical tricolour of blue, white, and red (proportions 1:1). Influences:
	1923 – 9 March 1945	Flag of Tirailleurs indochinois	French flag canton on a yellow field (1:1). Influences:
	1867 – 9 March 1945	Flag of Gendarmerie	Influences:

== Subjects ==
Annam and Tonkin

Flag	Date	Use	Description
	1858–1885	Diplomatic flag of Dainamese empire	Yellow field with gold border (2:3).
	1885–1890	Provisional flag of Dainamese empire	National name (大南 Đại Nam) centered on the yellow field (2:3). Influences:
	1923 – 9 March 1945	Protectorate flag of Annam, Tonkin and Kouang-Tchéou-Wan	French flag canton on a yellow field (2:3). Influences:
Imperial standards
Flag	Date	Use	Description
	1885–1890	Nguyễn dynasty by Cảnh Tôn	Standard of Dainamese emperor, beside, used as the [provisional] national flag. Influences:
	1890–1920	Nguyễn dynasty from Thành Thái to Hoằng Tôn	A yellow field with a single red stripe. The flag of dragon and star, originally designed by Emperor Thành Thái. Highly same as the Spanish flag. Influences:
	1920 – 8 May 1945	Nguyễn dynasty from Hoằng Tôn to Bảo Đại	The flag of dragon and star, used as the [official] national flag in 1945. Influences:
Personal standards of emperors
Flag	Date	Use	Description
	1802–1945	[Triangle] Personal standard of emperors of Nguyễn dynasty	The flag of yellow and dragon (黃龍旗 / Hoàng-long kì) or emperor (天子旗 / Thiên-tử kì). Flag ratio is 1:2.
	1922–1945	[Rectangle] Personal standard of emperors of Nguyễn dynasty (Hoằng Tôn and Bảo Đại)	Flag ratio is 2:3. Influences:
	1802–1945	Imperial pennon of Nguyễn dynasty	Flag ratio is 5:3.

Laos

Flag	Date	Use	Description
	1713–1947	National and royal flag of Kingdom of Champasak	
	1707–1893	National and royal flag of Kingdom of Luang Phrabang	
	1887–1945	Protectorate flag of Kingdom of Laos	Influences:
	1887–1975	Royal standard of the Kingdom of Laos	Influences:

Cambodia

Flag	Date	Use	Description
	1863–1948	Protectorate flag from Norodom to Sihanouk	Similar flag to the present flag, but instead of 2 blue bands above and bottom, it was a dark blue banner and a small red banner inside.
	1863–1993	Royal and personal standard of the King	Red flag with a dark blue rectangle inside, with elements from the Royal Arms of Cambodia in gold.

Cochinchina

Flag	Date	Use	Description
	1862–1945	Flag of France.	After becoming autonomous republic in 1946, Cochinchina adopted a yellow flag with three blue strips.

== Organizations ==
- Political organizations
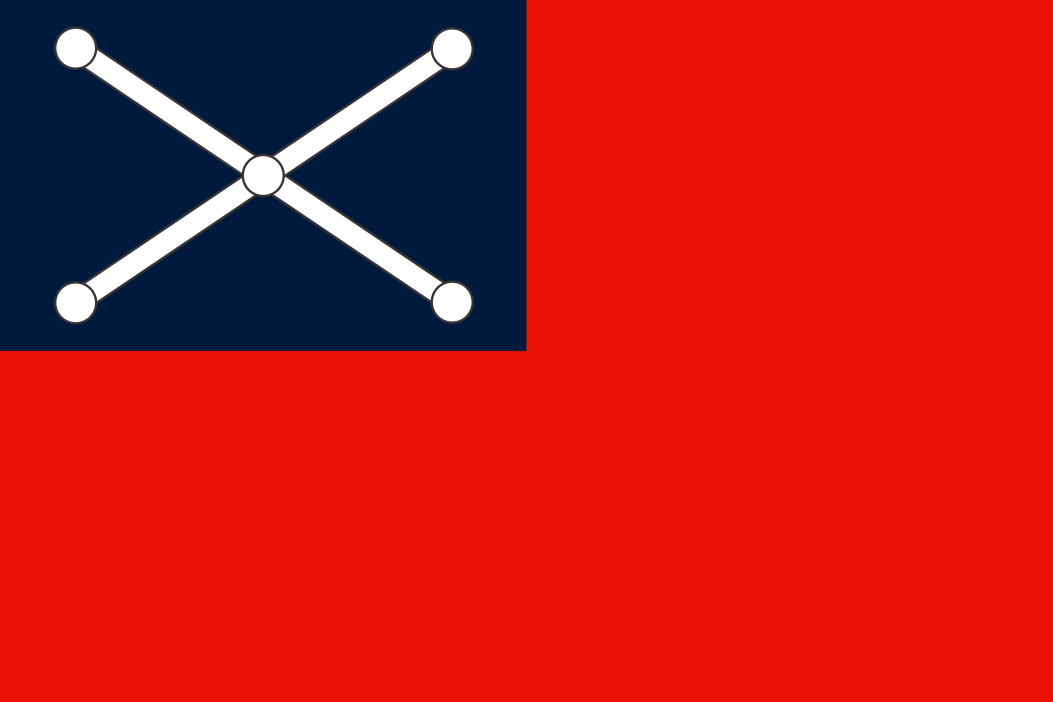
Vietnam Restoration League (1912–1925)

Trotskyist League of Vietnam (1931–1946)

Vietnam National Restoration League (1939–1951)

League for the Independence of Vietnam (1941–1951)

Vietnam Revolutionary League (1942–1946)

Đại Việt Nationalist Alliance (1944 –1945)
- Political parties
Vietnamese Nationalist Party (1929–1945)

Communist Party of Indochina (1930–now)

Nationalist Party of Greater Vietnam (1939–now)
- Religional organizations
Catholic Church in Vietnam (19th century–now)

Evangelical Church of Vietnam (1927–now)

Hòa Hảo (1939–now)

Buddhist Sangha of Vietnam (?–now)
- Social organizations
Vietnamese Scout Association (1930–now)

Enlightenment Association (1939–1940)
- Illegal organizations
Kingdom of Sedang (1888–1889)

Republic of Vietnam (Việt Nam Dân Quốc, 越南民國), designed and used by Yenbay mutiny in 1930

Nghetinh Soviets (1930–1931)

== See also ==
- French colonial flags
- List of flags of Vietnam
- List of flags of Laos
- List of flags of Cambodia
- French possessions and colonies in Southeast Asia
