= Marie-Charles David de Mayréna =

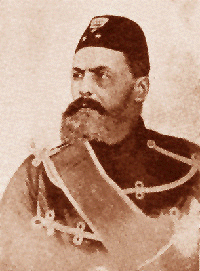

King Marie I of Sedang
- Reign: 3 June 1888 - 11 November 1890
- Predecessor: Office established
- Successor: Office abolished
- Born: 31 January 1842; Toulon, France
- Died: 11 November 1890 (aged 48); Tioman Island, British Malaya

Marie-Charles David de Mayréna (also known as Charles-Marie David de Mayréna and Marie I, King of Sedang; 31 January 1842 – 11 November 1890) was an eccentric French adventurer who became the self-styled king of the Sedang of the northern Central Highlands in what is now southern Vietnam.

== Biography ==
De Mayréna was born in Toulon. He fled Paris for Java in June 1883, fearing prosecution for embezzlement. The next year, he was expelled from the Dutch East Indies. He returned to Paris and organized an arms shipment to Aceh. While returning to the East Indies, he stopped in Vietnam and started a plantation. In 1888, the King of Siam began claiming territory west of French territory. Anxious, the Governor-General of French Indochina agreed to a proposal from Mayréna to lead an expedition into the interior in order to negotiate treaties with the local tribespeople.

Once there, however, he persuaded some tribal chiefs to form a new Kingdom of Sedang with himself as king. Mayréna, his supporters and some tribespeople claimed that the tribes were not vassals of the Annamese (Vietnamese) emperor and therefore could form their own kingdom. The Kingdom of Sedang was founded when Mayréna was elected King by the chiefs of the Bahnar, Rengao and Sedang tribes in the village of Kon Gung on 3 June 1888. He then assumed the style and title Marie the First, King of Sedang.

King Marie declared Catholicism to be the official tribal religion. However he did not try to force the conversion of his subjects, most of whom were Muslims; instead, he announced his own adoption of Islam. He designed a national flag and an honorary insignia—the Order of Marie the First—which he had cast by goldsmiths in Hong Kong.

He also sought to obtain official diplomatic recognition of his kingdom, offered to cede his kingdom to France in exchange for monopoly rights and hinted that the Prussians were interested if the French were not. When the French government became chilly, Mayréna approached the English in Hong Kong in 1889. When he was rebuffed there, Mayréna went to Belgium. In 1889 a Belgian financier named Somsy offered arms and money to Mayréna in exchange for mineral rights. However the French Navy blockaded Vietnamese ports to prevent his return and his arms were seized as contraband at Singapore. Mayréna retired to British Malaya. There, on 11 November 1890, Marie I died under mysterious circumstances (various reports claiming by poisoning, snakebite or as the result of a duel) on Tioman Island.

The Kingdom of the Sedang was subsequently conquered by the French Republic and her protectorate, Annam, without the consent of the government or people of Sedang.

== Legacy ==
French writer and statesman André Malraux wrote an unpublished novel about Mayréna whilst Malraux’s friend and character in La Condition Humaine, Baron de Clappique, wrote a movie script about him.
