= List of flags of Vietnam =

The following is a list of flags of Vietnam.

== National flag ==
=== Current ===
==== Official ====
Flag	Date	Use	Blazon	Description
	July 2, 1976 – present	State flag and civil flag	Gules, a mullet Or.	A large yellow star centered on a red field (2:3). The red background symbolizes revolution and bloodshed. The golden star represents the five main classes in Vietnamese society — intellectuals, farmers, workers, entrepreneurs, soldiers.

==== Diasporic ====
Flag	Date	Use	Blazon	Description
	April 30, 1975 – present	Often seen among the Vietnamese diaspora and within oppositition movements	Or, three bars Gules.	A yellow field and three horizontal red stripes (2:3). The yellow color traditionally represents Vietnam. Three red stripes symbolized the common blood running through northern, central, and southern Vietnam. This flag is prohibited in modern communist Vietnam since it was the national flag of the anti-communist State of Vietnam (established in 1949) and later the Republic of Vietnam (established in 1955). Since 1975, it has been the flag of anti-communist Overseas Vietnamese recognized by many places in North America, Australia, and other liberal democratic countries. It has also been used by some political dissidents in Vietnam.

=== Historical ===
Flag	Date	Use	Blazon	Description
	c. 1858 – 1885	The diplomatic flag of the Empire of Đại Nam.	Or	Yellow field with gold border (2:3).
	c. 1885 – 1890	The banner of Đại Nam.	Or, two Chinese characters 大南 Gules	National name (大南) centered on the yellow field (2:3). Influences:
	1885 – 9 March 1945	The French protectorate flag of Annam and Tonkin.	Or, in the canton side, tierced in pale, Azure, Argent and Gules.	French flag canton on a yellow field (2:3). Used as the government flag. Influences:
	c. 1941 – 12 June 1945	Flag of Đại Nam and the Empire of Vietnam (main article: Long tinh flag).	Or, a fess Gules.	A yellow field with a single large red stripe (2:3). Designed according to the pattern of the medal riband of the Order of the Dragon of Annam. Emerging in the 1920s as a regal flag of the Nguyễn court. In the World War II, adopted as the national flag of Đại Nam, assigned as the civil flag. Other influences:
	until 12 June 1945	An early flag of the Empire of Vietnam. The yellow flag was also used briefly in 1947.	Or	Yellow field with gold border (2:3). Influences:
	12 June – 30 August 1945	Flag of the Empire of Vietnam (main article: Quẻ Ly flag).	Or, the trigram of fire Gules.	A yellow field with four red stripes (2:3). The stripes formed the Quẻ Ly, or Li trigram ☲. Designed by Lê Quý Trinh. Influences:
	2 September 1945 – 30 November 1955	Flag of the Democratic Republic of Vietnam.	Gules, a mullet Or.	A large yellow star centered on the red field (2:3). Influences:
	2 June 1948 – 14 June 1949; 14 June 1949 – 30 April 1975	Flag of the Provisional Central Government of Vietnam, the State of Vietnam, and the Republic of Vietnam (South Vietnam).	Or, three bars Gules.	A yellow field with three red stripes (2:3). Adopted by Bảo Đại and signed into law by Prime Minister Nguyễn Văn Xuân in 1948. The flag was later used by the State of Vietnam and its successor, the Republic of Vietnam. Influences:
	30 November 1955 – 2 July 1976	Flag of North Vietnam.	Gules, a mullet Or.	A large yellow star centered on the red field (2:3). Influences:
	30 April 1975 – 2 July 1976	Flag of the Republic of South Vietnam.	Per fess Gules and Azure, a mullet Or.	A yellow star on the red and blue background. Influences:

== Government flags ==
=== Imperial standards ===
Flag	Duration	Use	Name/Description
	c. 1885–1890	Flag of emperor Đồng Khánh.	Flag with the word Đại Nam (大南, "Great South'", the then official name of Vietnam).
	c. 1890–1920	Flag of emperors Thành Thái, Duy Tân and Khải Định.	A red field with a single yellow stripe.
	c. 1920–1945	Flag of emperors Khải Định and Bảo Đại.	A yellow field with a single red stripe. Referred to as the cờ Long tinh or "Dragon star flag".

=== Personal standards of emperors ===
Flag	Duration	Use	Name/Description
	1922–1945	Personal standard of emperors Khải Định and Bảo Đại.	Flag ratio: 2:3.
	1941?–1945	Royal fanion (Cờ Nhà Vua) of the Nguyễn dynasty.	The "flag of yellow and dragon" (黃龍旗, Hoàng-long kì) or the "Son of Heaven flag" (天子旗, Thiên-tử kì). Flag ratio is 1:2.
	1941?–1945	Imperial standard of the Nguyễn dynasty.	Flag ratio: 1:2.
	1948–1955	Personal standard of State Chief Bảo Đại.	Flag ratio: 2:3. Influences:

=== Presidential standards ===
Flag	Duration	Use	Name/Description
	1955–1963	Presidential Standard of the First Vietnamese Republic.	Yellow field with green bamboo on the top, and the red inscription "Tiết-trực tâm-hư" (節直心虛, "straight-shaped and hollow core") on the bottom.
	1964–1975	Presidential Standard of the Second Vietnamese Republic.	White field with the coat of arms of the Republic of Vietnam on the middle.
	1967–1975	Presidential standard of the Second Vietnamese Republic as Supreme Commander of the Armed Forces.	Standard of the Supreme Commander of the Armed Forces (2:3). Influences:

== Political flags ==
Flag	Duration	Use	Name/Description
	1910–1930	Flag of the Indochinese Constitutionalist Party.	A yellow field with a red saltire in its centre extending to all corners.
	1925–1930	Flag of the Tân Việt Revolutionary Party.	
	c. 1912–1925	Flag of the Việt Nam Quang Phục Hội.	A yellow flag with a canton containing five red round-stars. Influences:
	1929–1930	(Military) flag of the Vietnam Nationalist Party.	A horizontal bicolour of yellow and red.
	1930–	Flag of the Communist Party of Vietnam.	A red field with the emblem of the Communist Party of Vietnam in yellow. Influences:
	1931—1946	Flag of the Trotskyist League of Vietnam.	Nicknamed Cờ sao xẹt (meteor flag). A red field with a white lightning bolt interlacing a hollow circle.
	1939–1951	Flag of the Vietnam National Restoration League.	Influences:
	1941–1951	Flag of the League for the Independence of Vietnam.	A yellow star centered on a red field. Influences:
	1942–1946	Flag of the Vietnam Revolutionary League.	Influences:
	1939–	Flag of the Đại Việt Nationalist Party.	Influences:
	1945–	Flag of the Vietnam Nationalist Party.	Influences:
	1945	Flag of the Vanguard Youth.	A red star centered on a yellow field.
	1945	Flag of the Vietnam National Independence Party.	A tricolour of yellow-blue-yellow.
	1951–	Flag of the Ho Chi Minh Communist Youth Union	Influences:
	1954–1963	Flag of the Personalist Labor Revolutionary Party.	
	1958–1964	Flag of the BAJARAKA.	
	1960–1977	Flag of the National Liberation Front for South Vietnam (Viet Cong).	A horizontal bicolour of red and blue, with a yellow star in the centre. Influences:
	1964–1992	Flag of the FULRO. (Note: The top stripe was blue to symbolise the sea. The central stripe of the flag was the colour red, to symbolise the struggle of three ethnic groups (Montagnards/Degar, Chams and Khmer Krom) which were represented by three white stars. And the bottom stripe was green to symbolise the mountains of inland Vietnam.)	
	1964–1992	Flag of the FULRO, Variant flag. (Note: The blue colour was changed into black in this version to symbolise the minorities' loss of the coastal areas and their restriction to the inland mountains, which were represented by the colour green.)	
		Flag of the New Greater Viet Party.	Influences:
	1964–1985	Flag of the Liberation Front of Kampuchea Krom.	
		Flag of Khmers Kampuchea-Krom Federation (KKF).	A horizontal tricolour of blue-yellow-red.
	1964–	Flag of the Front for the Liberation of Central Highlands.	
	1965–	Flag of the Greater Viet Revolutionary Party.	Influences:
	1965–	Flag of the Caodaist Youth Union.	
	1972–	Flag of the Vietnamese Democratic Socialist Party.	Red tristar and swastika in the white dish, which centered on a yellow field.
	1967—1975	Flag of the National Social Democratic Front.	A red star centered on a yellow field.
	1973	Flag of the Four Power Joint Military Commission. (Note: During the final days of the Vietnam War for the critical transition from a period warfare and conflict to peace, the Accords empowered three different commissions to oversee the implementation phase and resolve any differences between the belligerent powers. The Four-Power Joint Military Commission (JMC) represented each belligerent: on one side the United States and South Vietnam, and on the other side North Vietnam and the Việt Cộng. After the 60-day cease-fire, this newly established commission would, in theory, shed its protective outer garment (United States and North Vietnam) and would then become the Two-Power Joint Military Commission, an insular body representing the interests of both the Republic of Vietnam (South Vietnam) and the Provisional Revolutionary Government of the Republic of South Vietnam (PRG, the Việt Cộng).)	A black Arabic number "4" (four) centered on a square red field.
	1968–1977	Flag of the Alliance of National, Democratic, and Peace Forces.	A horizontal tricolour of red-blue-red, with a yellow star in the centre. Influences:
	1981–	Flag of the Coalition of Vietnam Nationalist Parties.	
	1981–	Flag of the Alliance for Democracy in Vietnam.	A yellow field with three red stripes and five blue stars in the upper canton. Influences:
	1982—	Flag of the Viet Tan.	
	1991—	Flag of the People's Action Party of Vietnam.	Influences:
	1993—	Flag of the Vietnamese Constitutional Monarchist League.	Influences:
	1993—	Flag of the Vietnamese Constitutional Monarchist League, variant flag.	Influences:
	2003–	Flag of the Vietnamese National Party.	Influences:
	2006–	Flag of the Democratic Party of Vietnam.	

== Religious flags ==
Five-color flag

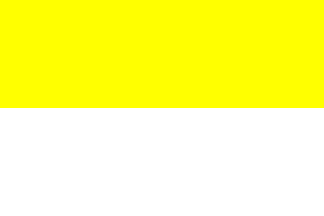
Catholic Church in Vietnam (20th century–present)

Cao Đài (1926–present)

Evangelical Church of Vietnam (1927–present)

Hòa Hảo (1939–present)

Unified Buddhist Sangha of Vietnam (1964–present) and Vietnam Buddhist Sangha (1981–present)

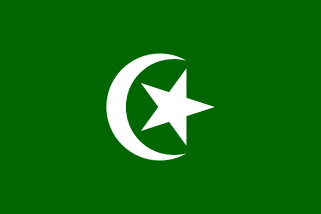
Islam in Vietnam

== Military flags ==
Including unit flags that are derived from the military flag template.

Flag	Date	Use	Description
Current
	1955–present	Flag of People's Army of Vietnam. (War flag of Vietnam)	A yellow star centered on a red field, and yellow inscription "Quyết thắng" (determined to win) in the upper canton (2:3).
	1955–present	Flag of Vietnam People's Navy.	Flag of the People's Army of Vietnam with military branch/unit name "Quân chủng Hải quân" in the bottom.
	1959–present	Flag of Vietnam People's Air Force.	Flag of the People's Army of Vietnam with military branch/unit name "Quân chủng Phòng không – Không quân" in the bottom.
	1958–present	Flag of Vietnam Border Guard.	Flag of the People's Army of Vietnam with military branch/unit name "Biên phòng Việt Nam" in the bottom.
	2008–present	Flag of Vietnam Coast Guard.	Flag of the People's Army of Vietnam with military branch/unit name "Cảnh sát biển Việt Nam" in the bottom.
	1958–present	Flag of Vietnam Information and Communications Force.	Flag of the People's Army of Vietnam with military branch/unit name "Binh chủng Thông tin Liên lạc" in the bottom.
	2022–present	Flag of the Vietnam Militia and Self-Defence Force.	The emblem of the Vietnam Self-Defence Militia centered on a red field (2:3).
	2024–present	Military flag of Viettel.	Flag of the People's Army of Vietnam with military branch/unit name "Tập đoàn Công nghiệp - Viễn thông Quân đội" in the bottom.
Historical
	1953–1954	Challenge flag and Viet Minh battle flag during the final course of the First Indochina War and the Victory Banner of the Battle of Dien Bien Phu.	A yellow star with Vietnamese slogans and inscriptions.
	1961–1976	Flag of the Liberation Army of South Vietnam.	A yellow star centered on a red and blue field, and yellow inscription "Quyết thắng" (determined to win) in the upper canton (2:3). Influences:
	1965–1975	Republic of Vietnam War flag.	Yellow flag with three stripes, and the emblem (gold eagle) in the middle (3:4). Influences:
	1965–1975	Flag of the Republic of Vietnam Military Forces.	Flag ratio: 3:4.
	1955–1965	Flag of the Republic of Vietnam Military Forces.	Flag ratio: 3:4. Influences:
	1955–1965	Reverse side of the flag of the Republic of Vietnam Military Forces.	Flag ratio: 3:4. Influences:
	1965–1975	Flag of the Army of the Republic of Vietnam.	Flag ratio: 3:4.
	1965–1975	Flag of the Republic of Vietnam Navy.	Flag ratio: 3:4.
	1965–1975	Flag of the Republic of Vietnam Air Force.	Flag ratio: 3:4.
	1968–1975	Flag of Republic of Vietnam Marine Division.	Flag ratio: 3:4.
	1949–1955	Flag of Vietnamese National Army.	Yellow flag with three stripes, and the name of State of Vietnam (3:4). Influences:
	1923 – March 9, 1945	Flag of Tirailleurs indochinois.	French tricolor canton on a yellow field (1:1). Influences:
		Flag of the royal cavalry of the Nguyễn dynasty.	Influences:
	1947–1953	Flag of the National Protective Youth Union (the military-wing of the Daiviet Nationalist Party).	The red tristars in the upper corner of the left of a yellow field. Influences:
	1912–1925	Flag of the Việt Nam Quang phục quân (the military-wing of the Việt Nam Quang Phục Hội).	Five white dots connected with saltire on red background. Influences:
		Flag of the Army of the Nguyễn dynasty.	
	1943–1956	Flag of the Cao Dai Army.	

== Police flags ==
Flag	Date	Use	Description
Current
	1955–present	Flag of the Vietnam People's Public Security	A yellow star centered on a red field, and yellow inscription "Bảo vệ an ninh tổ quốc" (Protecting the Fatherland's Security) in the upper canton (2:3).
Historical
	1955–1975	Flag of Republic of Vietnam National Police	A green flag with the motto "Tổ quốc, Công minh – Liêm chính" (Fatherland, Justice – Integrity) in the top, the police badge in the middle, and the name "Cảnh sát Quốc gia" (National Police) in the bottom (2:3).
	1955–1975	Other variant flag of the Republic of Vietnam National Police	RVN police symbol on the South Vietnam’s flag with green background.

== Ensigns ==
Flag	Date	Use	Description
Historical
	1923–1945; 1945–1949	Civil and Naval Ensign of French Indochina.	A yellow ensign with the French tricolor in the canton and swallow tail. (proportions 1:2). Influences:
	1952–1975	Naval ensign of State of Vietnam and Republic of Vietnam.	Yellow field with three red stripes and an anchor in the middle (2:3). Influences:
Current
	1998–present	Ensign of Vietnam Coast Guard.	A dark blue pennant with the Vietnamese national emblem (sometimes simplified) in the middle and a yellow/golden arrow pointing toward the pole (2:3).
	2014–present	Naval ensign of Vietnam People's Navy.	A white flag with an emblem representing the Vietnam People's Navy on the top and a blue strip below (2:3). Influences:
	2014–present	Jack of the Vietnam Fisheries Surveillance.	A light blue pennant with the agency's emblem in the middle (2:3).
	Before 2023–present	Ensign of Vietnam Border Guard.	A green triangular flag with the Vietnamese national emblem and "Border Patrol" inscription in two languages (2:3).
	2022–present	Flag and ensign of the maritime militia.	The force's emblem centered on a red field (2:3).
	2021–present	Alternative ensign of the maritime militia.	A red pennant with the force's emblem in the middle (2:3).

== Flags of Vietnamese subjects ==
=== Provinces of the Nguyễn dynasty ===
Thừa Thiên

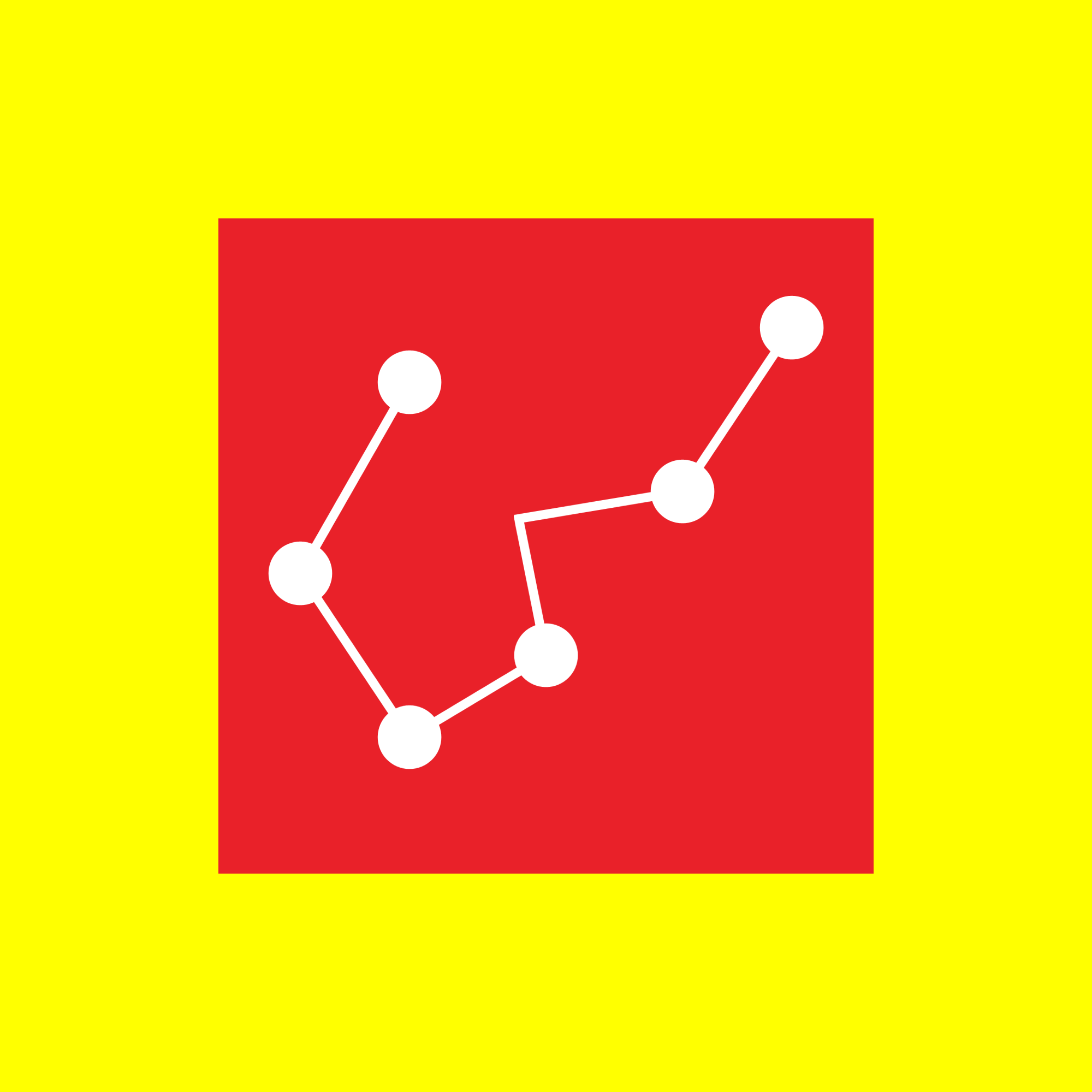
Quảng Trị

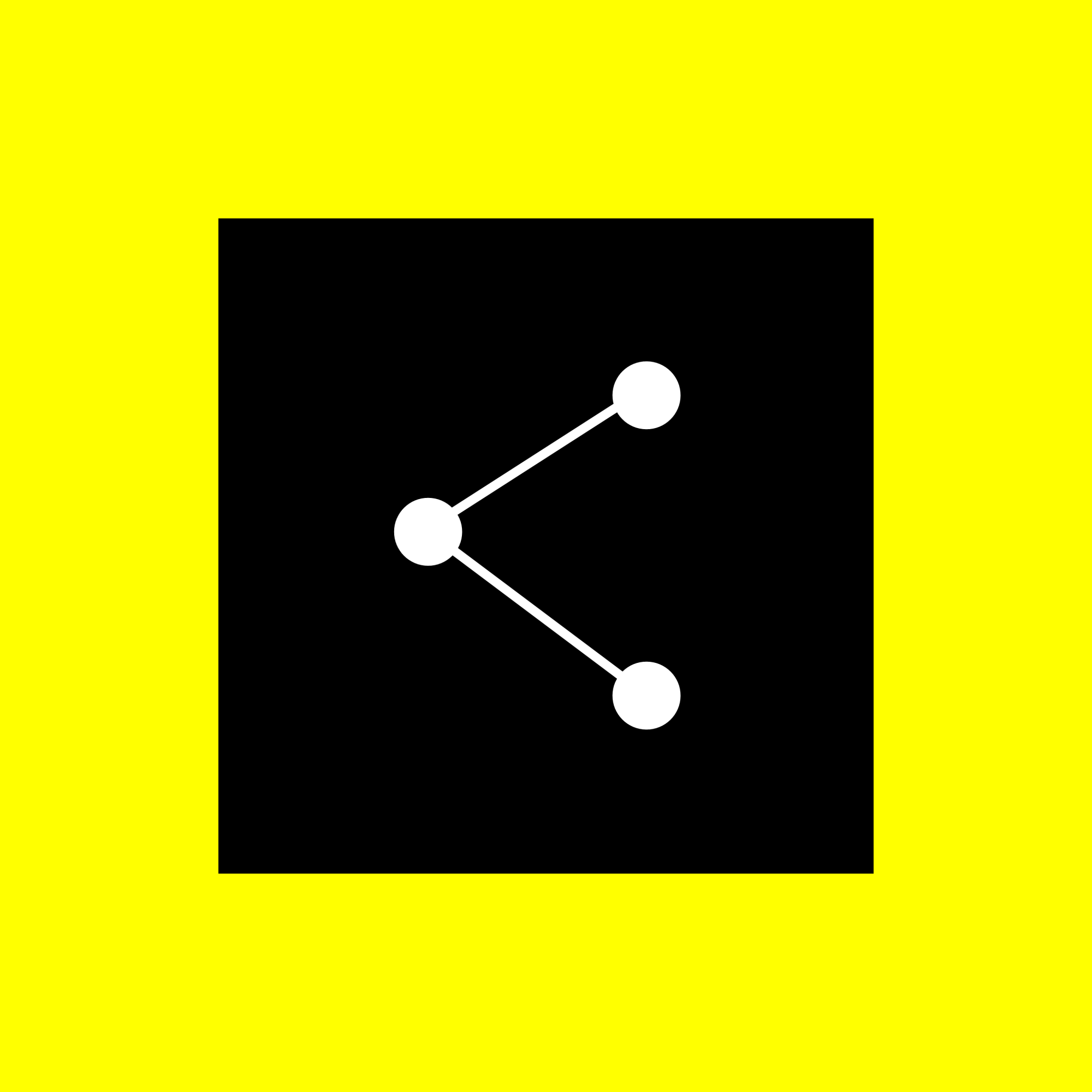
Quảng Nam

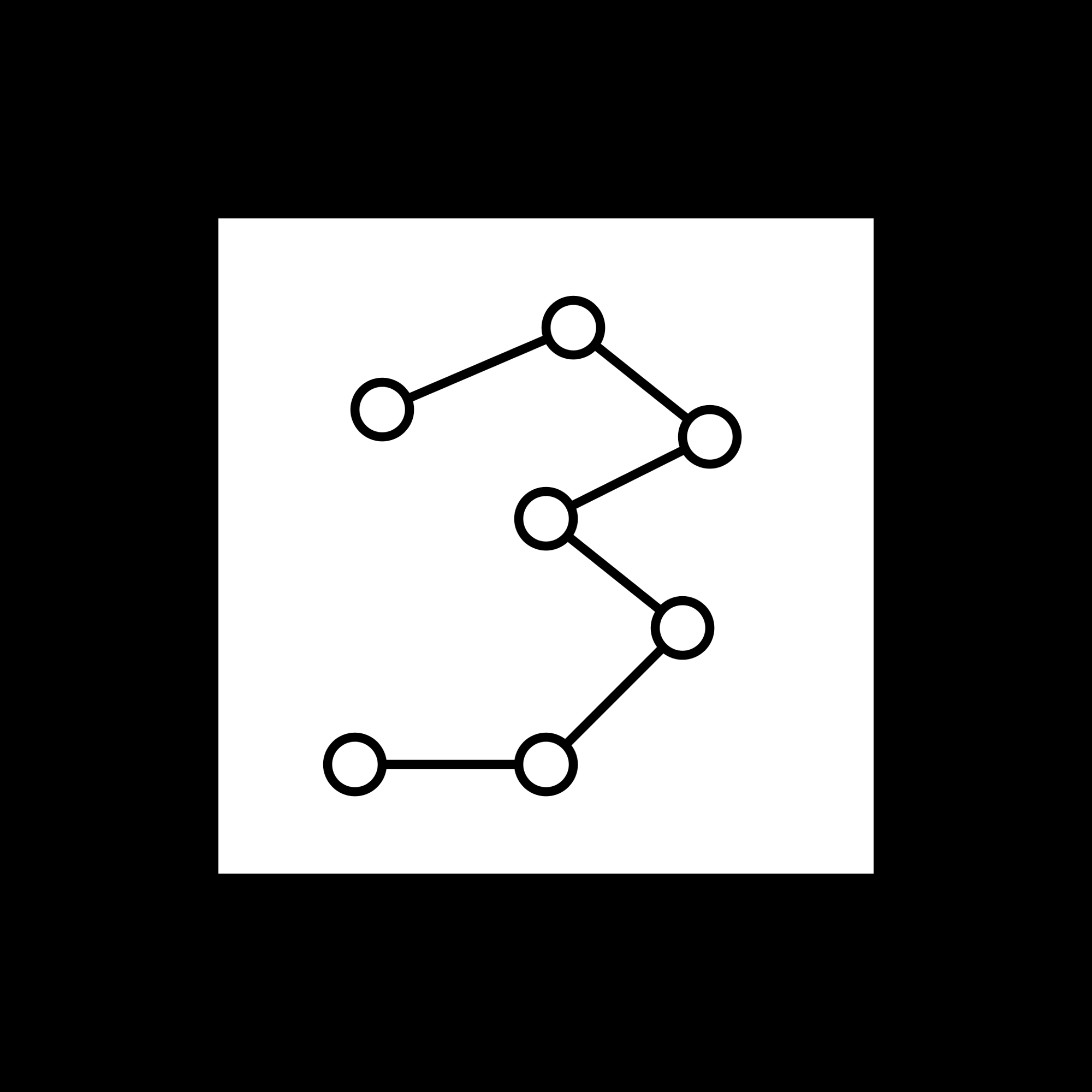
Hanoi

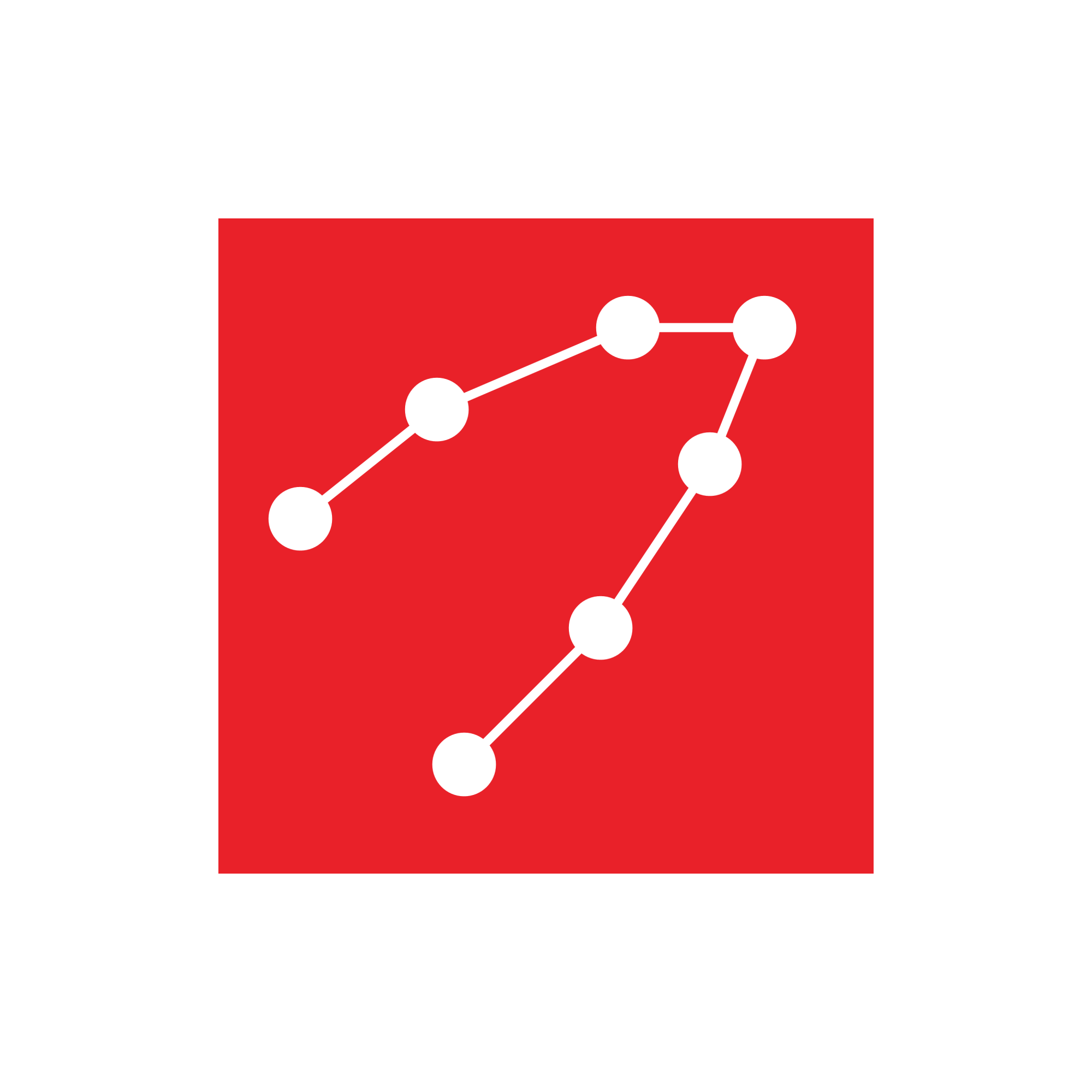
Thanh Hóa

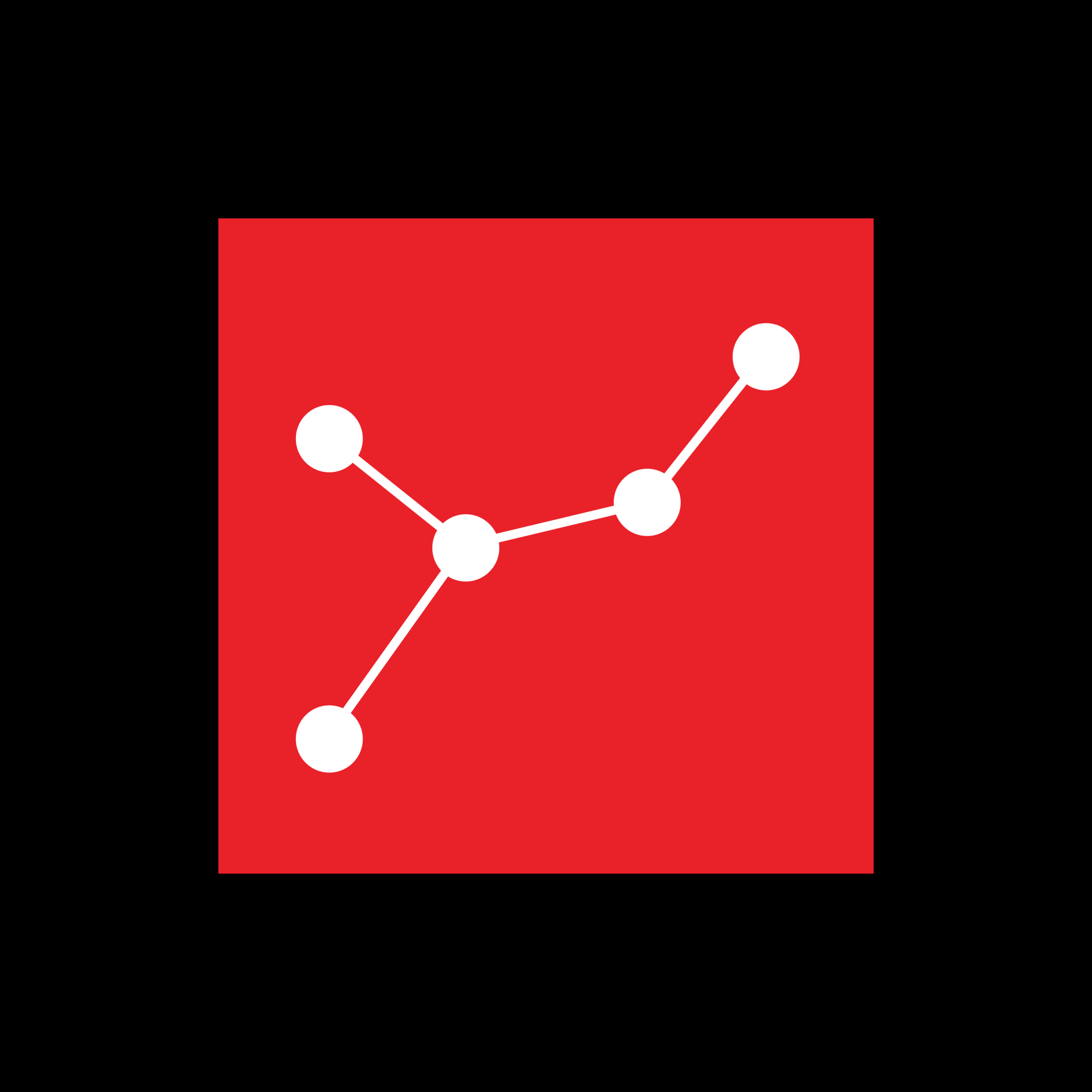
Bình Định

=== Areas with special status and ethnic minorities ===
Flag	Duration	Use	Name/Description
	16th century–	Flag of the Kingdom of Champa	The flag used by the Kingdom of Champa after converting to Islam around the 16th century.
	1946	Flag of the Autonomous Republic of Cochinchina	A yellow field crossed by three thin blue stripes, which possibly represent the Đồng Nai River, Bassac River and the Mekong. Possibly the inspiration for the yellow flag with three blue stripes featured on the cover of the first issue of the Cahiers franco-vietnamiens (1948).
	1946–1948	Flag of the Autonomous Republic of Cochinchina	A yellow field with two white strips and three blue strips. Influences:
	1888–1889	Flag of the Kingdom of Sedang	A white maltese cross centered on a blue field.
	1888–1889	Flag of the Kingdom of Sedang (1927 Bulletin des Amis du Vieux-Huế variant)	Light blue in colour with a red cross of Malta and in its centre a white star, alternatively it could have been red in colour with a blue cross of Malta and a white star. (Note: The original photograph was black and white.)
	1888–1889	Flag of the Kingdom of Sedang (K. Fachinger variant)	Blue with a white St. George's cross and a red star.
	1888–1889	Flag of the Kingdom of Sedang (Vexilla Belgica variant)	A light blue flag with a white cross of Malta. (Note: As reported by the fathers involved who joined the Charles-Marie (David) de Mayréna mission into the jungles.)
	1889–1897	Flag of the Confederation of Sedang	Influences:
	1944–1953	Flag of the Tai Dón people	A large red square centered on a yellow field (2:3).
	1946–1950	Flag of the Montagnard country of South Indochina	Influences:
	1946–1950	Flag of Tai Autonomous Territory	Influences:
	1950–1955	Flag of Sip Song Chau Tai	A vertical tricolour of blue, white, and red: One white stripe is between two blue stripes, a red star with 16 rays is in white field. Influences:
	1947–1954	Flag of the Nùng Autonomous Territory	Influences:
	1947–1954	Flag of the Thổ Autonomous Territory (Tay people)	Flag ratio: 2:3.
	1947–1954	Flag of the Mường Autonomous Territory (Mường people).	A large white pentagram centered on a green field (2:3). Influences:
	?–1975	Flag of Khmer Mountain Tribes	A green field with a white star what has 16 rays charged in the left.
	?	Flag of the Front de Lutte du Kampuchea Krom (FLKK)	Influences:
	1964–1965	Flag of Republic of Central Highlands and Champa	Influences:
	1962–1964	Flag of Front for the Liberation of Champa	Flag ratio: 2:3.
	March 1964–?	Flag of the Front de Liberation des Hauts Plateaux (FLHP)	Influences:
	?	Flag of Lahu	Flag ratio: 3:5. Influences:
	1993—	Flag of the Hmong people	
	1969–1976	Flag of the Provisional Revolutionary Government of the Republic of South Vietnam	A yellow star on a red and blue background. Influences:
	1969–?	Flag of the Movement for Unity of the Southern Highland Ethnic Minorities (MUSHEN) (Note: Also known by the name of the Movement for the Unity of Ethnic Groups of South Viet-Nam.)	Three equal stripes of green (top), yellow, and red. These colours stood respectively for the mountains and jungles of the Highlands, the (South) Vietnamese national color, and the spirit of common struggle on behalf of the fatherland.
	1985–?	Flag of Khmer Krom	Rectangular tricolour with three equal-size horizontal bands: the upper one is blue, the middle yellow, and the lower red (3:5). Influences:
	1986–	Flag of the Save The Montagnard People (Note: Save The Montagnard People, Inc. is a United States-based organisation with addresses all over the Eastern U.S. and run also by the former Green Berets.)	The 1986 flag of Save the Montagnard People organisation in Greensboro, North Carolina which is supposed to be the flag of all Montagnard / Dega people, was modeled after the earlier flag used by the Movement for Unity of the Southern Highland Ethnic Minorities (MUSHEN) in the Republic of Vietnam during the Vietnam War. The significant difference might be the removal of the yellow colour because it's associated with the Vietnamese. The golden band represents a montagnard bracelet. (Note: Montagnard bracelets are often referred to as "kong" or "kong te". The symbols in general are supposed to represent the following: – Green – mountains and forest; – White – peace and honesty; – Red – blood and struggle; – Elephant – gentle and powerful.) Influences:
	1987–	Flag of the Montagnard Degar Association (MDA)	Based on the above flag but the bracelet is a full ring. Influences:
	1990–	Flag or the Degar Foundation	
	2000–	Flag of the International Office of Champa for the Cham people	
	2000–2010	Flag of the United Montagnard People (UMP)	
		Flag of the Council for the Socio-Cultural Development of Champa	A vertical tricolour with the colours blue, green, and red and a photograph of a yellowish-white flower (Plumeria alba) in the middle (green) field. (Note: Note that the official flag uses an actual photograph of the flower and not a mere illustration representing a flower and that the flag is described by the organisation as "the flag of the Cham people" or sometimes "the flag of the Cham diaspora".) Ratio 3:5.
	2000s–	Flag of the United Montagnard Republic (claimed exiled southern Montagnard government)	Seven horizontal stripes, the inner four stripes are white, the outer two are green, while the two stripes in its centre are coloured red (that is: Green-white-red-white-red-white-green). On its upper left area is a squarish canton which takes up five stripes, the canton is blue in colour with a thin yellow Latin cross, representing Protestant Christianity, connected to a laying double concave lens shape that extends to all the sides of the canton. (Note: The addition of Protestant Christian imagery is likely due to the mass conversion of Southern Montagnard people to Protestantism following them reconnecting with their family members that make up the Montagnard diaspora in the United States of America, a majority Protestant nation.)
	?	Flag of the Chinese Nùng people	A vertical tricolour with the colours green-red-green and the coat of arms of the Nùng Autonomous Territory in its centre. Influences:

=== Municipalities ===
Flag	Duration	Use	Name/Description
	2010?–	Decorative flag for Hanoi	Emblem of Hanoi in gold on a red field, similar to the national flag of Vietnam.
	2016?–	Unofficial flag of Haiphong (used by the city's people during sport events)	Seal of Haiphong (the royal poinciana flower) on a white field with 2 red stripes at the top and the bottom (the width of the stripes varies).

== Social flags ==
=== Commercial flags ===
Though not standardized and rarely seen, state-owned corporations in Vietnam sometimes have their own flags.

Flag	Duration	Use	Name/Description
	1994–present	Flag of the Vietnam Electricity (EVN)	Blue field with the logo of the EVN
	1988–present	Flag of the Vietnam Bank for Agriculture and Rural Development (Agribank)	Red field with the logo of Agribank, on is the text "Ngân hàng Nông nghiệp và Phát triển Nông thôn Việt Nam" (Vietnam Bank for Agriculture and Rural Development)
	1975–present	Flag of Vietnam Sea Transport & Chartering Co.	Horizontal bicolor of red over blue with a yellow "V" in the middle. Influences:
	1995–2007	Flag of Falcon Shipping Company	Green field with a white letter "F"
	2007–present	Flag of Vietnam Oil and Gas Transportation Joint Stock Company (previously Falcon Shipping Company)	Green field with a red six-pointed star and the white letter "F" in the middle
	2006–present	Flag of Vinaship Joint Stock Co.	Sky blue flag with a "V" formed by a white bird
	2021–present	Flag of Viettel Group	Red flag with white Viettel typeface logo and its Vietnamese slogan.
	20??–present	Flag of Vinfast	Navy blue flag with the Vinfast logo centered

=== Organization flags ===
Flag	Duration	Use	Name/Description
	2007–present	Flag of the Big Dipper Union	An azure blue field with the logo of the organization
	1946–present	Flag of Vietnam Red Cross	White field with the logo of the Vietnam Red Cross Association. Influences:
	1946–present	The flag of Vietnam Red Cross	The Red Cross flag with the text "Vietnam Red Cross Association" in Vietnamese. Influences:
	1990s–present	Official flag of the Vovinam Association	Yellow field with the symbol of Vovinam in the middle, the text "Vovinam" in red at the top of the hoist side and "Việt Võ Đạo" in blue at the bottom of the fly side
	1930–present	Flag of the Vietnamese Scout Association	A red field with the lily flower symbol and the scout knot in red. Influences:
	1973-present	Flag of Vietnam Forest Rangers	A dark green field with the Forest Ranger emblem in the center, and yellow inscription "Rừng là vàng, nếu mình biết bảo vệ, xây dựng thì rừng rất quý" (Forests are gold, if we know how to protect and develop them, they are very precious) in the upper canton.

=== Historical flags ===
Flag	Duration	Use	Name/Description
	1702–1705	Flag of Poulo Condor under the English East India Company	Prior to the Acts of Union which created the Kingdom of Great Britain, the flag contained the St George's Cross in the canton representing the Kingdom of England. Influences:
	1863	Flag of the Diplomatic Delegation of Annam from Red Sea to France.	Yellow field with four red word "Đại-Nam khâm-sứ" (大南欽使). Influences:
	1887–1923	Flag of French colonial empire.	A vertical tricolour of blue, white, and red.
	1917	Flag of Daihung Empire.	Five red dots connected with saltire on a yellow field.
	c. 1900 – 9 March 1945	The protectorate flag of Annam and Tonkin.	French flag canton on a yellow field. Influences:
	1930–1931	Flag of the Red Guards (Nghe-Tinh Revolt).	Flag ratio: 2:3. Influences:
	January 15, 1931	Flag of the Indochinese Communist Party used at Vinh, Nghệ An.	The Chữ Hán "黨共產東洋" (Đảng Cộng sản Đông Dương) surrounding a hammer and a sickle. Slogans: 1 ° Increase in wages, reduction of the working day, reinstatement of the 21 workers made redundant; 2 ° Punishment of the strongmen and mandarins who harm the masses. Influences:
	1936–1945	Flag of the Hội Ánh Sáng.	Flag ratio: 2:3.
	1944–1945	Flag of the Đại Việt Quốc gia Liên minh.	A yellow field with three red stars.
	March 9 – August 14, 1945	Flag of Empire of Japan.	Flag ratio: 7:10. Disc is shifted 1% towards the hoist (left).
	1945–1960	Flag of Bình Xuyên.	A dark red banner and a small blue banner inside, a small yellow star centered on a blue banner (2:3). Influences:
	1947	Cờ Quẻ Càn (Note: During a meeting of Vietnamese nationalist parties (which were against the Việt Minh) in Hong Kong on February 17, 1947, Former emperor Bảo Đại ordered to connect the broken line in the middle of the Cờ Quẻ Ly to make the Cờ Quẻ Càn, the first hexagram in the Bát Quái Đồ. The Càn is a symbol of Heaven, the sovereign, and power, corresponding to the nation, ethnos and strength of the Vietnamese people. Bảo Đại proclaimed that from then on the Cờ Quẻ Càn would be the national flag of the independent and free Vietnam.)	A yellow field with three red stripes. The stripes formed the Quẻ Càn, or Qian trigram (☰). Influences:
	2 October 1955 – 1 November 1963	Flag of Vietnamese National Revolutionary Movement.	Flag ratio is 2:3.
	1961–1963	Flag of Vietnamese Republican Youth Movement (Thanh Nữ Cộng Hòa).	Flag ratio is 2:3.
	1965–1970	Flag of 4-T Union.	A large green four-leaf clover centered on a white field.
	1968–1973	Flag of National Progressive Movement.	Two horizontal red stripes enveloping a horizontal yellow stripe. The red arrow in the middle of the yellow stripe. Influences:
	1951–1960	Flag of Air Vietnam.	

=== Cultural flags ===
Flag	Duration	Use	Name/Description
		Vietnamese five-colour flags.	In Vietnamese culture, five-colour flags (Vietnamese: cờ ngũ sắc) or five elements flags (cờ ngũ hành) are traditionally flown during festivals and religious ceremonies. A five-colour flag consists of five concentric squares in red, green, yellow, and blue, representing the five elements (ngũ hành). The order of colours varies. The outermost square has three ragged edges, similar to fringing. The centre of the flag is sometimes defaced to commemorate a specific concept or personality. Historically, some imperial and military ensigns followed a similar pattern.
	April 30, 1975–	Vietnamese Heritage and Freedom Flag.	A yellow field with three red stripes (2:3). After the Fall of Saigon, the flag is continually used by some boat people and Overseas Vietnamese groups.
	1956–1975	Flag of Saint Trần. (Note: Unofficial flag that was at times used by the armed forces of South Vietnam.)	Adopted by the former Republic of Vietnam Navy.
		Funeral flag.	
		Catholic funeral flag.	

=== Monarchist flags ===
Flag	Duration	Use	Name/Description
		Vietnamese monarchist flag with a blue dragon.	Influences:
		Vietnamese monarchist flag with a green dragon.	Influences:

=== National flag proposals ===
Flag	First proposed	Name / Proposed by	Description
	c. 1912–1925	The Quốc kỳ Ngũ Tinh (國旗五星, "Five stars national flag") according to Tự phán, written by Phan Bội Châu.	Five red dots connected with saltire on a yellow background that is to symbolise the "yellow" race.
	1938–1940	Proposed flag for Vietnam by the Vietnam National Restoration League.	The word "King" (王, Vương) symbolises the constitutional monarchy. (Note: Despite fact that the monarchs of the Nguyễn dynasty were officially titled Hoàng Đế (黃帝, "Emperor") they were commonly referred to as Vương (王, "King") and/or Vua (君, "Sovereign") by the common people.) A red background symbolises struggle for independence. A white background symbolises "cleanliness of the people".
	27 May 1945	Flag proposal for the Empire of Vietnam in 1945 by Nguyễn Huyền Tĩnh on Trung Bắc Chủ nhật.	Three large yellow stripes represent the three regions of Vietnam, while two red stripes symbolize the shared bloodline of Lạc Hồng. The ratio is 3:4.
	17 January 1973	The Reconciliation Flag of Vietnam (Cờ Hoà Giải Của Nước Việt Nam). According to the Flags of the World website the creation of this flag is attributed Nguyễn Thành Trí and Tristan Nguyễn in Saigon (present-day Hồ Chí Minh City), South Vietnam in 1973, following the signing of the Paris Peace Accords. In the year 2007 it was later re-introduced in San Francisco, United States.	A vertical tricolour with the colours yellow-green-red and a white 12-pointed star in its centre. The colour yellow is supposed to be a symbol of both the continent of Asia and the Vietnamese people, the colour green symbolises peace, while the colour red symbolises the concept of "revolutionary enthusiasm". (Note: In this context "revolutionary enthusiasm" means the "readiness to make changes in order to improve the life".) The white star in the centre of the flag stands for freedom, peace, and national reconciliation. The points of the star correspond to the years of the âm lịch stands for the three values of freedom, equality, and pluralism – which are the values its advocates expect to be the most respected values in a new Vietnam (Tân Việt Nam). The ratio is 2:3.
	2013	An untitled flag proposal at a Vietnamese language website by a group of Vietnamese students from USA, Canada, and France, acknowledging the legitimacy of the current red and yellow flags of Vietnam.	The proposed flag is a horizontal tricolour with the colours white-red-white divided in the ratio of 1:2:1.

== Misattributed flags ==
This is a list of incorrect, fictitious or unknown flags which have been reported on as being factual and/or historical flags of Vietnam by contemporary or otherwise reputable sources.

=== Fictitious pre-Nguyễn royal flags ===
Flag	Supposed date	Supposed use	Origin of the misattribution
	939–968	Flag of the Ngô dynasty	Flag that is used by various medias to represent the Vietnamese Ngô dynasty.
Variation:	968–980	Flag of the Đinh dynasty	Flag that is used by various medias to represent the Vietnamese Đinh dynasty.
Variations:	980–1009; 1428–1527; 1533–1789	Flag of the Tiền Lê dynasty and the Hậu Lê dynasty	Flag that is used by various media to represent the Vietnamese Tiền Lê and Hậu Lê dynasties.
	1009–1225	Flag of the Lý dynasty	Flag that is used by various medias to represent the Vietnamese Lý dynasty.
Variation:	1225–1400; 1407–1414	Flag of the Trần dynasty and the short-lived Later Trần dynasty	Flag that is used by various medias to represent the Vietnamese Trần and Later Trần dynasties.
Variation:	1527–1627	Flag of the Mạc dynasty	Flag that is used by various medias to represent the Vietnamese Mạc dynasty.
Variation:	1558–1777	Flag of the Nguyễn lords at Đàng Trong.	Flag that is used by various medias to represent the Vietnamese Nguyễn-ruled Đàng Trong.
Variations:	1778–1788 1788–1802	Flag of the Tây Sơn dynasty	Flag that is used by various medias to represent the Vietnamese Tây Sơn dynasty. The flag was also used during festival and ceremony about the Tây Sơn dynasty (and its second emperor, Quang Trung) despite its questionable origin. The plain red banner was likely used as the Vietnamese battle flag, as evidenced in the Battle of Rạch Gầm-Xoài Mút, while virtually no studies or evidence existed for the variant with the centered yellow disk.
Variation:	40–43	Flag of the Trưng Vương dynasty	Flag drawn based on the traditional Đông Hồ painting.
	544–602	Flag of the Early Lý dynasty	One of the flags that is used by many Vietnameses to represent the historical Early Lý dynasty.
	1038–1039; 1041–1058	Flag of the Nungz lords.	One of the flags that is used to represent the historical Nungz clan.
	1527–1689	Flag of the Bầu lords at Tuyên Quang.	One of the flags that is used to represent the historical Vũ clan.

=== "Flag of Cochinchina" ===
Flag	Supposed date	Supposed use	Description	Origin of the misattribution
		Flag of Cochinchina.	Likely an imperial banner featuring various Sino-Vietnamese symbols such as the thái cực đồ symbol in the form of a spiral, among other symbols, likely the Tứ tượng, Lạc thư and the constellations.	
	1868–1945	Flag of French Cochinchina (sometimes as the flag of Annam).	A rectangular yellow flag with a jagged dark outline, known in Western heraldry as a bordure indented. It resembles a serrated ribbon typically found on Imperial Chinese and Vietnamese flags. Likely based on an old imperial Vietnamese (or Chinese) flag where the Europeans didn't know that the flag had a serrated ribbon and "filled it in" as a rectangle. The black triangles are sometimes blue or green based on different interpretations.	It was first described in the year 1825 and is still present in early 20th century depictions. However, the hydrographic service of the French navy, already in the charter of 1889, doesn't mention it; it is therefore believed that the existence of this flag, if it ever was authentic, does not go beyond 1883.
	1868–1945	Naval Ensign of Cochinchina.	Influences:	It was first described in the year 1825 and is still present in early 20th century depictions. However, the hydrographic service of the French navy, already in the charter of 1889, doesn't mention it; it is therefore believed that the existence of this flag, if it ever was authentic, does not go beyond 1883.

=== Modern flags ===
Flag	Supposed date	Supposed use	Description	Origin of the misattribution
Variations:	1802–1885	Flag of the Nguyễn dynasty, or flag of Vietnam under Nguyễn dynasty, or reportedly the flag of Tonkin.	Said flag can be found in a chart titled Generaale gezicht der Vlaggen welke meeste Natien ter Zee voeren "A general view of the flags which most nations bear at sea" between page viii and page 1 of the book Alegemeene verhandeling van de heerschappy der zee "General Treatise of the Dominion of the Sea"	Likely based on a flag stated to be flown on ships of the "nation" Tunquin in China. Tonkin was the European exonym during the 17th and 18th centuries for the northern region of modern Vietnam, then nominally reigned by the Revival Lê dynasty (1533–1789) yet effectively ruled by the Trịnh lords (1545–1787). The flag was also used in real life despite its questionable origin.
	1821–1922	Alleged standard of emperor Minh Mạng.	Yellow field with gold border.	Several plain yellow flags can be seen displayed along with the tricolour flags of France and a partially seen yellow flag containing red-coloured 大南 (SV: Đại Nam "Great South"), as depicted in the 1903 oil painting Les mandarins et les autorités françaises attendant l’arrivée de l’Empereur Thanh Thai "The mandarins and the French authorities awaiting the arrival of Emperor Thành Thái" by Trần D. Trọng
	1885–1890	Alleged flag of emperor Đồng Khánh.	Found in Nguyễn Đình Sài's article Quốc Kỳ Việt Nam: Nguồn Gốc và Lẽ Chính Thống "The National Flag of Viet Nam: Its Origin and Legitimacy". A visually similar is found on the webpage Vietnam from website Worldstatemen by UConn-affiliated researcher Ben Cahoon.	An incorrect reading of the Chinese characters 大南 (SV: Đại Nam "Great South") by foreigners with no experience with the script. The correct flag:
	1890–1920	National flag of Đại Nam	Đại Nam Quốc Kỳ (National flag of Đại Nam), claimed to have been originally issued by Emperor Thành Thái Alleged influences: A description was given that claimed that the flag had a number of symbolic meanings. Yellow, beyond the meaning of a royal symbol, is the traditional colour of Vietnamese nation and the colour of Vietnamese skin, red is the colour of Vietnamese blood together is the "red blood, yellow skin" (Note: Original Vietnamese: "Máu đỏ da vàng".) of the Vietnamese. three red stripes symbolised the united Vietnam under three regions Northern Vietnam (Bắc Kỳ), Central Vietnam (Trung Kỳ) and Southern Vietnam (Nam Kỳ)	The story behind this flag was fabricated by Nguyễn Đình Sài, a former member of the anti-Communist organization Việt Tân, who wrote the article "Quốc Kỳ Việt Nam: Nguồn Gốc và Lẽ Chính Thống” (The National Flag of Viet Nam: Its Origin and Legitimacy) in September 2004. To back up his claim, Nguyền Đình Sài cited a webpage from Worldstatesmen website by Ben Cahoon, an American researcher affiliated with University of Connecticut. However, Nguyễn Đình Sài admitted Cahoon "did not name any specific documents" (Note: Vietnamese original: "không trích dẫn rõ ràng tài liệu nào") for Cahoon's claim that the yellow flag with three red stripes was used between 1890 and 1920. Nguyễn Đình Sài fabricated this story so he could give the South Vietnamese flag more historical legitimacy by connecting it with anti-French resistance and national pride decades before it actually existed.
	1945	Flag of the Empire of Vietnam (a Japanese client state during World War II).	Inaccurate depiction of the Empire of Vietnam's national flag, Cờ Quẻ Ly "Li Trigram Flag", which is authentic. This inaccurate depiction has been present on the World Statesmen website since at least 2005, and was on Wikimedia Commons from 2006 to August 2021.	The correct design:

== Flag construction sheets ==
Flag	Use
	Flag of the Democratic Republic of Vietnam (1955 – 1976) and the Socialist Republic of Vietnam (from 1976).
	Flag of the Empire of Vietnam (3/1945 – 8/1945).
	Flag of the Autonomous Republic of Cochinchina (1946).
	Flag of the Autonomous Republic of Cochinchina (1946 – 1948).
	Flag of State of Vietnam (1949 – 1955) and Republic of Vietnam (1955 – 1975).
	Flag of the Sip Song Chau Tai (1947 – 1950) and Sip Hoc Chau Thai (1950 – 1955).

== See also ==
- Emblem of Vietnam § List
- List of flags of French Indochina
- Vietnamese five-color flags
