= Emblem of Vietnam =

National Emblem of the Socialist Republic of Vietnam
- Armiger: Socialist Republic of Vietnam
- Adopted: 30 November 1955 (D.R. Vietnam); 2 July 1976 (S.R. Vietnam; current version)
- Motto: CỘNG HÒA XÃ HỘI CHỦ NGHĨA VIỆT NAM ("Socialist Republic of Vietnam")
- Earlier version
- Use: Emblem of North Vietnam (1956–1976)

The National Emblem of the Socialist Republic of Vietnam (Vietnamese: Quốc huy nước Cộng hòa Xã hội chủ nghĩa Việt Nam, lit. 'State emblem of the nation of Socialist Republic of Vietnam'), or simply the emblem of Vietnam and State emblem (Quốc huy), is one of the official national symbols formally representing the Socialist Republic of Vietnam since 1976. A prominent example of the socialist-style heraldic family, the Vietnamese national emblem is designed circular and based on the symbolism of the Vietnamese national flag, having a red background and a yellow star in the middle which represent the five main classes in Vietnamese society—intellectuals, farmers, workers, business people and military personnel; the revolutionary history and bright future of Vietnam. The cog and crops represent the cooperation of agriculture and industrial labor.

According to the Constitution of Vietnam:

The national emblem of the Socialist Republic of Vietnam is circular in shape; in the middle of a red background is a five-pointed golden star framed by rice ears below which is half a cogwheel and the inscription: Socialist Republic of Vietnam".

— The 1992 Constitution of Vietnam, Article 142

== History ==
=== Democratic Republic of Vietnam ===
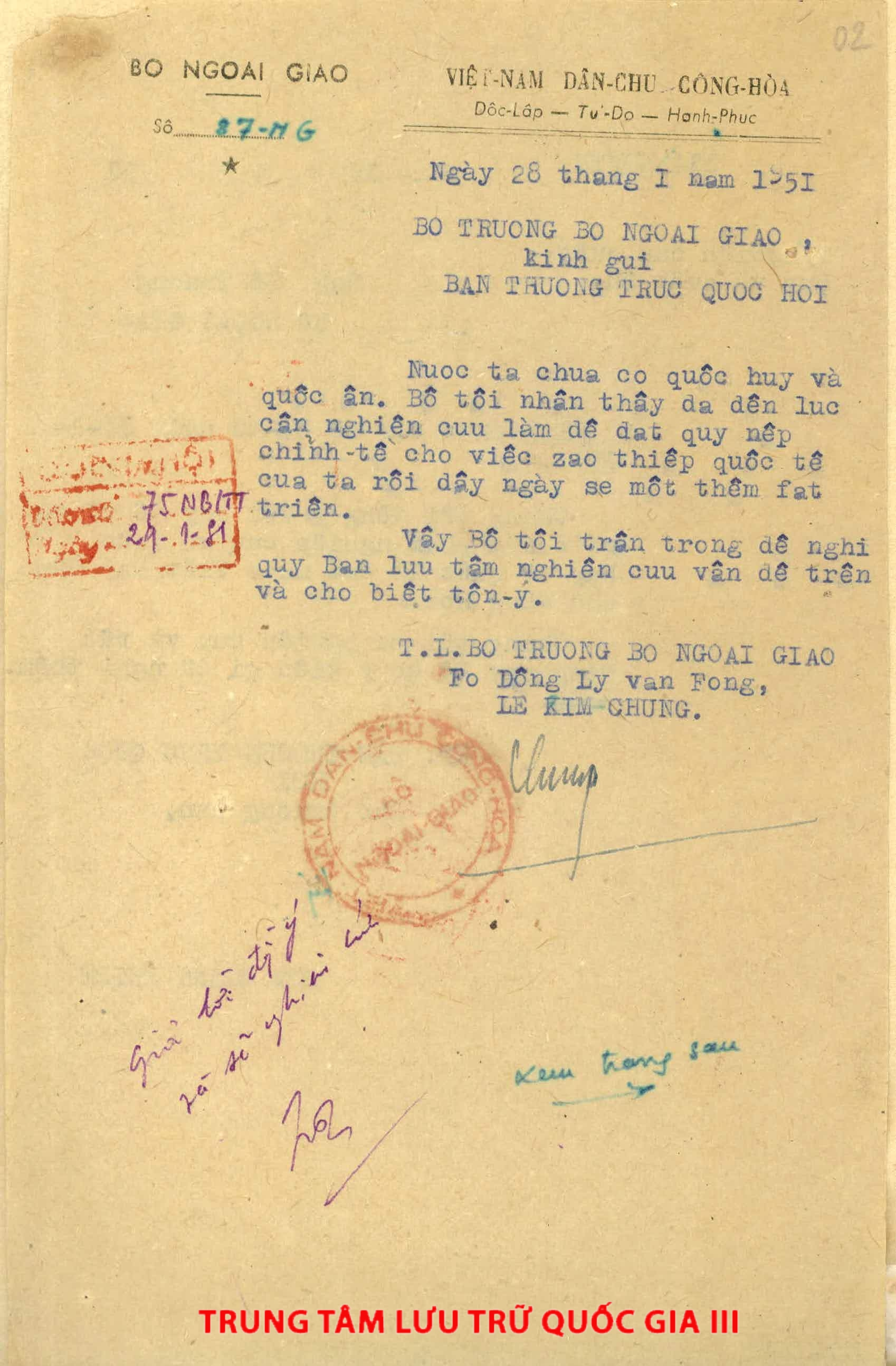
A document issued by the Ministry of Foreign Affairs calling for the creation of a national emblem and a national seal for the Democratic Republic of Vietnam (dated 28 January 1951)

During the 1950s, a number of countries around the world established diplomatic relations with the Democratic Republic of Vietnam. In order to expand relations with other countries and affirm Vietnam's sovereignty through diplomatic activities, the Ministry of Foreign Affairs has sent an official dispatch to the National Assembly Standing Committee on the creation of the national emblem. The Workers' Party of North Vietnam and the North Vietnamese government advocated for the creation of a national emblem "to achieve orderliness for international dealings". The coat of arms was designed by artist Bùi Trang Chước and was edited by artist Trần Văn Cẩn.

North Vietnam adopted its national emblem on 30 November 1955.

In June 1953 Bùi Trang Chước entered a contest to design the national emblem of the Democratic Republic of Vietnam, in which he submitted 112 different detailed research drawings, sketches and pencil drawings. Of his submissions 15 sketches were selected by the Central Committee of Fine Arts and Arts and sent to the Ministry of Propaganda for submission to the Prime Minister in October 1954.

Since Vietnam is a communist state, the design closely resembles the emblem of the People's Republic of China and is also based on the coat of arms of the Soviet Union.

Issuance of the national emblem in North Vietnam

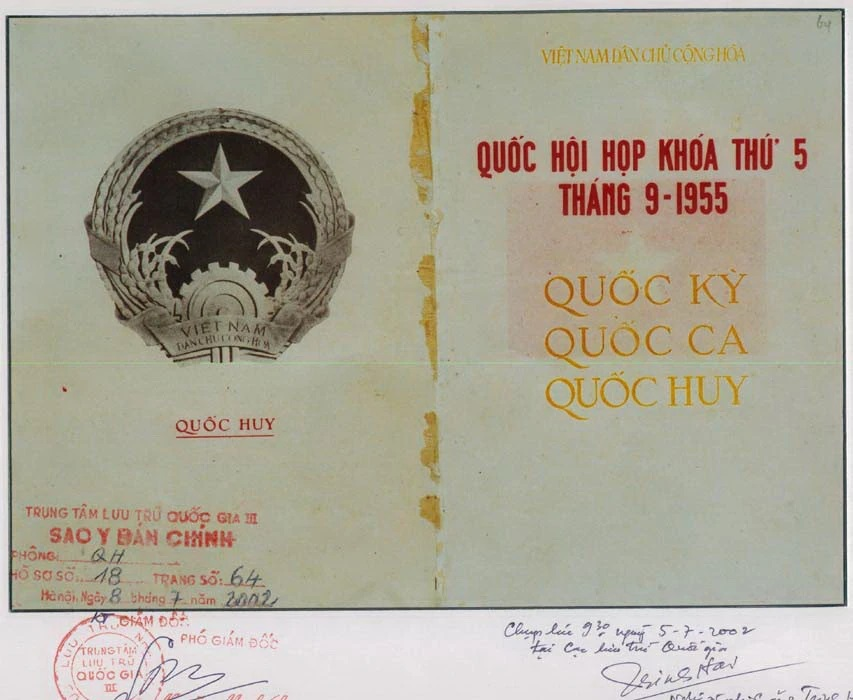
The initial emblem design approved by the National Assembly of Vietnam on September of 1955.

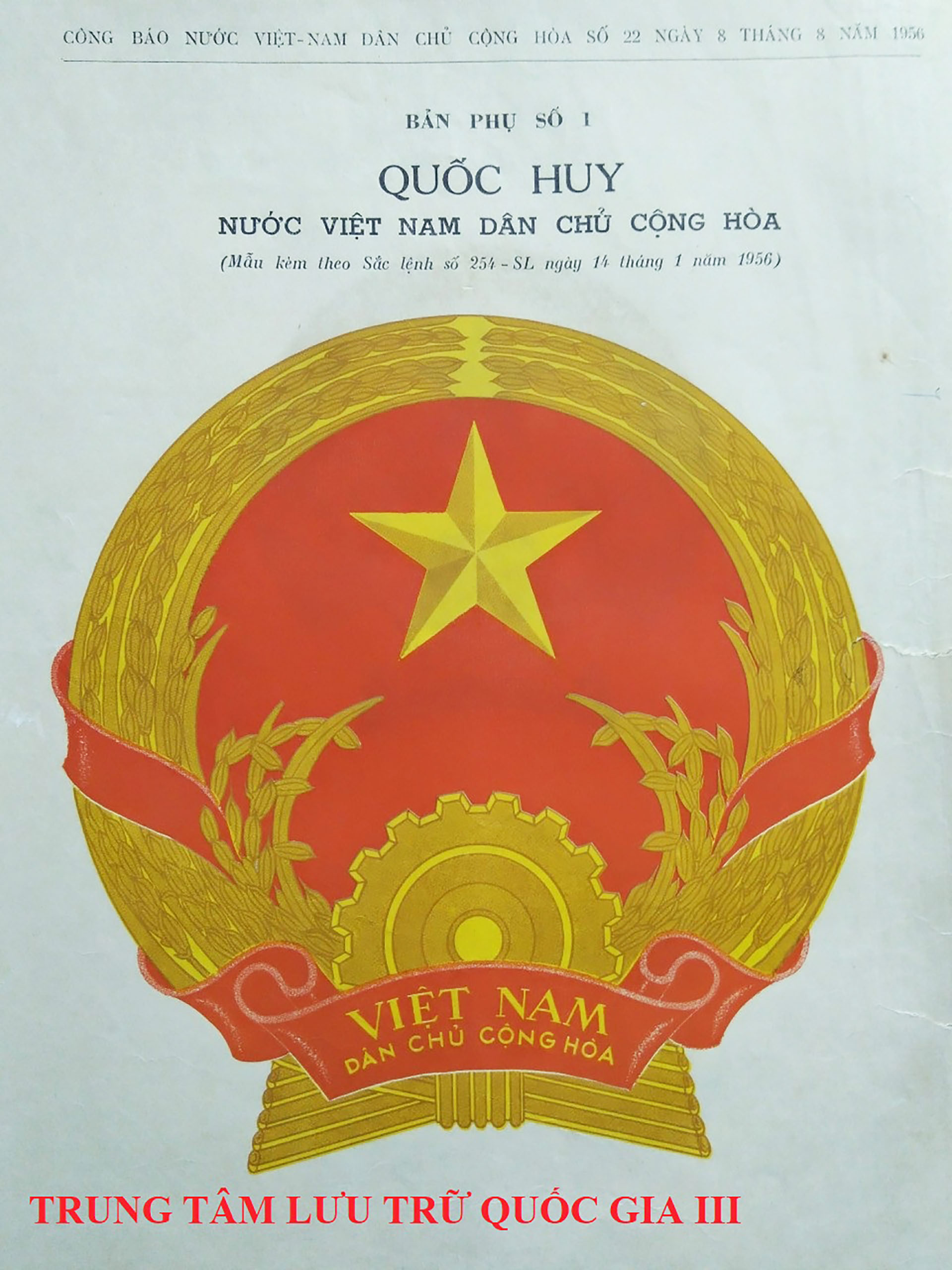
The revised emblem was issued and made effective by Ho Chi Minh's office on January 1956, which has then become the standardised design for the Vietnamese emblem until now.

Later, in his memoir "I draw the model of the National Emblem" (Tôi vẽ mẫu Quốc huy) by Bùi Trang Chước published on 26 April 1985, he wrote: "My last sketch of the [North] Vietnamese National Emblem back then was for presentation. In a circular shape, the two sides are surrounded by Vietnamese rice grains with some rice flowers hanging inside holding an anvil at the bottom, symbolising agriculture. Under the anvil is a silk strip that later received the words "Democratic Republic of Vietnam" (Việt Nam Dân chủ Cộng hòa). The two ends of the silk strip wrap the two sides of the rice flower from the bottom up, each side two segments. In the upper centre in the background is a yellow star superimposed on a red background, under the star near the center of the background is an arc of the sun with rays around it, evoking an image of dawn." He noted that his entire National Emblem design uses only two colours yellow and red, the traditional colours of the nation.

After sending this sketch for comment to the North Vietnamese president Hồ Chí Minh a number of corrections were requested. President Hồ Chí Minh commented that: "The image of the anvil is an individual handicraft, so the image should be replaced with something that represents modern industry." After three edits, from early 1955 to September 1955, painter Bùi Trang Chước completed the model.

Regarding this last sample of the North Vietnamese national emblem, artist Bùi Trang Chước wrote: "This time I also drew a circle around the two sides, there are more rice flowers extending upwards, adjacent to the border. Each of them are located at the top of the circle, the two sides still keep the rice flowers hanging down to embrace now a cogwheel rather than an anvil. At the bottom, the silk ribbon in the middle has the words Việt Nam Dân chủ Cộng hòa ("Democratic Republic of Vietnam"). The silk ribbon is still wrapped on the rice stalks with 2 sections on each side, the roots of the rice flowers cross each other to form the emblem." The sun below the star and its rays were also removed. In terms of colour, the background inside of the North Vietnamese National Emblem and the silk medal is red, while other motifs such as the rice flowers, stars and wheels are yellow.

After the 5th National Assembly session (September 1955) gave advice to correct a few minor details before the national emblem could be approved. But because at the time Bùi Trang Chước had to accept the government's secret mission to the People's Republic of China to draw and paint designs for the new banknotes, the editing of a few details (such as the lengthening of the rice stalks from the base to the sole) was assigned to artist Trần Văn Cẩn.

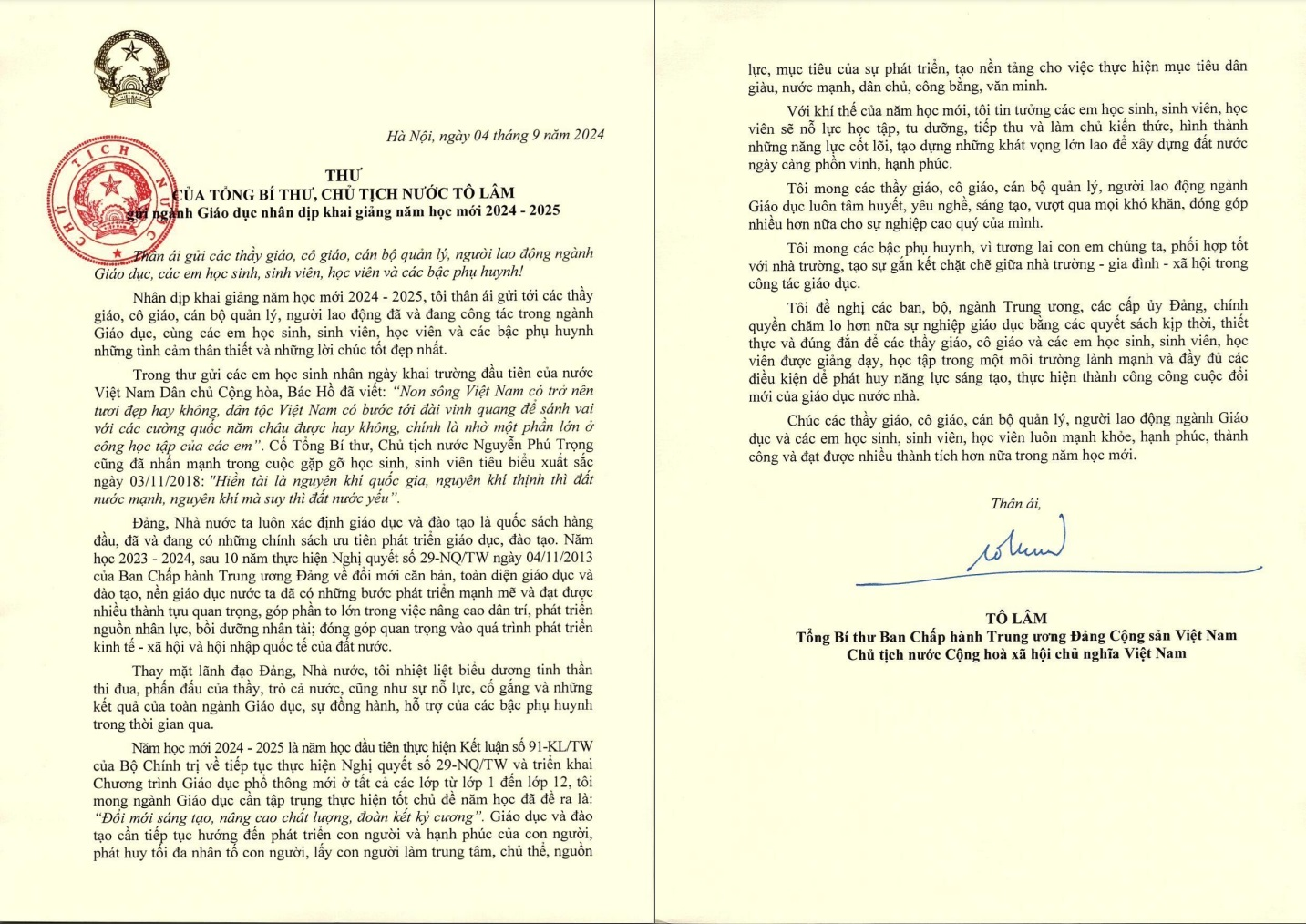
The national emblem can be used as both a formal decoration and a government seal, as seen on this 2024 presidential letter from Tô Lâm.

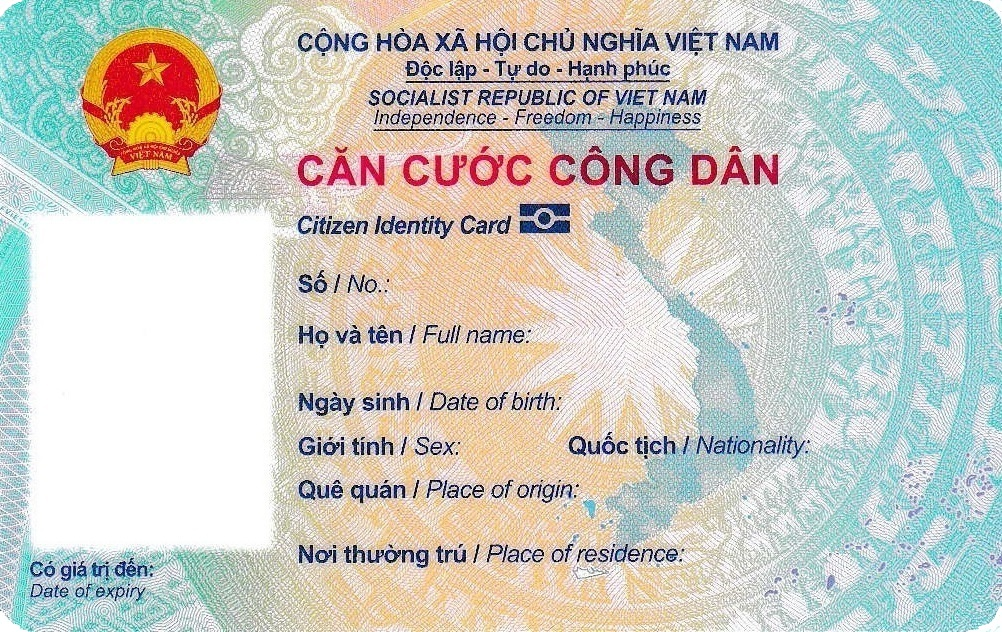
Presentations of the national emblem are also featured on most state-issued identity cards and other formal documentations.

=== Socialist Republic of Vietnam ===
Following the merger of the Democratic Republic of Vietnam with the Republic of South Vietnam on 2 July 1976, a slightly modified version was adopted by the newly established Socialist Republic of Vietnam. The new version replaced the wording "Việt Nam Dân chủ Cộng hòa" with "Cộng hòa Xã hội chủ nghĩa Việt Nam". In 2007 a representative of the National Assembly of Vietnam, the artist Trần Khánh Chương, commented that the printing process of Vietnam's national emblems featured too many errors and problems, resulting in many inaccurate "versions". Notable errors included: the rice corn is too big (just like the wheat corn), the gear only has six teeth instead of ten, the circles inside the gear are not accurate, and the space between the rice corn appears uneven.

A physical representation of the Vietnamese Emblem on the National Assembly House.

On 25 December 2021 the Prime Minister of Vietnam issued Quyết định số 2198/QĐ-TTg (Decision No. 2198/QD-TTg) on the recognition of National Treasures which declared the collections of the 1953–1955 North Vietnamese national emblem proposals by Bùi Trang Chước as a national treasure, these sketches are currently (as of December 2022) kept at the National Archives Center III, Department of State Records and Archives, Ministry of Home Affairs. After this decision these sketches were put on public display as a part of the "Ký ức của bạn, lịch sử của chúng ta" ("Your memory – Our history") exhibition. To aid researchers (both Vietnamese and foreign) the National Archives Center III plans on digitising the North Vietnamese national emblem proposals and make them publicly available online.

=== Others ===
==== Nguyễn dynasty ====
The national coat of arms of the Nguyễn dynasty was introduced during the reign of the Thành Thái Emperor after the imperial court in Huế ordered ceramics from the French Alfred Hache & Co. porcelain factory in Vierzon, Cher department and Paris in 1903, this coat of arms featured a scroll with the country's name (國號, quốc hiệu), Đại Nam (大南), supported by a five-clawed dragon and a horizontal sword. These ceramics were then used to service foreign delegates visiting Huế on diplomatic missions. As coats of arms were considered national symbols representing the sovereignty of a country in international relations, the usage of "Đại Nam coat of arms" was considered not unexpected of nationalism while the country was under French domination.

Later during the Khải Định period a different version of their coat of arms appears on blue porcelains produced by the Manufacture nationale de Sèvres.

Personalised versions of the coat of arms were also used during the Khải Định and Bảo Đại periods. Khải Định's imperial seal contained a version of the imperial coat of arms but with the six Chinese characters "Khải Định Đại Nam Hoàng đế" (啟定大南皇帝) on the scroll instead of the country's name. During the Bảo Đại period the scroll only contained two Chinese characters bearing the reign era of the emperor. His personal coat of arms continued to be used by members of the House of Nguyễn Phúc after the abolition of the Nguyễn dynasty.

==== State of Vietnam ====
The coat of arms of the State of Vietnam (which after the 1954 Geneva Agreements became known as "South Vietnam") featured a blue dragon (a symbol of the Nguyễn dynasty) on an escutcheon (shield) of yellow and red stripes.

== List ==
Historical heraldry
Symbol	Use	Duration	Description
Ancient period
	Bronze drum of Văn Lang (Đông Sơn culture), attributed to the legendary Hồng Bàng dynasty.	600 BCE or earlier – 258 BCE	The patterns on the Đông Sơn drums bear a realistic style and show stilted houses, dancing people, people pounding rice, beating drums, and sailing, together with animals and birds. The scenes depict daily life of ancient Việt and reflect the contemporary artistic talent and mind. (Note: The Đông Sơn drums were used as musical instruments in festivals, such as prayers for rain, for good harvest and rituals, such as weddings and funerals, as well as to command in an army. They were also used as funerary objects and as symbols of power of tribal leaders.)
	Imperial seal of Emperor Văn of Nam Việt.	137 BCE – 124 BCE	The inscription Văn đế hành tỉ (文帝行璽) written in seal script.
Imperial Vietnam
	Seal of the Nguyễn lords, later imperial seal of the Nguyễn dynasty.	1709–1777, 1780–1802 (Nguyễn lords); 1802–1846 (Nguyễn dynasty)	The inscription Đại Việt quốc Nguyễn Chúa vĩnh trấn chi bảo (大越國阮𪐴永鎮之寶, "Seal of the eternal government of the Nguyễn Lords of the Kingdom of Great(er) Viêt") written in seal script.
	Imperial seal of the Tây Sơn dynasty.		The inscription Triều đường chi ấn (朝堂之印, "Seal of the Court") written in seal script.
	Imperial seal of the Nguyễn dynasty.	1846–1945	The inscription Đại Nam thụ thiên vĩnh mệnh truyền quốc tỷ (大南受天永命傳國璽, "The Great South has the eternal Mandate of Heaven, jade seal for the transmission of the legacy of the Empire") written in seal script.
Colonial Vietnam
	Seal of French Cochinchina and later French Indochina.	1879–1954	The Great Seal of France with minor localisations. On the colonial seal a sheaf of rice replaces the traditional French symbols for agriculture (a sheaf of wheat), the arts (painter's tools), and science (burning lamp). On the right side of the seal the branches of oak were replaced by an anchor, (Note: The anchor symbolises the fact that colony of French Cochinchina was initially under the supervision of the Ministry of the Navy and the Colonies.) and the removal of the Gallic cock on the rudder. Furthermore, and of symbolic importance, the urn symbolising universal suffrage on the French Great Seal was omitted from the colonial seal. Influences:
	Coat of arms of French Cochinchina.		A blazon shield with many blue triangles, resembling a serrated ribbon typically found on Imperial Chinese and Vietnamese flags, surrounding a black interior. Influences:
	Great seal of the viceroy of the French protectorate of Tonkin.	1886–1897	The inscription Khâm sai đại thần quan phòng (欽差大臣關防, "Quan phòng (seal) of the Imperial Commissioner") written in seal script.
	Coat of arms of the French protectorate of Annam.		A sword per fess charged with a scroll, inscribed with two Traditional Chinese characters (大南) and supported by a single Vietnamese dragon.
	Variant coat of arms of the French protectorate of Annam.		A golden five-clawed dragon positioned affronté. Influences:
	Emblem of the Government-General of French Indochina.		The letters GGI standing for "Gouvernement général de l'Indochine".
	The Vietnamese-style seal of the Government-General of French Indochina.		The inscription Đại Pháp Quốc Khâm mệnh Tổng thống Đông Dương Toàn quyền đại thần quan nho (大法國欽命總統東洋全權大臣關伩) written in seal script. (Note: An older version of this Great Seal has a decorative meander border design.)
North Vietnam
	Emblem of the Democratic Republic of Vietnam.	30 November 1955 – 2 July 1976	Circular in shape; in the middle of a red background is a five-pointed gold star framed by rice ears below which is half a cog wheel and the inscription "Việt Nam Dân chủ Cộng hòa" (Democratic Republic of Vietnam).
Autonomous Republic of Cochinchina
	Coat of arms of the Autonomous Republic of Cochinchina.	1946–1948	Or, a pale Azure charged with two pallets Argent.
Provisional Central Government of Vietnam
	Coat of arms of the Provisional Central Government of Vietnam.	1948–1949	The pale and pallets of the South Vietnamese flag (Cờ vàng ba sọc đỏ), arranged vertically in an escutcheon.
State of Vietnam
	Grand Seal of the State of Vietnam. (Note: Technically the personal seal of the chief of state of Vietnam, Bảo Đại.)	1949–1954	A seal with the inscription "Quốc-gia Việt-Nam – Đức Bảo Đại – Quốc-trưởng" written in Latin script and "保大國長" (top-to-bottom, right-to-left) in seal script.
	Coat of arms of the State of Vietnam.	1954 – 26 October 1955	The pale and pallets gules of the South Vietnamese flag (Cờ vàng ba sọc đỏ), arranged vertically in an escutcheon or, bordured gules, and charged with a Vietnamese dragon azure passant. Influences:
	Variant coat of arms of the State of Vietnam as it appeared on its passports (image). This passport design was used by South Vietnam as late as 1957.	1954 – 26 October 1955	The pale and pallets of the South Vietnamese flag (Cờ vàng ba sọc đỏ), arranged vertically in an escutcheon and charged with a Vietnamese dragon passant. In this case, the pale, the pallets, the dragon and the escutcheon bordure are all or. Influences:
	Variant coat of arms of the State of Vietnam.	1954 – 26 October 1955	The pale and pallets of the South Vietnamese flag (Cờ vàng ba sọc đỏ), arranged vertically in an escutcheon and charged with a Vietnamese dragon azure passant. Influences:
South Vietnam
First Republic of Vietnam
	Seal of South Vietnam.	26 October 1955 – 1957	Bushes of bamboo growing on a hill.
	Emblem of South Vietnam.	1957 – 1 November 1963	Bushes of bamboo and a scroll with the inscription "VIỆT-NAM", encompassing an ink brush (representing civil mandarins) and a sword (representing military mandarins). A coloured version of this coat of arms shows the background yellow, the bamboo green and the bordure red.
	Escutcheon of South Vietnam.	1957 – 1 November 1963	Bushes of bamboo vert and a scroll argent with the inscription "VIỆT-NAM CỘNG-HÒA", encompassing an ink brush (representing civil mandarins) and a sword (representing military mandarins); both of which are proper. A coloured version of this coat of arms shows the background or, the bamboo vert and the bordure gules. Influences: and
	Lesser coat of arms of South Vietnam. (Note: This version was earlier used on the insignia of the Vietnamese Army (Việt binh đoàn) of the Provisional Central Government of Vietnam and the Vietnamese National Guard (Vệ binh Quốc gia) of the State of Vietnam.)	26 October 1955 – 1 November 1963	The bend and bendlets sinister of the South Vietnamese flag (Cờ vàng ba sọc đỏ) in an escutcheon. Influences:
	Variant coat of arms of South Vietnam used on its passports (image). (Note: Continued to be used during the Second Republic period.)	– 30 April 1975	Bushes of bamboo growing on a hill in an escutcheon with the text "Việt-Nam Cộng-Hòa" inscribed in a scroll above the bamboo and the text also appearing below the bamboo. In this case, all of these, and the bordure of the escutcheon, are or. Influences: and
Second Republic of Vietnam
	Coat of arms of South Vietnam as it appeared on the presidential seal that was used between 1967 and 1975 (image).	1967 – 30 April 1975	The pale and pallets of the South Vietnamese flag (Cờ vàng ba sọc đỏ), arranged vertically in an escutcheon supported by two dragons azure. Influences:
	Variant coat of arms of South Vietnam.	1967 – 30 April 1975	The pale and pallets of the South Vietnamese flag (Cờ vàng ba sọc đỏ), arranged vertically in an escutcheon supported by two dragons or. Influences:
	Escutcheon of South Vietnam. (Note: Also used in military insignia during the Second Republic period.)	1 November 1963 – 30 April 1975	The pale and pallets of the South Vietnamese flag (Cờ vàng ba sọc đỏ), arranged vertically in an escutcheon. Influences:
Việt Cộng and the Republic of South Vietnam
	Emblem of the Liberation Army of South Vietnam (NLF).		A disc of the colours of the flag (red and blue), the five-pointed star surrounded by ears of rice and a cogwheel in base. Influences:
	Achievement of the National Liberation Front of South Vietnam (NLF).		An achievement of the Việt Cộng consisted of a disc of the colours of the flag (red and blue), the five-pointed star surrounded by ears of rice and a cogwheel in base. The disc was supported by six Việt Cộng flags, with three flags on each side. Influences:
Socialist Republic of Vietnam
	Emblem of the Socialist Republic of Vietnam.	2 July 1976 – present	Circular in shape; in the middle of a red background is a five-pointed gold star framed by rice ears below which is half a cog wheel and the inscription "Cộng hòa Xã hội chủ nghĩa Việt Nam" (Socialist Republic of Vietnam). Influences:
Other
	Seal of Trấn Tây Thành, the Nguyễn dynasty occupation of Cambodia.	1838	The inscription Trấn Tây tướng quân chi ấn (鎭西將軍之印, "Seal of the general of Trấn Tây") written in seal script.
	Coat of arms of the Kingdom of Sedang.	1888–1890	
	Seal of the Kingdom of Sedang.	1888–1890	
	Seal of the Tai Principality under Nguyễn dynasty and French rule.	1889–1945	
	Arms of Sip Song Chau Tai.	1948–1955	
	Coat of arms of the Domain of the Crown.	1950–1955	A dragon surrounded by clouds.
	Coat of arms of the Nùng Autonomous Territory.	1950s	A shield depicting a black junk boat sailing on water. The background is coloured green and red and depicts the golden Chinese characters Trung Hiếu (忠孝, "loyalty", "Filial piety").

== See also ==
- Flag of Vietnam
- List of flags of Vietnam
- List of Vietnamese provincial and territorial symbols
- National Emblem of China
- Seals of the Nguyễn dynasty
- Socialist-style emblems
