= Kingdom of Sedang =

Defunct nineteenth-century kingdom in Indochina

- 1888–1890
- Flag Coat of arms

- Seal

- The Kingdom of Sedang on the green dot
- Capital: Kon Gung
- Common languages: Sedang; French
- Government: Constitutional monarchy
- King
  - 1888–1890: Charles-Marie I
- History
  - Declared: 3 June 1888
  - Death of David de Mayréna: 11 November 1890

Area
  - Total: 30,000–50,000 km^{2} (12,000–19,000 sq mi)
- Currency: Math / Mouk
- Time zone: UTC+8
| Succeeded by |
| Confederation of Sedang; Sedang Regency |
- Today part of: Vietnam

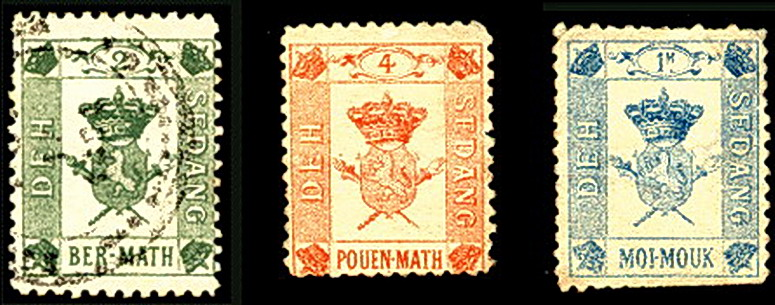
Stamps of Sedang, featuring its coat of arms.

The Kingdom of Sedang (French: Royaume des Sedangs; Vietnamese: Vương quốc Xơ Đăng) was an ephemeral political entity established in the latter part of the 19th century by a French adventurer, Charles-Marie David de Mayréna, in part of what is present-day Vietnam.

== History ==
Mayréna, a former French government official with a dubious history that allegedly involved embezzlement, was in 1888 the owner of a plantation in French Indochina. When the King of Siam began claiming territories near those held by the French, Mayréna convinced the nervous colonial administrator to have him lead an expedition into the interior in order to negotiate treaties with local tribes.

However, upon his arrival, he instead convinced the tribesmen to form a local kingdom under his rule. To justify this, he argued that the tribes involved were not subjects or vassals of the emperor of Annam (modern Vietnam), and hence had a right to independent statehood. The Kingdom of Sedang, as he named it, incorporated the Bahnar, Rengao, and Sedang ethnics. Mayréna was elected King by the chiefs of these tribes, established his capital at the village of Kon Gung (also called Pelei Agna, "Great City", now in Đắk Mar commune), and assumed the regnal name of Marie the First, King of the Sedang, on 3 June 1888.

He subsequently offered to cede his kingdom to the French Third Republic in exchange for monopoly trade rights and hinted that the Prussians were interested if the French were not. When the French government failed to respond positively, Mayréna approached the British in Hong Kong. When he was rebuffed there he traveled to Belgium, where in 1889 a financier offered to provide him with arms and money in exchange for the kingdom's mineral rights. Mayréna's return to Sedang was thwarted by the French Navy, who blockaded Vietnamese ports and seized his arms as contraband at Singapore.

During his travels to Southeast Asia and Europe, Mayréna awarded dozens of noble titles, orders of chivalry, and assorted medals and paraphernalia to his supporters. He also created a series of postage stamps that are the main tangible legacy of the kingdom.

Mayréna (who had earlier converted to Islam and married several local women) died under mysterious circumstances (various reports claim by poisoning, snakebite or losing a duel) on 11 November 1890 at Tioman, Malaya.

== See also ==
- Xo Dang people
