= Vietnamese five-color flags =

Traditional flags for festivals and religious ceremonies

Cờ ngũ sắc
- Use: Other
- Proportion: 1:1

- Vietnamese five-color flags
- Vietnamese alphabet: Cờ ngũ sắc
- Chữ Hán: 旗五色

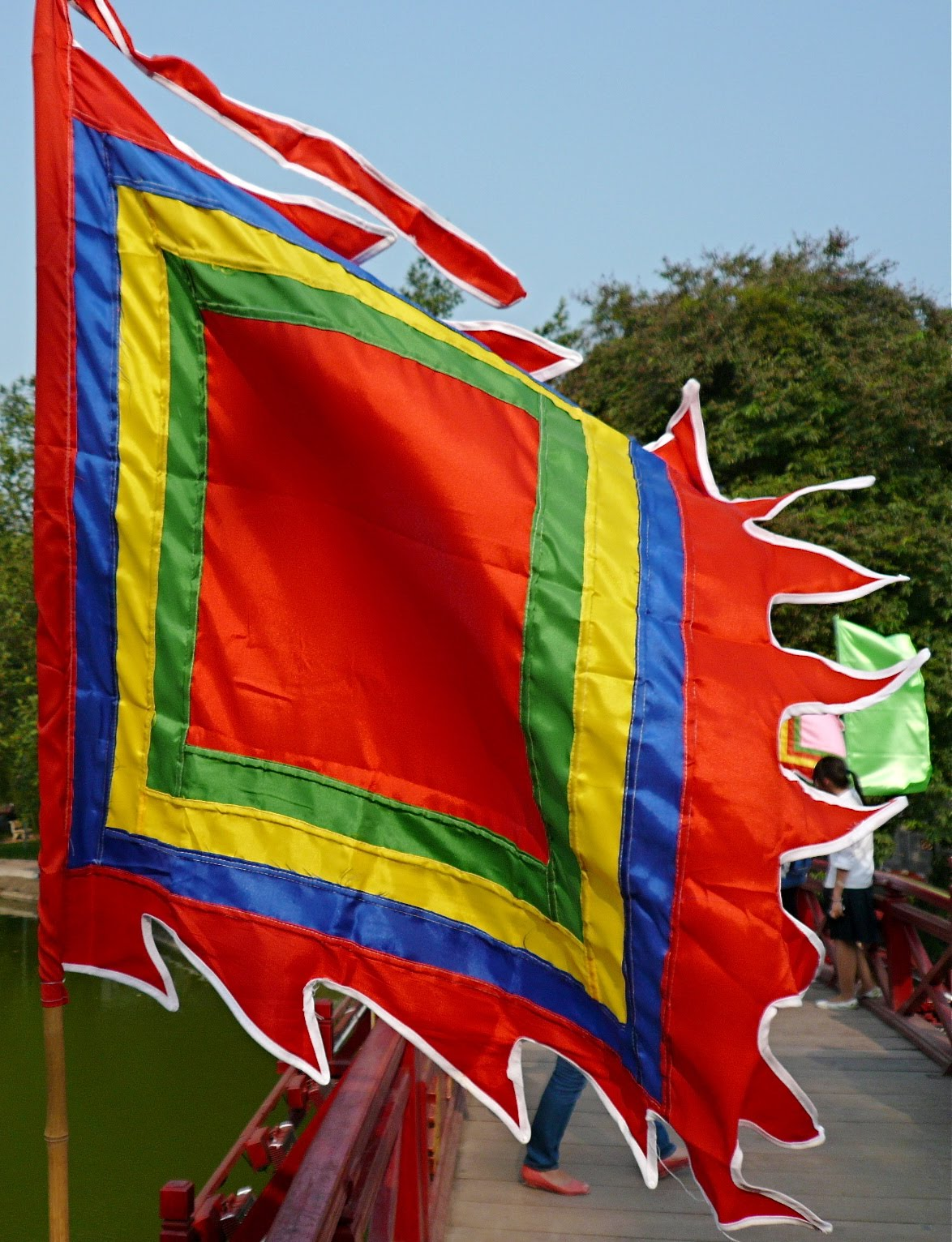
A five-color flag at a festival in 2010 commemorates the millennial of the founding of Hanoi.

In Vietnamese culture, five-color flags (Vietnamese: cờ ngũ sắc, chữ Hán: 旗五色) or five elements flags (Vietnamese: cờ ngũ hành, chữ Hán: 旗五行), deity flag (Vietnamese: cờ thần, chữ Hán: 旗神) are traditionally flown during festivals and religious ceremonies. A five-color flag consists of five concentric squares in red, green, yellow, blue, and white representing the five elements fire, green, earth, water, and metal. The order of colors varies. The outermost square has three ragged edges, similar to fringing.

Historically, some imperial and military ensigns followed a similar pattern.

== Variations ==
Imperial ensign of the Nguyễn dynasty (1802–1955)

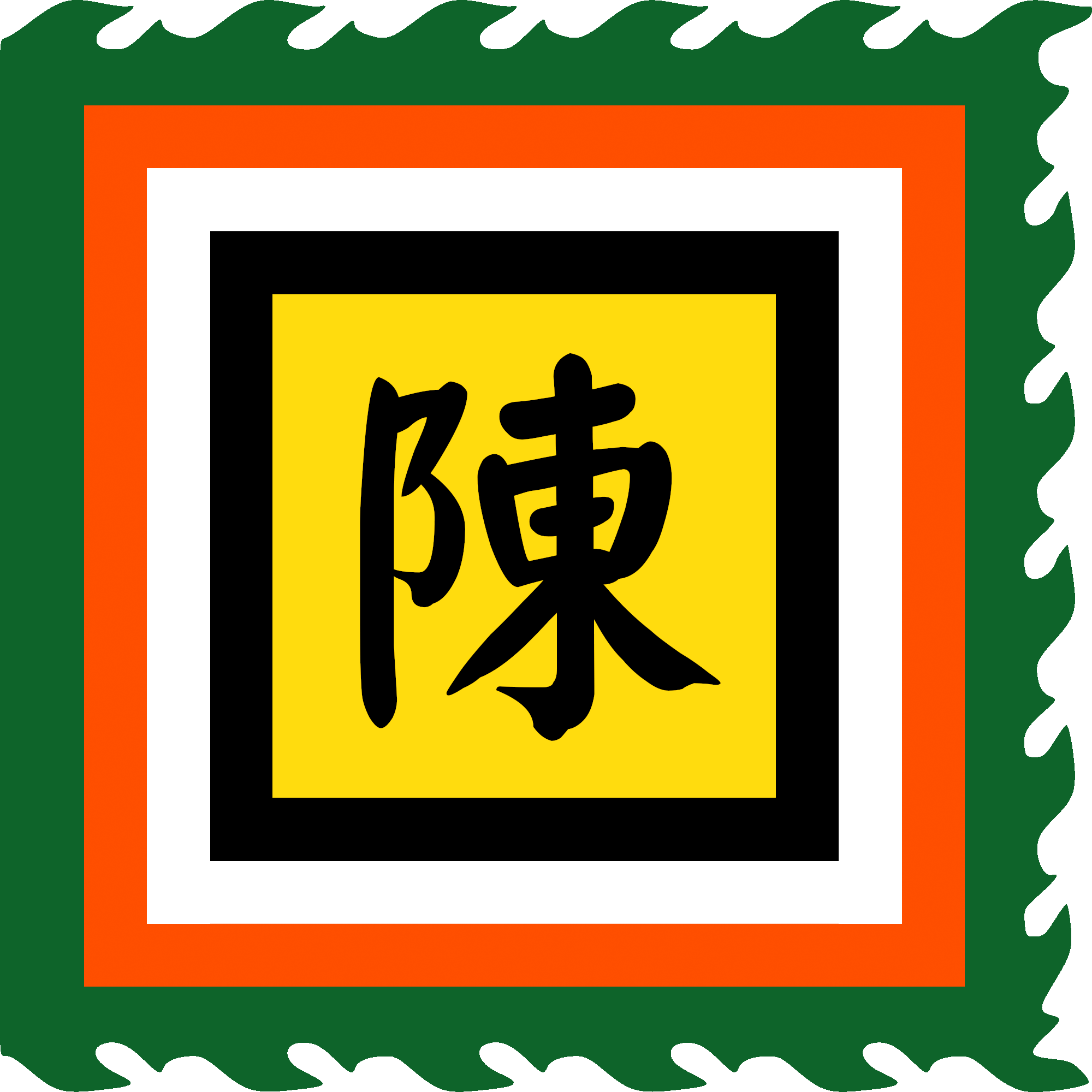
Flag of Thánh Trần (1956–1975) used by the South Vietnamese Navy

Funeral flag

Catholic funeral flag

Catholic funeral flag (Good Friday variant)

== See also ==
- List of flags of Vietnam
