= Văn Thánh Temple, Cao Lãnh =

Văn Thánh Miếu
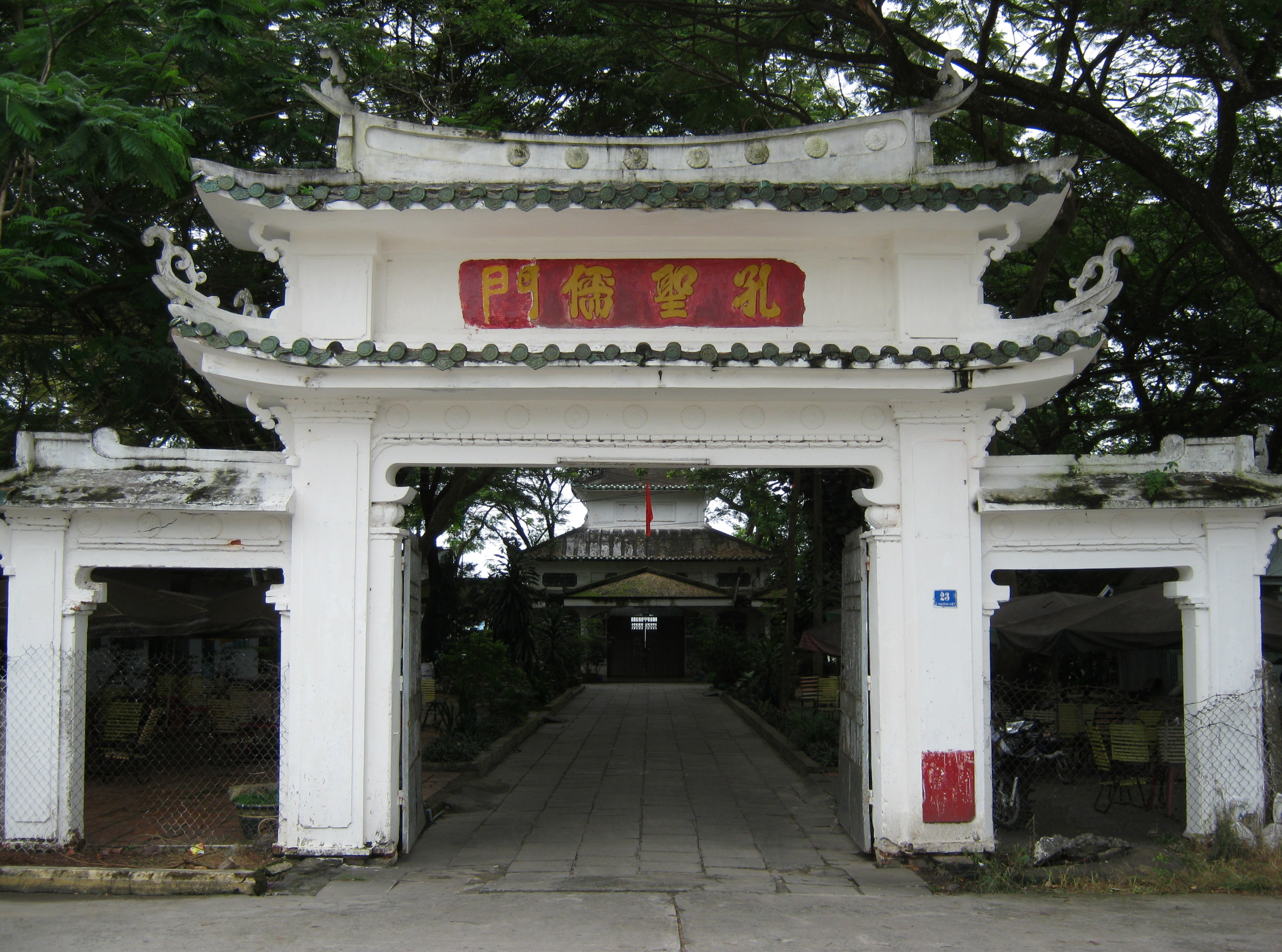
- Văn Thánh Miếu's main entrance

Religion
- Affiliation: Confucianism
- Province: Sa Đéc
- Region: Mekong Delta

Location
- Location: Cao Lãnh, Vietnam
- Interactive map of Văn Thánh Miếu
- Coordinates: 10.4616°N 105.6350°E

Văn Thánh Miếu is a Confucian temple located in Cao Lãnh, Vietnam, the capital city of the Đồng Tháp Province. Located near the Mekong River Delta, the Văn Thánh Miếu of Cao Lãnh has a culture of worshiping Confucius, for nearly 150 years ago.

== Establishment ==
Construction of the temple started on October 28, 1857 in Mỹ Trà, Cao Lãnh. The temple's altar is gilded with plaques that honor Confucius, and many hanging column scrolls. Due to the war, the temple became inactive and was abandoned in 1951. After 1975, Văn Thánh Miếu has been used as a library in the province. Today, the area surrounding the Văn Thánh Miếu is a large park, called the Park of Văn Miếu (Vietnamese: Công viên Văn Miếu). The library provides books in addition to supplying research materials, equipped with 40 computers, and free service to people in need. The temple displays its prized collection of poetry to promote art and oriental moral discussions, looking in the direction of preserving Confucian teachings.

== Gallery ==
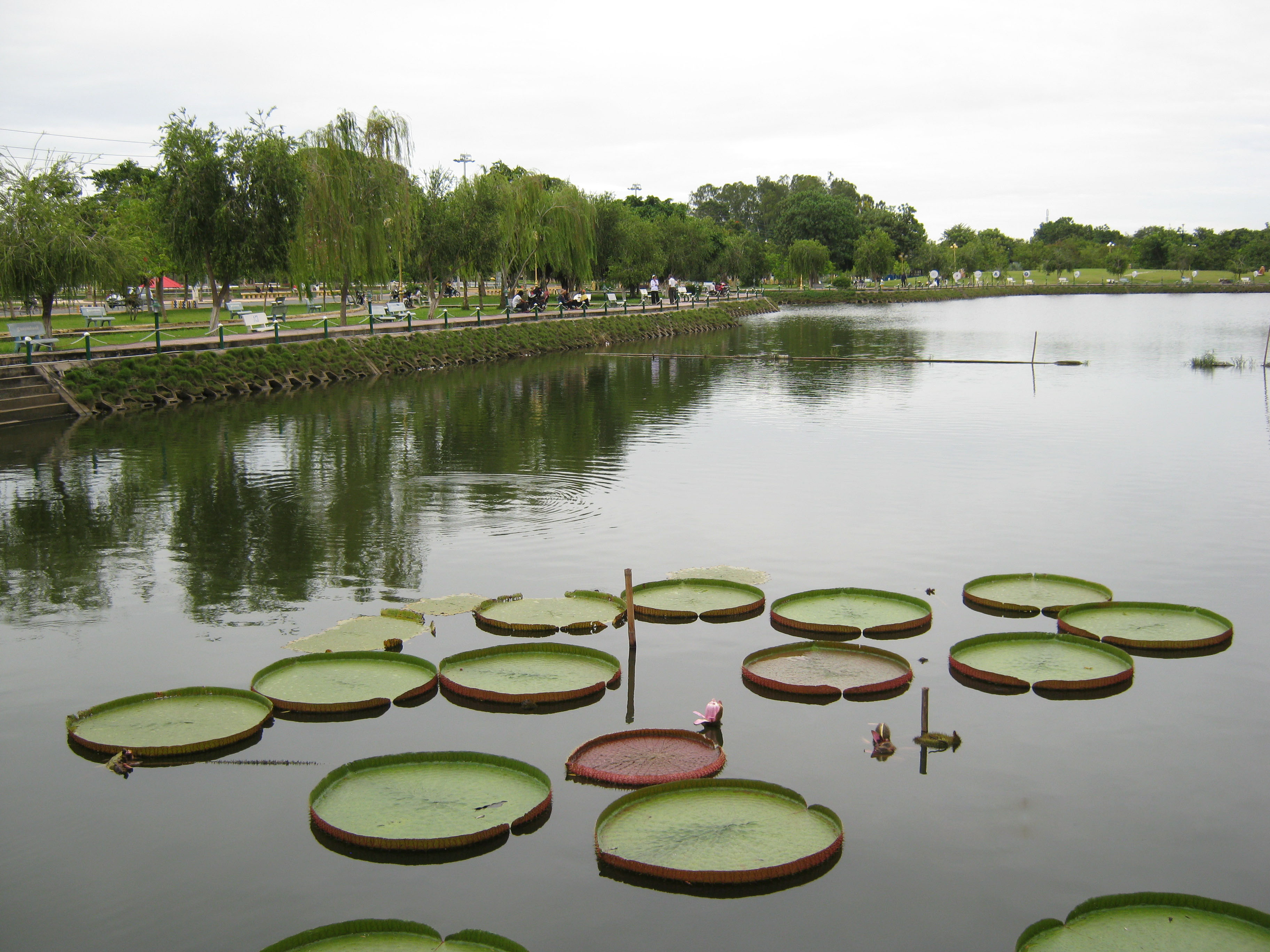
A park located outside of the Văn Thánh Miếu

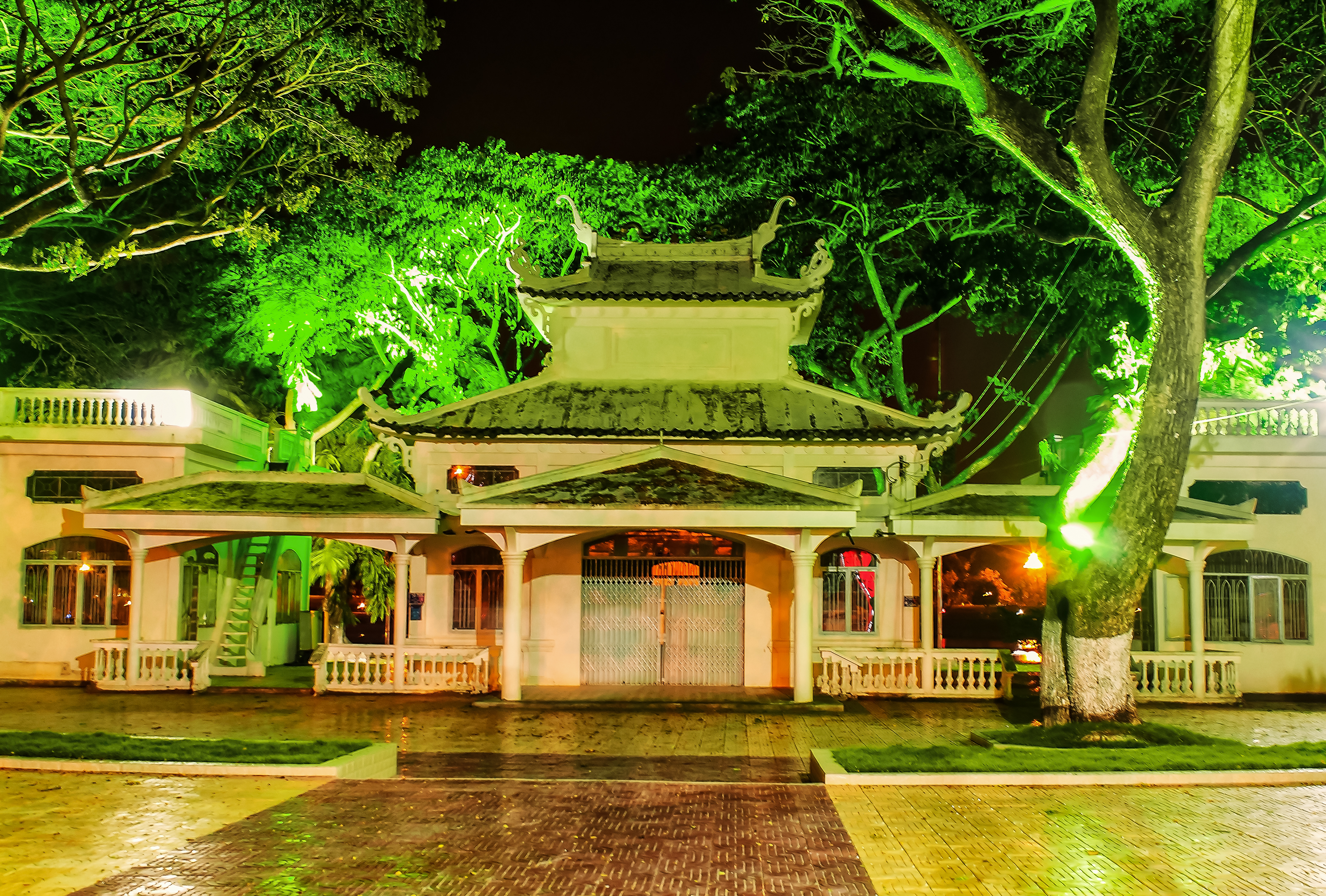
The temple lit up for the night
