= Vietnam Forest Rangers =

Vietnamese law enforcement agency

Department of Forestry and Forest Protection
- Cục Lâm nghiệp và Kiểm lâm
- Cap badge

- Flag of the service

- Patch
- Formation: 21 May 1973
- Type: Law enforcement agency
- Legal status: Active
- Headquarters: 2 Ngọc Hà street, Ba Đình ward,Hanoi
- Location: Hanoi Vietnam
- Official language: Vietnamese
- Director: Trần Quang Bảo
- Parent organization: Ministry of Agriculture and Environment

Department of Forestry and Forest Protection (Vietnamese: Cục Lâm nghiệp và Kiểm lâm), also known as the Vietnam Forest Rangers (Vietnamese: Kiểm lâm Việt Nam) is the main law enforcement agency in Vietnam to provide forest protection, enforce forestry laws, and to prevent and fight forest fires.

Vietnam Forest Rangers were reorganized into the Department of Forestry and Forest Rangers under Ministry of Agriculture and Environment in 2025.

== Missions and powers ==
=== Missions ===
According to Article 2 of Decision number 138/QĐ-BNNMT of the Ministry of Agriculture and Environment, Department of Forestry and Forest Protection have missions and powers listed here:

1. Present the Minister with documents relate to the Department's mission, including laws suggestions, plans,...
2. Assist, checking, implement and issuing propaganda about laws, plannings, projects related to forestry and forest protection; assist, checking professional skill about the Department's mission.
3. Forest protection and prevent and fight forest fire
4. Enforce forestry's laws
5. Managing protection forest
6. Managing wild animals, forest flora and forest ecosystem
7. Following missions as the agency enforce CITES in Vietnam:
  1. Developing forest
  2. Managing cultivar
  3. Organize scientific research and educational event; research about forest product output and recommendation for managing and sustainable exploitation
  4. Overseeing prosessing and selling of forest product
  5. Organise production of forest product
  6. Overseeing reduction of greenhouse gas and carbon emission in forestry
  7. Overseeing financial decision relate to the Department's missions and forest under the Department's control according to the Ministry's assign and laws.
8. Inspection in accordance to the laws. Citizen reception and resolve report, accusation and unlawful action relate to forestry according to the Minister's assign.
9. Scientific research, international cooperation and cooperated in the world economy of forestry.
10. Overseeing organisation under the control of the Department.
11. Administrative reform, practicing anti-corruption action according to the Ministry's plans.
12. Overseeing Department's personnels.
13. Perform other missions according to the Minister's assign.

=== Powers ===
1. Request organisation and individuals to provide information and documents according to the law;
2. Issues fine; prosecute and investigate forestry violation according to the law;
3. Using specialise vehicles and tools, weapons, assisting tools and uniforms according to the law.

== History ==
Vietnam Forest Rangers was established on 21 May 1973 under the control of the Ministry of Forestry based on preceding forest protection agency. The force was under the direction of the Department of People's Forest Protection.

In the 1980s, the Forest Rangers was divided between many unions and afforestation yards, meaning there was no central command.

In 1994, following Decree number 39/CP by the Vietnamese government, the department was renamed the Department of Forest Protection. The Forest Rangers was also reorganised into a more unison command with a network of smaller forest protection unit in protection forest all over the country.

From 2006, following decree number 119/2006/NĐ-CP, Forest Rangers unit had new mission including assign to commune and ending the service of some smaller units

Following Decree number 35 about the power and organisation of the Ministry of Agriculture and Environment, the Department of Forestry and the Department of Forest Protection merged into the Department of Forestry and Forest Protection .

== Organisation ==
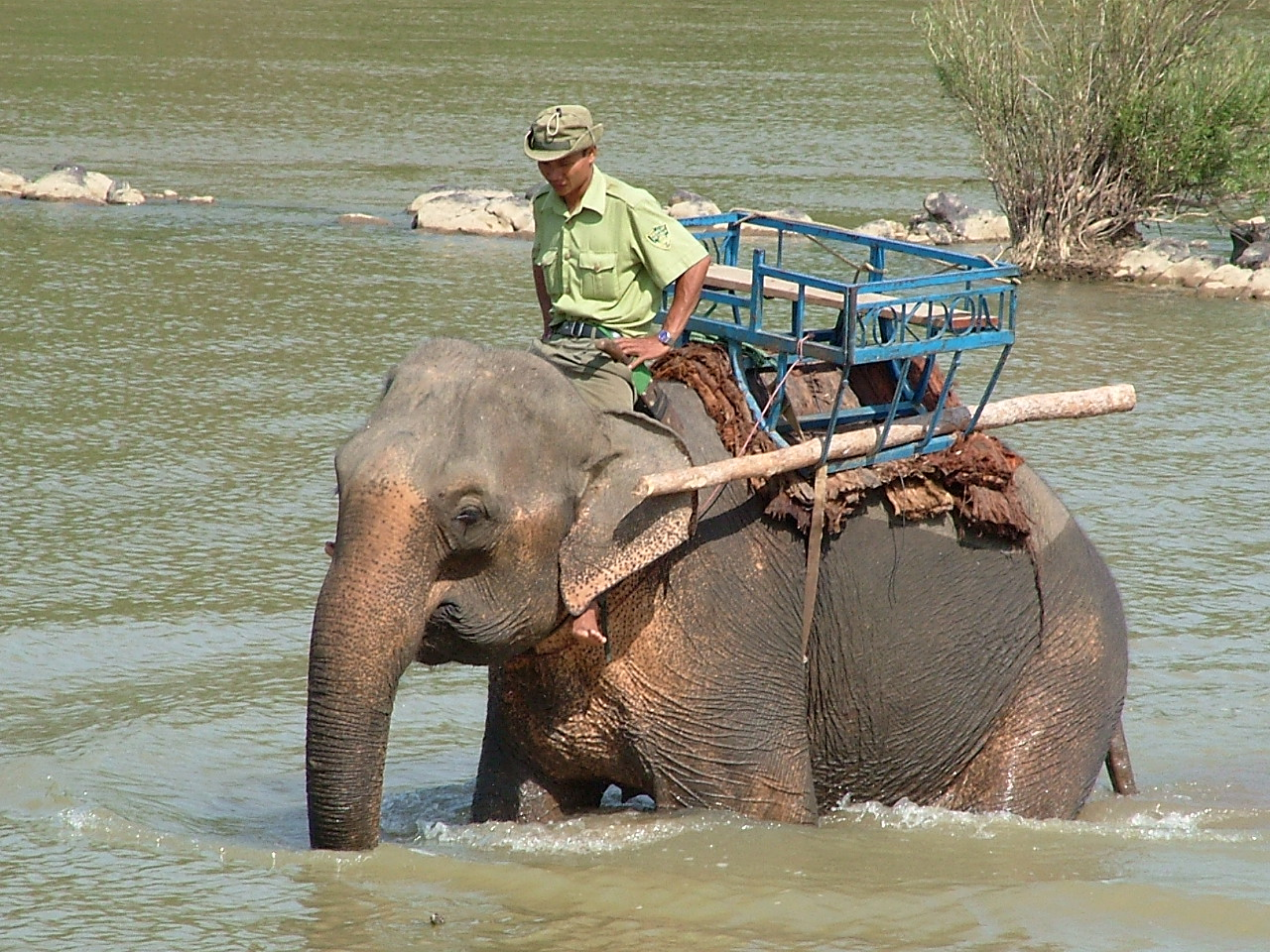
Forest Rangers in Yok Đôn National Park.

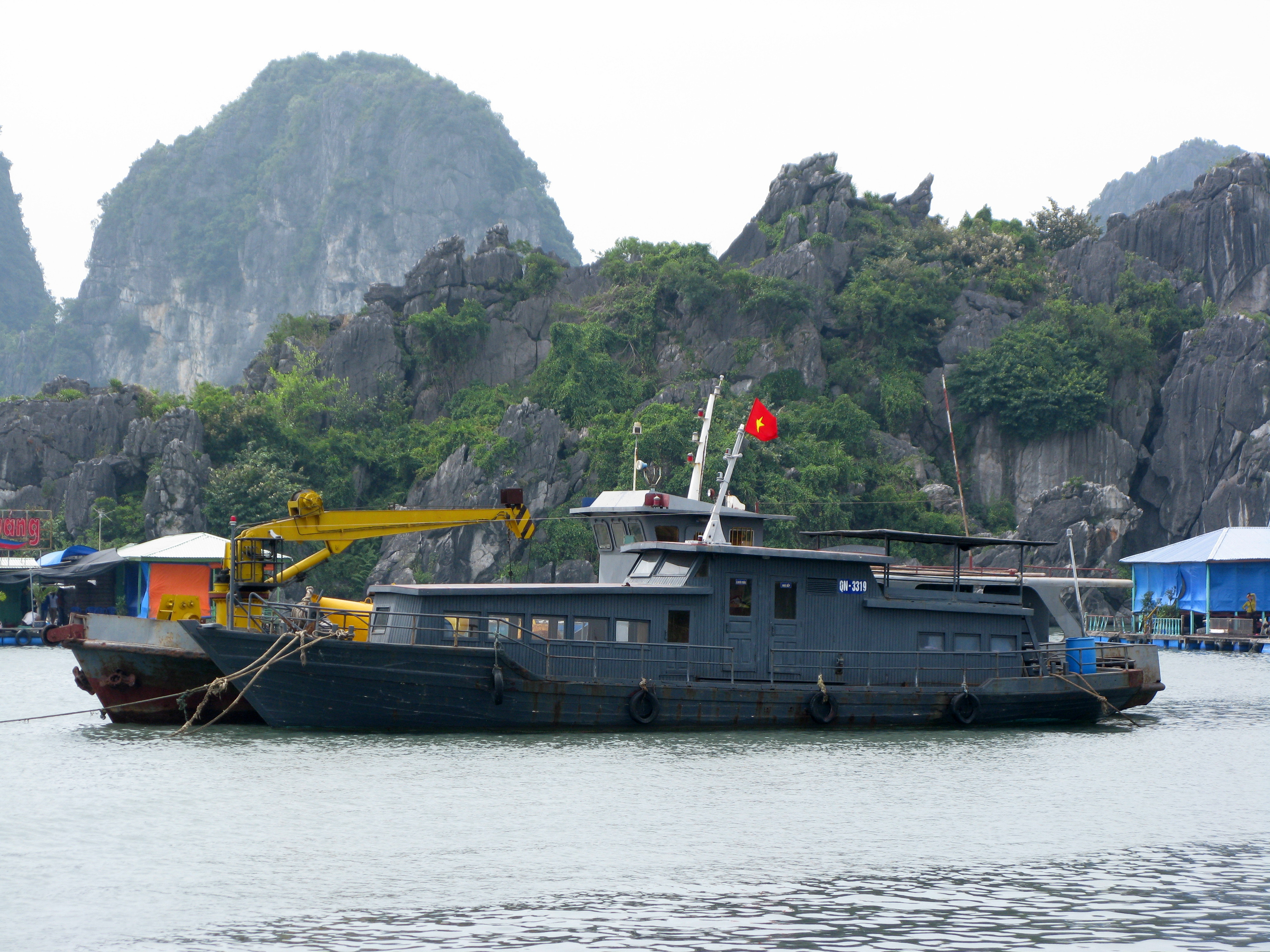
Forest Rangers patrol boat in Hạ Long Bay.

Forest Rangers ensign

=== Organisational chart ===
==== Department leaders ====
- Director: Trần Quang Bảo.
- Deputy Director:
1. Nguyễn Văn Diện.
2. Trần Hồng Hải.
3. Triệu Văn Lực.

==== Offices ====
- Department's Office.
- Financial and Plans Department.
- Science, Technology and International Cooperation Department.
- Legal and Inspection Department.
- Information and Digital Transformation Department.
- Forest Protection Control Department.
- Wildfire Prevention and Firefighting Department.
- Personnel Department.
- Investigation Department.
- Special Forest Rangers Team.

==== Regional branches ====
- Forest Protection Department No. I, headquarter in Quảng Ninh.
- Forest Protection Department No. II, headquarter in Thanh Hóa.
- Forest Protection Department No. III, headquarter in Thành phố Hồ Chí Minh.
- Forest Protection Department No. IV, headquarter in Đắk Lắk.

==== Parks ====
- Tam Đảo National Park.
- Ba Vì National Park.
- Cúc Phương National Park.
- Bạch Mã National Park .
- Cát Tiên National Park.
- Yok Đôn National Park.
