= Flag of Vietnam =

Socialist Republic of Vietnam
- Quốc kỳ ('National flag' or 'State flag'); Cờ đỏ sao vàng ('Red banner with golden star'); Cờ Tổ quốc ('Flag of the Fatherland')
- Use: Civil and state flag
- Proportion: 2:3
- Adopted: 23 November 1940; 85 years ago (Cochinchina uprising); 2 September 1945; 81 years ago (Democratic Republic of Vietnam); 30 November 1955; 70 years ago (current version); 2 July 1976; 50 years ago (reunified Socialist Republic of Vietnam)
- Design: A large gold five-pointed star centered on a red field.
- Designed by: Nguyễn Hữu Tiến (disputed)
- Flag of the People's Army of Vietnam
- Quân kỳ Quyết thắng ('Determined to Win Military flag')
- Use: War flag
- Proportion: 2:3
- Design: A golden star centered on a red field, and yellow words Quyết thắng (Determined to win) in the upper canton.
- Designed by: Design is a variant of the flag of Vietnam
- Flag of the Vietnam People's Public Security
- Công an kỳ
- Use: Police flag
- Proportion: 2:3
- Design: A golden star centered on a red field, and yellow motto Bảo vệ an ninh Tổ quốc (Protecting the security of the Fatherland) in the upper canton.
- Designed by: Design is a variant of the flag of Vietnam
- Ensign of the Vietnam People's Navy
- Cờ Hải quân
- Use: Naval ensign
- Proportion: 2:3
- Adopted: 15 January 2014
- Design: A white flag with an emblem referring the Vietnam People's Navy in the top with the red label Hải quân Việt Nam ('Navy of Vietnam') and a blue strip below.
- Designed by: Vietnam People's Navy, with the influence from the naval ensign of the Soviet Navy

The national flag of the Socialist Republic of Vietnam (Vietnamese: Quốc kỳ nước Cộng hoà xã hội chủ nghĩa Việt Nam), (Note: Also known as the Red flag with the golden star (cờ đỏ sao vàng) (Note: In Vietnamese, 'golden' and 'yellow' are both vàng.) or the Flag of the Fatherland (cờ Tổ quốc), or simply the National flag (Quốc kỳ)) previously presenting the Democratic Republic of Vietnam, was originally designed in 1940 and first used during a failed worker and peasant uprising against the French colonialists in Cochinchina that year. The red background symbolizes revolution and bloodshed. The golden star symbolizes the soul of the nation and the five points of the star represents the five main classes in Vietnamese society—intellectuals, farmers, workers, entrepreneurs, and soldiers.

The earliest version of the flag was used by the Viet Minh, a communist-led organization created in 1941 to oppose Japanese military occupation and French colonialism. At the end of World War II, Viet Minh leader Ho Chi Minh proclaimed Vietnam independent and signed a decree on 5 September 1945 adopting the Viet Minh flag as the flag of the Democratic Republic of Vietnam. The DRV became the government of North Vietnam in 1954 following the Geneva Accords. The flag was modified on 30 November 1955 to make the points of the star straighter, which became the standard design for the current Vietnamese flag. Until the end of the Vietnam War in 1975, the State of Vietnam and later the Republic of Vietnam (South) used a yellow flag with three red stripes. The red flag of North Vietnam was later adopted as the flag of the unified Vietnam in 1976. The flag of Vietnam is the only flag amongst ASEAN that does not contain the colour white, with red and yellow/gold being its historical national colours.

== Design and history ==
Flag of the Democratic Republic of Vietnam in 1945–1955. It is nicknamed the Morning Star flag (Cờ sao mai, referring Venus) or jokingly the Fat Star flag (Cờ sao béo) by contemporary popular culture.

Vietnamese flag colours have often been various designs of red and bright yellow or gold. According to Article 141 of the 1992 constitution: "The National Flag of the Socialist Republic of Vietnam is rectangular in shape, its width is equal to two thirds of its length, in the middle of fresh red background is a bright five-pointed golden star". The flag is blazoned: Gules, a mullet of five points or.

The flag first appeared in the Cochinchina uprising (Nam Kỳ Khởi nghĩa) of 23 November 1940, against French rule in southern Vietnam. A series of articles by Sơn Tùng on the origin of the flag were published in the state media in 1981. Sơn Tùng stated that the flag was designed by Nguyễn Hữu Tiến, a leader of the uprising who was arrested by the French in advance of the failed uprising and executed 28 August 1941.

Tiến, who was born in the northern village of Lũng Xuyên, was unknown to the Vietnamese public before Tùng's research was published. According to a poem Tiến wrote, the red background came to represent the blood of the people, whilst the yellow foreground came to represent "the colour of our people’s skin" which was written during times of oppression from Japanese rule. The five points of the star represents intellectuals, peasants, workers, traders and soldiers.

Yellow (or gold) and red has long been common amongst Vietnamese flags. Yellow/Gold was a traditional color of Vietnam for more than 2,000 years, despite various historical interpretation. In April 2001, Vietnam's Ministry of Culture reported that there was no documentation to support the claim that Tiến designed the flag. In 2005, Lê Minh Đức, an official of Tiền Giang province, suggested that the flag was designed by another cadre, Lê Quang Sô, a native of Mỹ Tho Province in the Mekong Delta.

Đức's theory is based on statements by Sô's son as well as Sô's 1968 memoir. According to Đức, yellow was chosen to represent Vietnam while the red background was inspired by the flag of the Communist Party and represents revolution. Sô experimented with stars in various positions and sizes before choosing a large star in the center for aesthetic reasons. In April 1955, the flag was approved by Phan Văn Khỏe, the Communist party chief of Mỹ Tho. It was subsequently approved by the national party in July. As of 2006, the state media has not commented on Đức's version of events.

The flag was displayed at a conference on 19 May 1941, at which the Viet Minh was founded. The Viet Minh proclaimed it a "national flag" on 17 August 1945, at a meeting held in the village of Tân Trào in the North. When the Japanese surrendered to the Allies at the end of World War II, the Viet Minh entered Hanoi and proclaimed the "Democratic Republic of Vietnam" on 2 September. On 5 September, DRV President Ho Chi Minh signed a decree adopting the Viet Minh flag. French troops returned in October and restored colonial rule in the South. The National Assembly voted unanimously to adopt the flag on 2 March 1946. Ho Chi Minh further explained in a July 1947 interview that Vietnam chose the star for its flag because of its long-standing ties with China, whose flag featured a sun.

Following the Geneva Accord between the Viet Minh and France in 1954, the DRV became the government of North Vietnam. On 30 November 1955, the flag's design was modified slightly to make the star smaller and its rays straighter. This followed a similar modification of the flag of the Soviet Union. The flag was adopted in the South after the end of the Vietnam War, and North and South were unified as the Socialist Republic of Vietnam on 2 July 1976. The flag of the Democratic Republic of Vietnam (the Viet Minh-controlled areas in Northern and Southern Vietnam and later just North Vietnam) from 1945 to 1955 was similar to the current flag of Vietnam but with the points of the star set at a more obtuse angle.

Despite its historical connotations, nowadays, the red background (or red field) on the Vietnamese flag is commonly a symbol of bloodshed, struggle, and the success of revolution, inspired by communist symbolism. The yellow star centred on the red field symbolizes one of five classes of society—entrepreneurs, farmers, workers, intellectuals and soldiers representing each point of the star, while the yellow (or gold, depends on the literary tone) color of the star represents the Vietnamese ethnicity (from the self-perception that Asian people have yellow skin). The flag may also be flown with the flag of the Communist Party of Vietnam.

== Colour scheme and design ==
Construction sheet of the flag. Even though the construction of the flag is formally and constitutionally standardized, copies that don't obey the above guidelines are still widely used. Those include the popular usage of different flag proportions, as well as the inaccurately-sized and centered star.

An example and uncodified representation of the Vietnamese national flag in the 1:2 ratio. The star is usually bigger or smaller than the original specifications, while its centering also varies.

This is a color approximation of the Vietnamese flag. Vietnam does not have an actual "flag code", having only the Constitution and the Vietnam Standards briefly nominating the aspect ratios and layout of the flag with no standardized color schemes. Meanwhile, flags with different color shades and ratios - sometimes violating the Constitution and Vietnam Standards' framework - are still physically and digitally displayed by both civilians and state entities as long as they obey the "red background with a centered yellow star" symbolism. The dimensions of the banner can also be intentionally adapted by the Government of Vietnam for several occasions where the Vietnamese flag is flown with other countries' flags having nonnegotiable aspect ratios, for example the Flag of the United States.

Vietnam	Red	Yellow
Pantone	1788	Yellow
RGB	218/37/29	255/255/0
Hexadecimal	#DA251D	#FFFF00
CMYK	0/83/87/15	0/0/100/0

== Historical flags ==
The Long tinh (lit. 'Dragon Star') banner was arguably the first Vietnamese national flag, being adopted during the final years of the Nguyễn dynasty to represent the country as a whole.

Traditional images show the Trung sisters wearing yellow turbans during their revolt against North (China) in AD 40. These were unwrapped and waved to signal the beginning of a fight. However, they were not really national flags, but were more royal standards representing the monarchs and dynasties; the definition of national flags which represent the state and nation was only introduced in the later period during Nguyễn dynasty. The French, who gradually gained control of Vietnam in the late 19th century, flew the national flag of France. The colony of Cochinchina (1862–1945) was under exclusive French authority. In contrast, Annam and Tonkin were protectorates with parallel systems of Vietnamese and French administration. Several flags were flown in these regions: the French flag, the protectorate flag (a yellow field with the French tricolor in the canton), and the Long tinh flag.

Japan occupied Vietnam in 1941–1945. In March 1945, the Japanese deposed the French colonial authorities and proclaimed an Empire of Vietnam with Bảo Đại as emperor. The Quẻ Ly flag, a red quẻ Ly (one of eight trigrams used in the I Ching) on a yellow background, was adopted in June. Among other things, quẻ Ly ☲ symbolizes the direction south. Bảo Đại abdicated in August when Japan surrendered. The Democratic Republic of Vietnam, proclaimed on 2 September 1945, adopted the red flag with a golden star. The French returned in 23rd of the same month, but were challenged by the Vietminh, especially in the North. The French proclaimed Cochinchina an autonomous republic in June 1946. This puppet state adopted a flag with three blue stripes on a yellow background.

In 1947, the name of the Cochinchina government was changed to "Provisional Government of Southern Vietnam" in preparation for a merger with the Provisional Central Government of Vietnam outlined in the Hạ Long Bay agreements between France and Bảo Đại. The flag of the State of Vietnam was adopted by Emperor Bảo Đại in 1949. The three stripes represented the Quẻ Càn, or Qian trigram. Quẻ Càn is the divination sign for heaven. On 2 June 1948, Prime Minister of the Provisional Central Government Nguyễn Văn Xuân first signed an ordinance to adopt this flag: "The national emblem is a flag of yellow background, the height of which is equal to two-thirds of its width. In the middle of the flag and along its entire width, there are three horizontal red bands. Each band has a height equal to one-fifteenth of the width. These three red bands are separated from one another by a space of the band's height." The flag of the State of Vietnam was later also used by its successor the Republic of Vietnam, commonly known as South Vietnam.

Flag of the National Liberation Front of South Vietnam and later the Republic of South Vietnam is a significant derivative of the Vietnamese flag.

On 20 December 1960, the National Liberation Front of South Vietnam adopted a tricolor flag modelled from that of North Vietnam, which is the red half at the top, the blue half at the bottom, and a yellow star in the center. On 8 June 1969, the Provisional Revolutionary Government of the Republic of South Vietnam (PRG) was proclaimed with the exact flag. This replaced the yellow flag after the fall of the Republic of Vietnam, and was used until the official reunification under a socialist government on 2 July 1976.

On the other hand, in January 2017, San Jose, which has the largest population of Vietnamese emigrants from what was formerly South Vietnam in the United States, banned the Vietnamese flag from being displayed on city flagpoles. This was motivated by a 2016 policy adopted by Westminster, California that forbid the display of the flag on city property. Nearby Milpitas also banned the flag from municipal display on 5 September 2017.

== Gallery ==
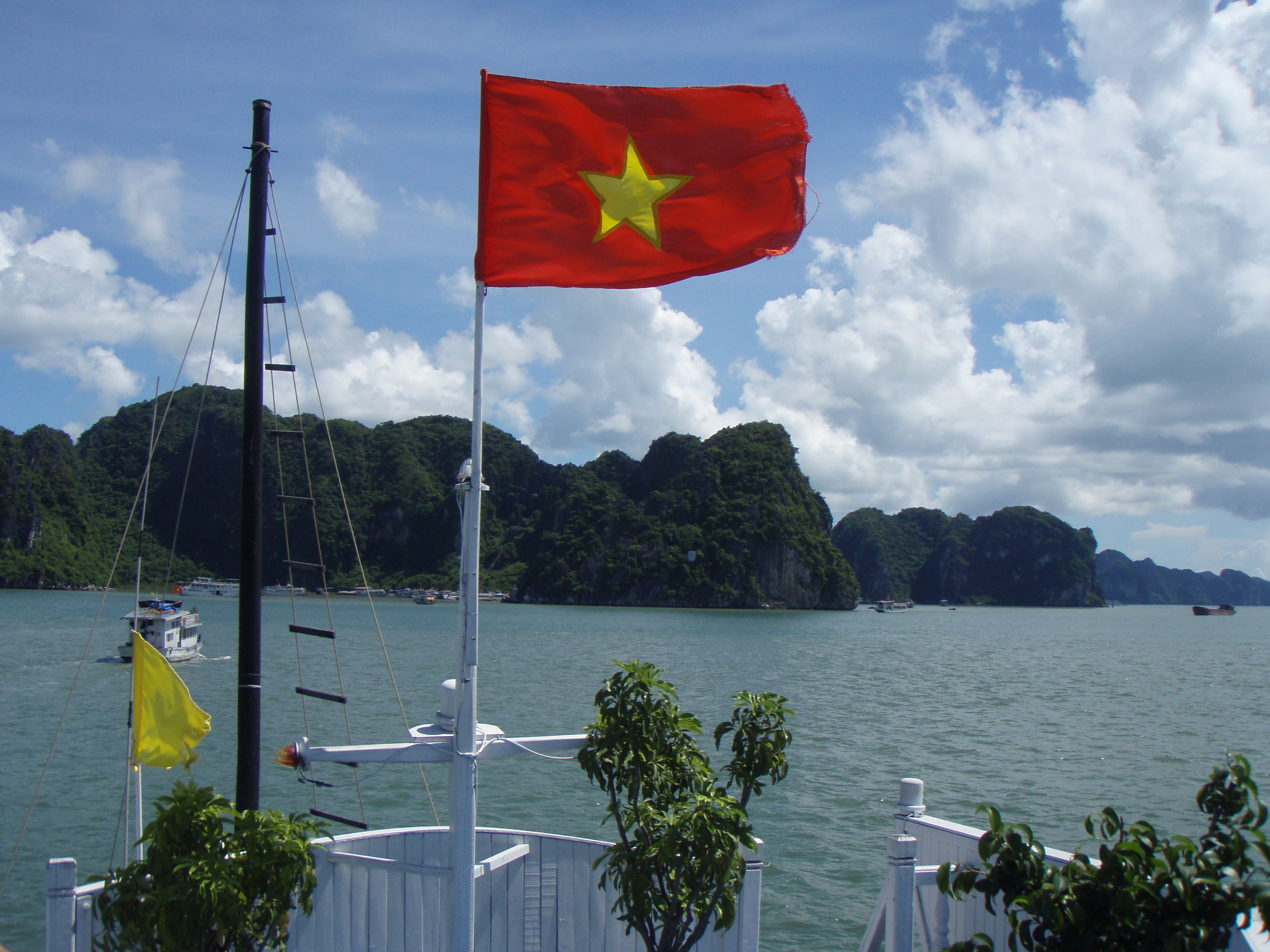
Vietnamese flag flown in Hạ Long Bay

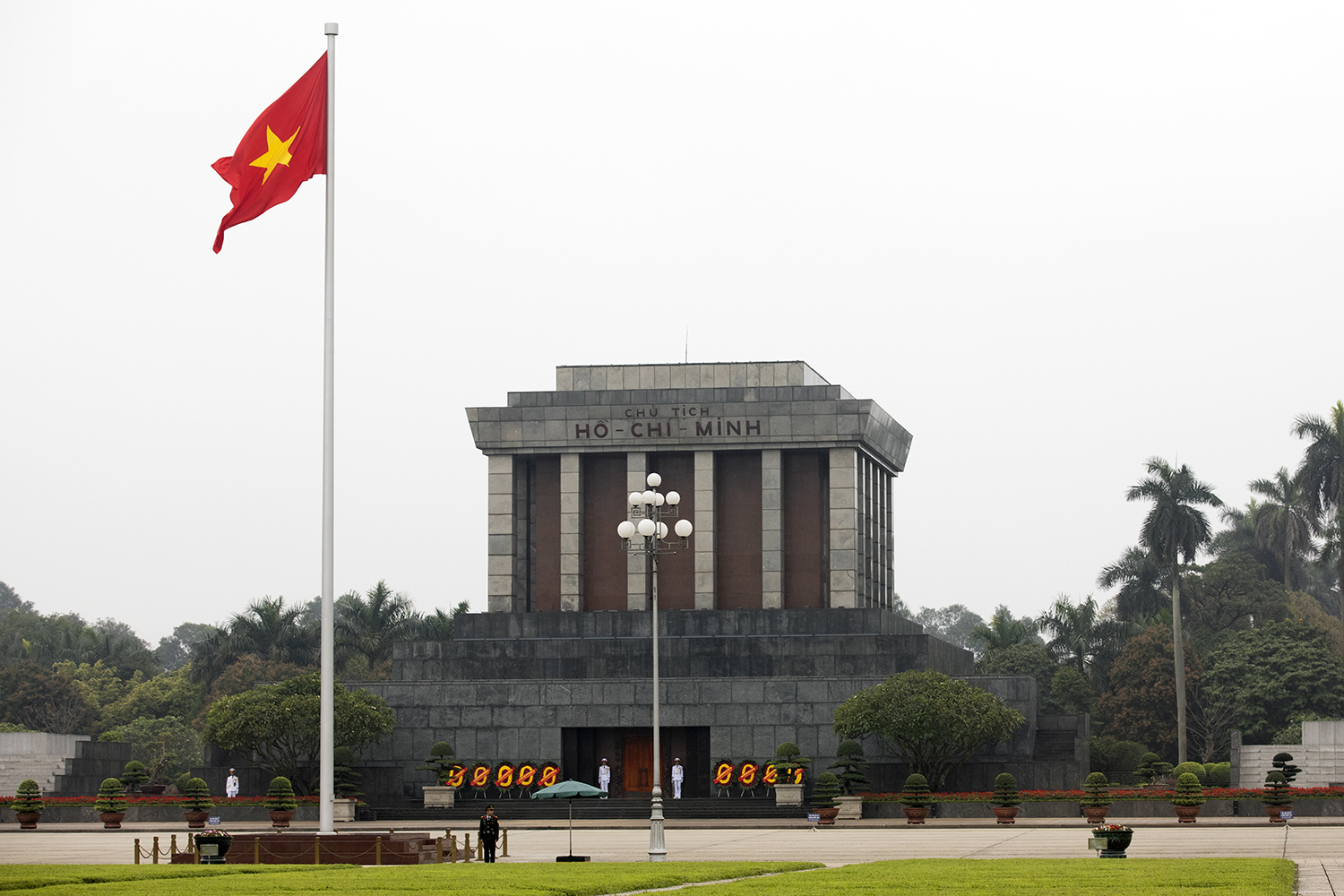
Flag of Vietnam in front of the Ho Chi Minh Mausoleum

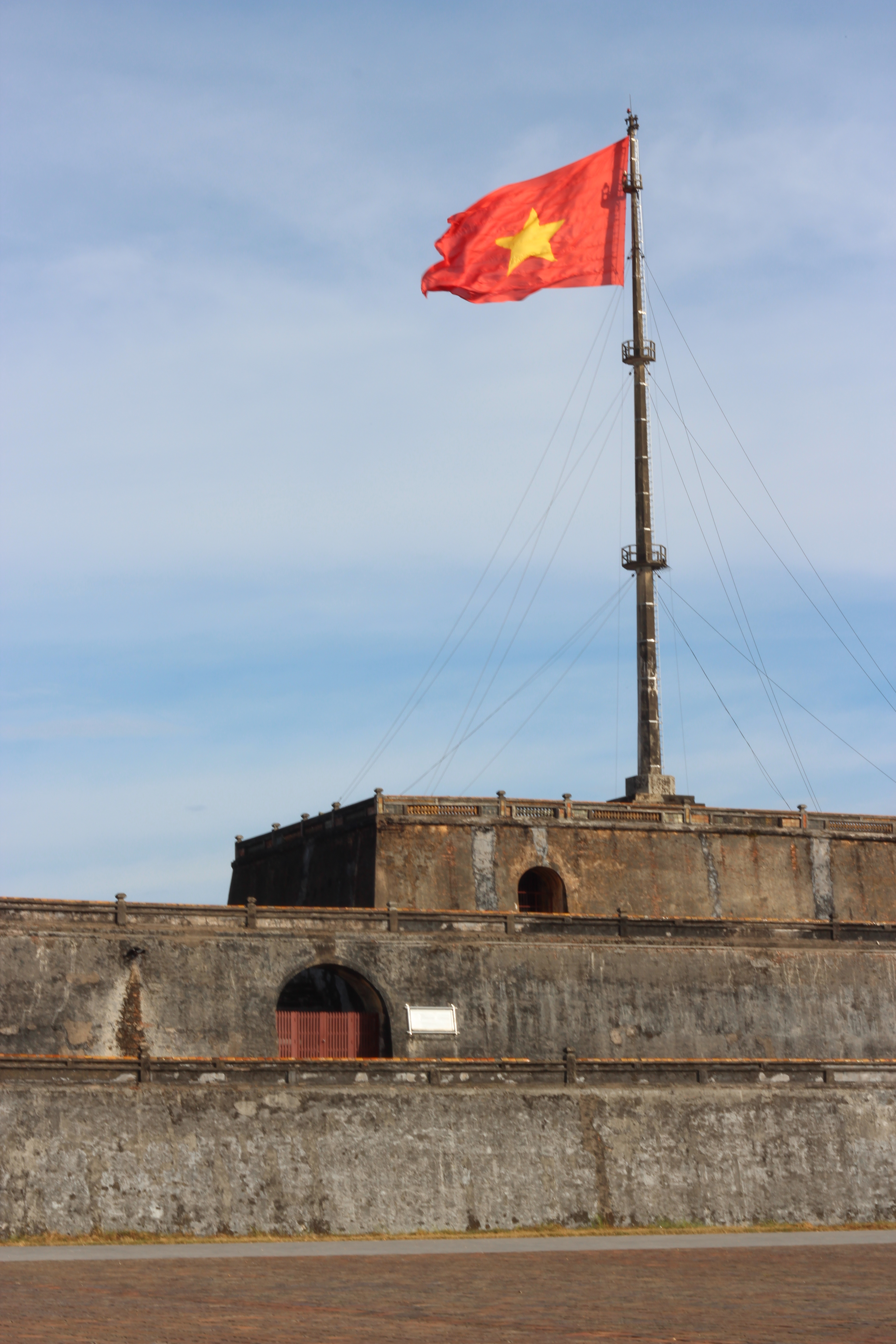
Flag of Vietnam in the Imperial City of Huế

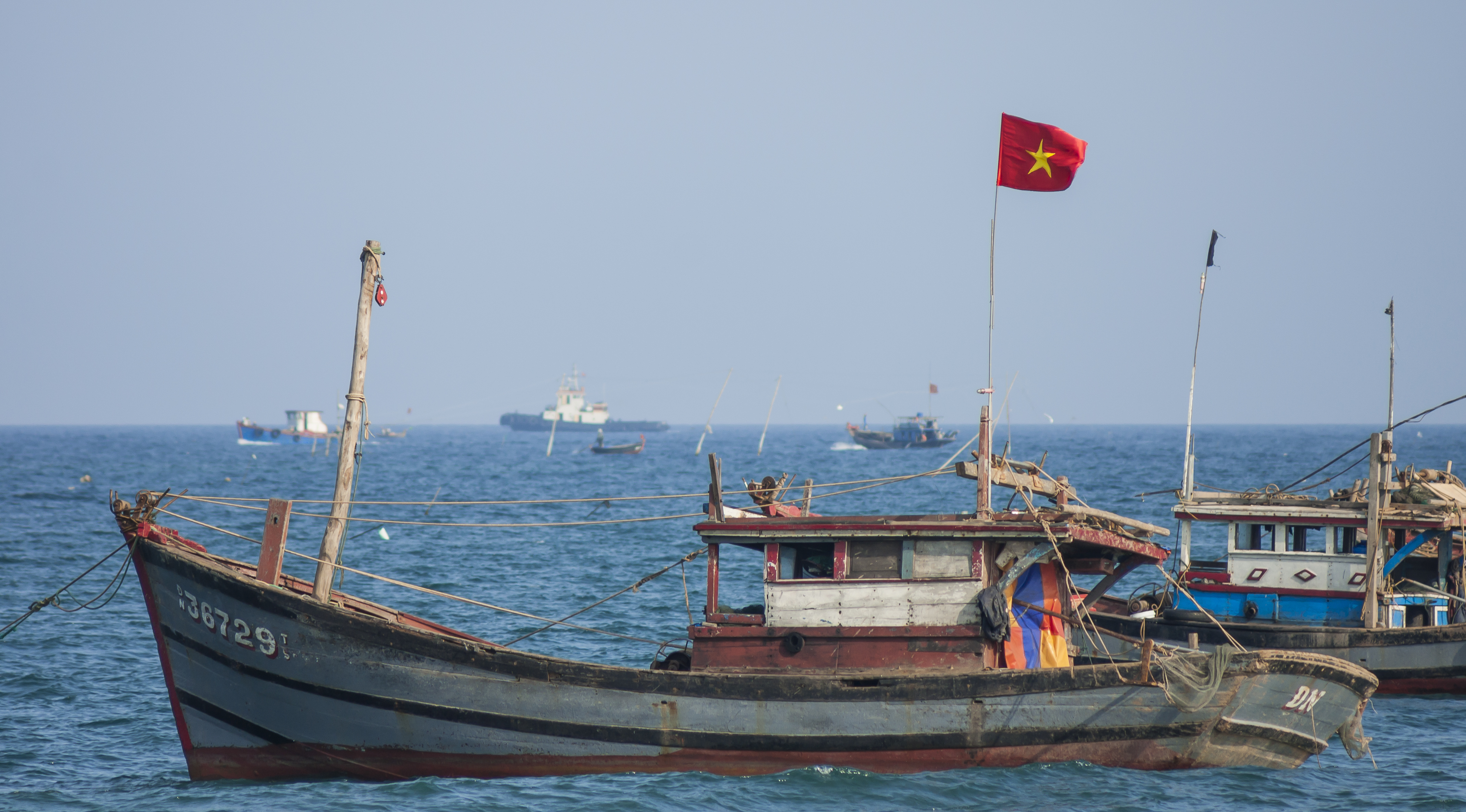
A civilian fishing boat flying the Vietnamese flag

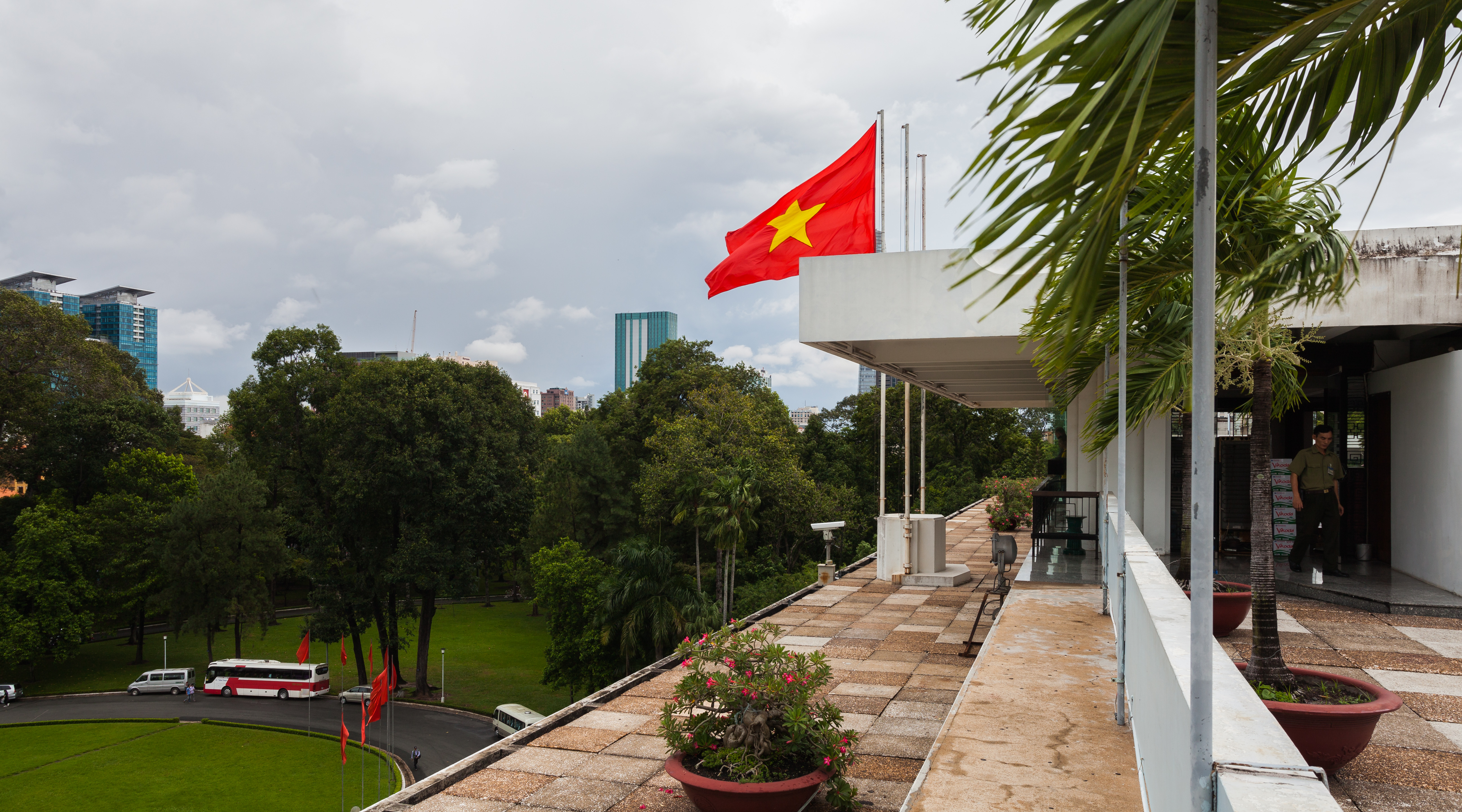
Flag of Vietnam hoisted in the Independence Palace

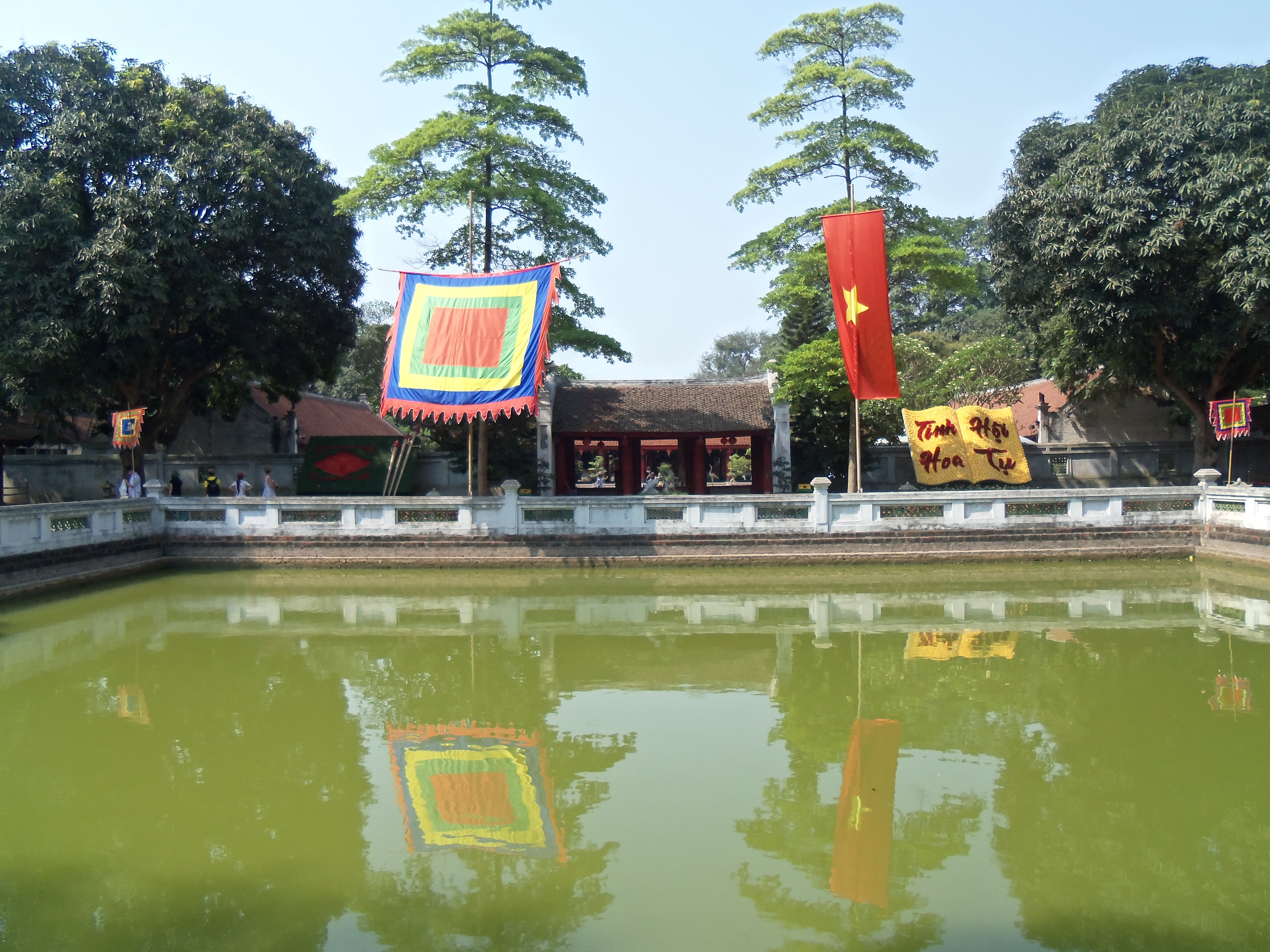
The state flag of Vietnam flown beside the traditional five-color flags

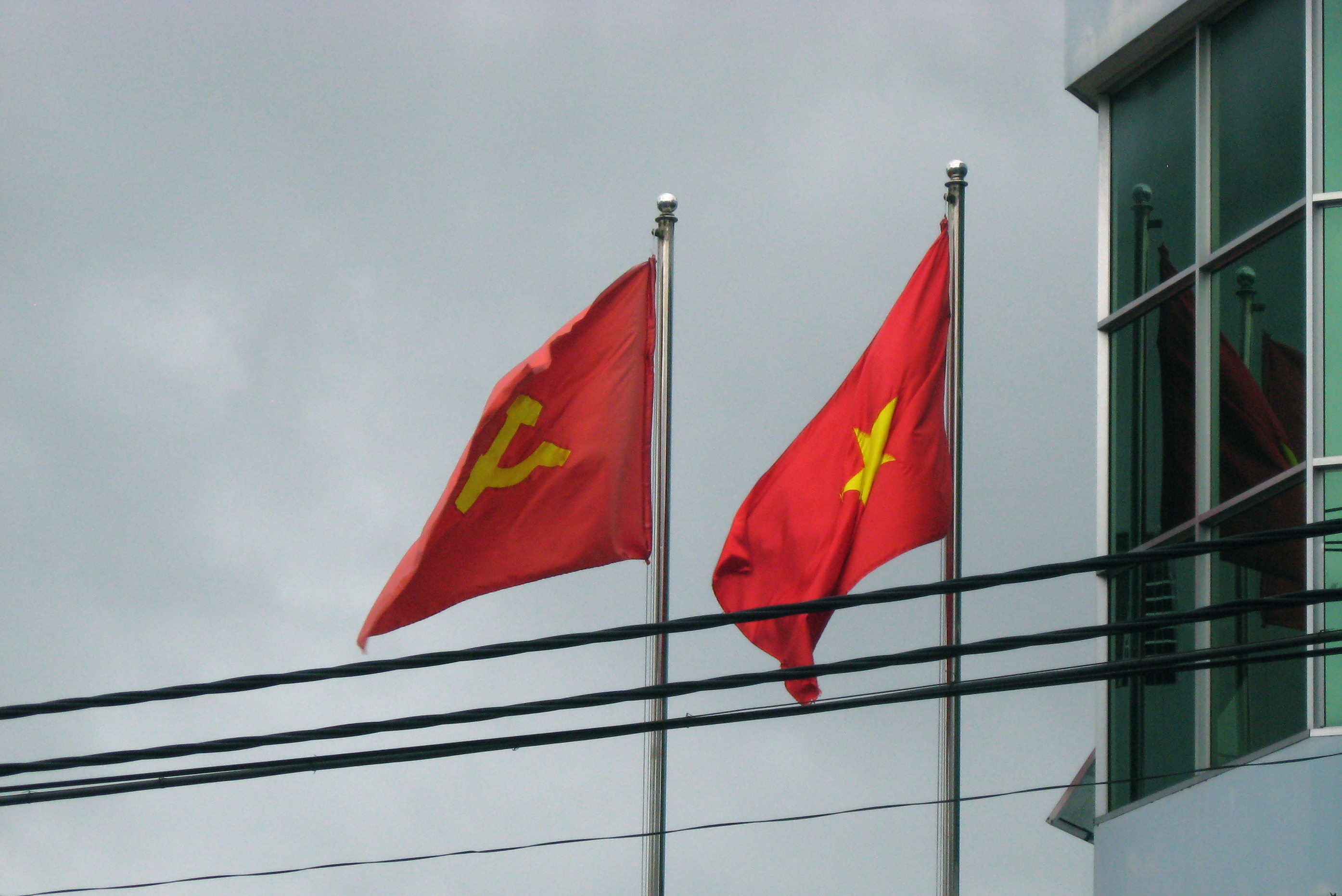
The national flag beside the flag of the Communist Party of Vietnam

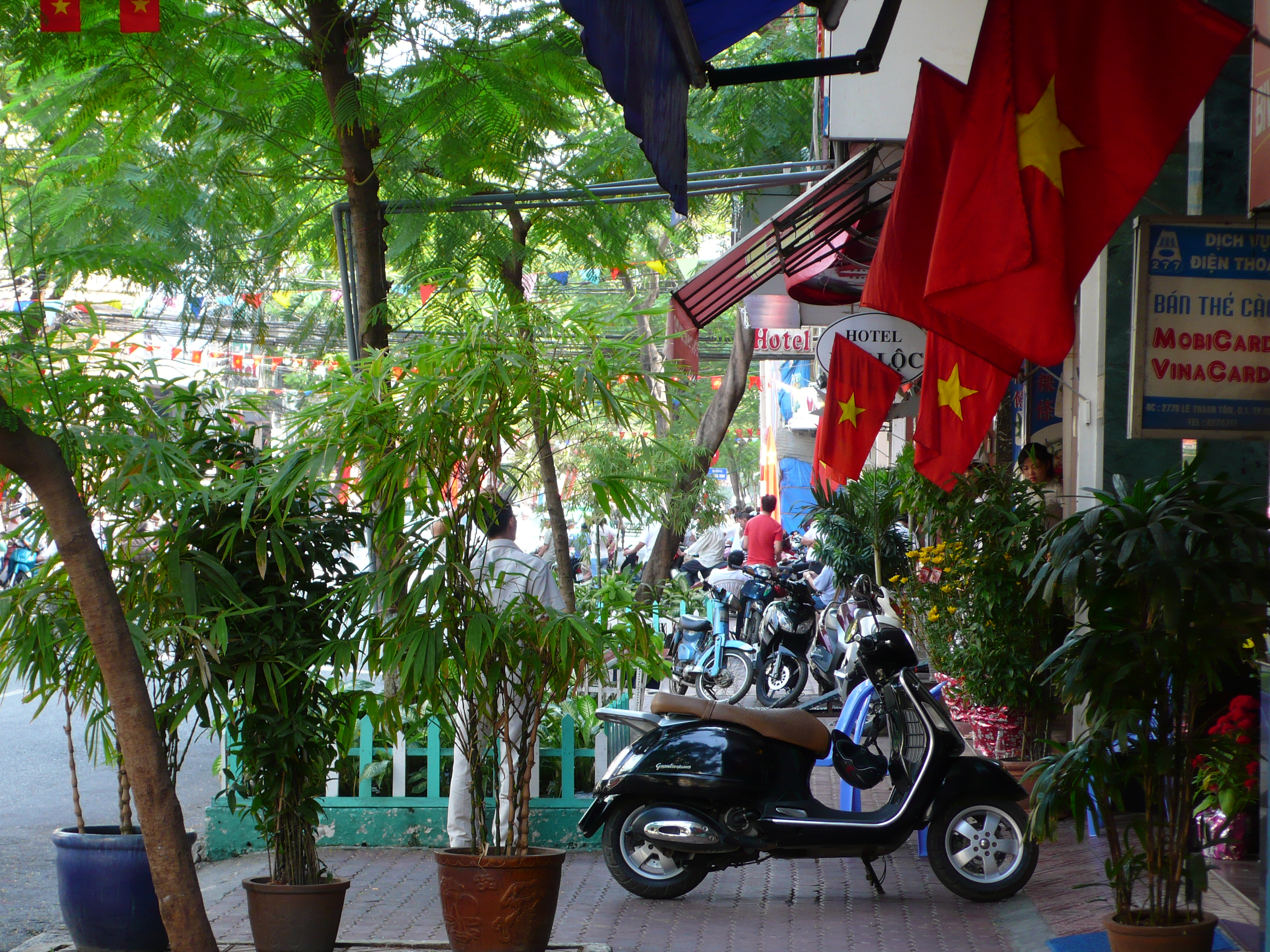
Flags displayed by Vietnamese houses during special occasions

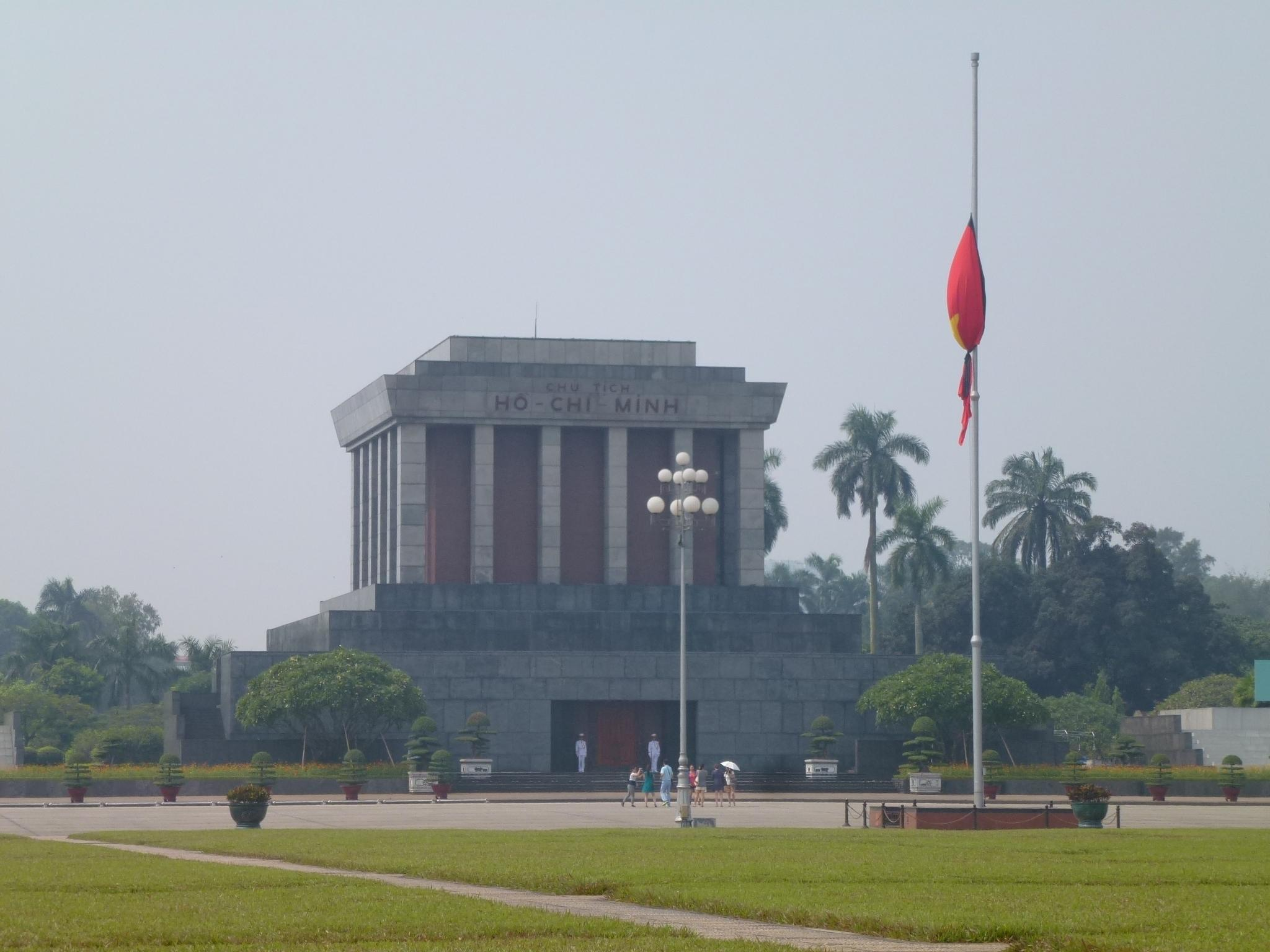
Flag flown half-staff at the Ho Chi Minh Mausoleum during the state funeral of Gen. Võ Nguyên Giáp

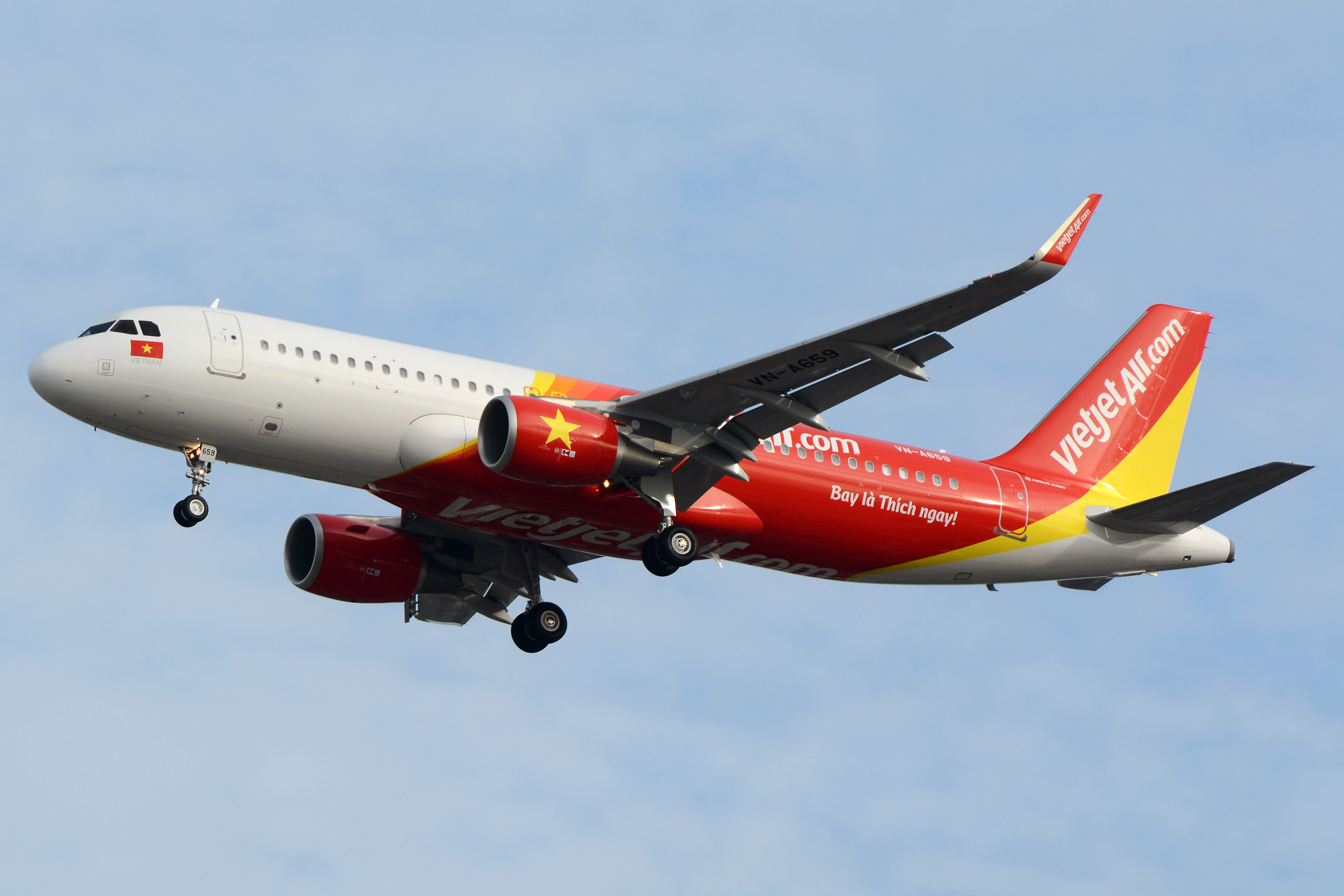
An aircraft of VietJet Air with the national flag painted below the windshield. The yellow-star-on-the-red-background symbolism of the Vietnamese flag is also used to decorate the engine.

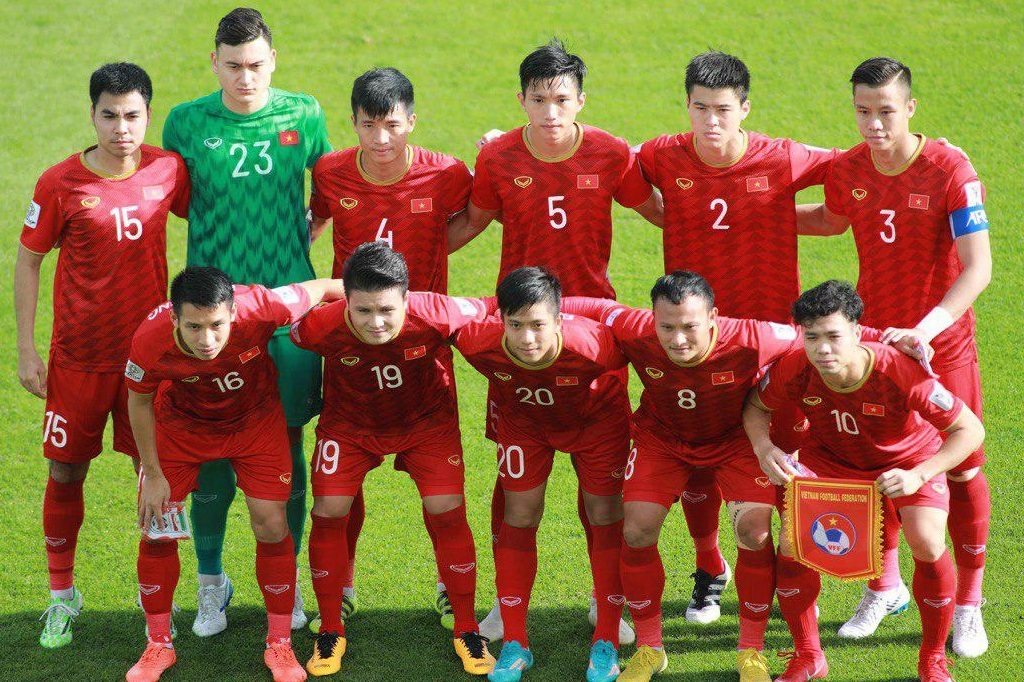
Jersey of the Vietnam national football team featuring the national flag

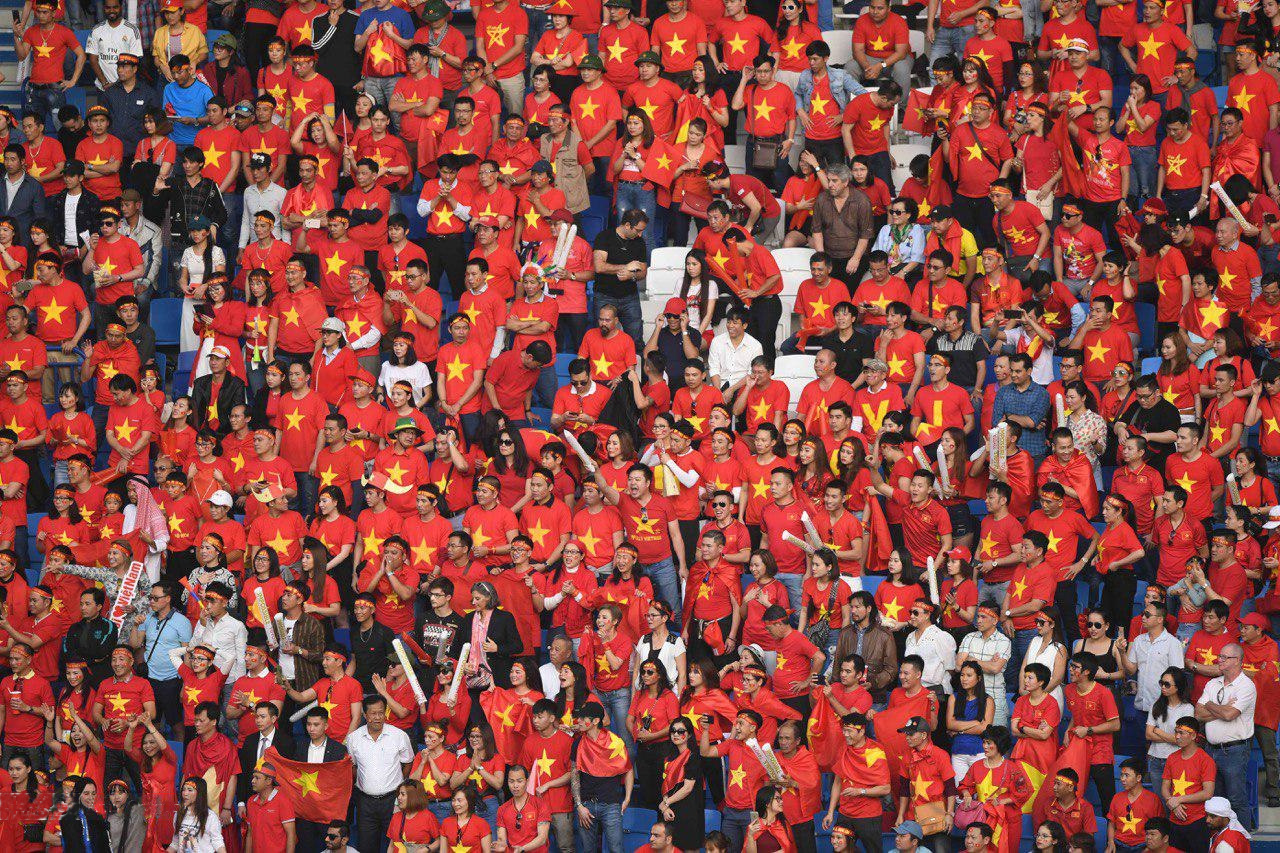
Supporters of the Vietnam national football team wearing attire that is visually inspired by the National Flag in the 2019 AFC Asian Cup

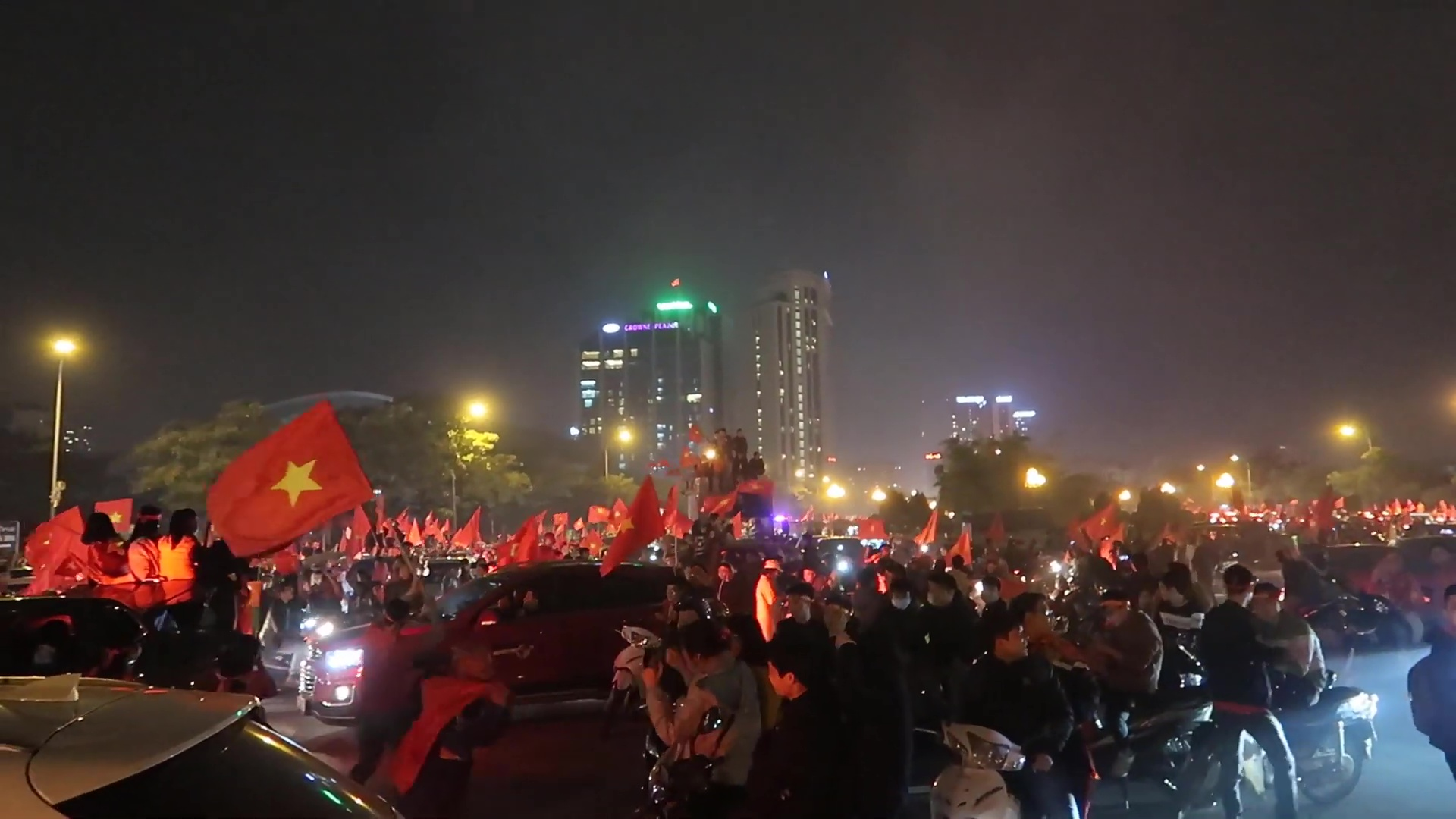
Jungle of flags used by Vietnamese citizens during the celebration of Vietnam's victory in the 2018 AFF Championship

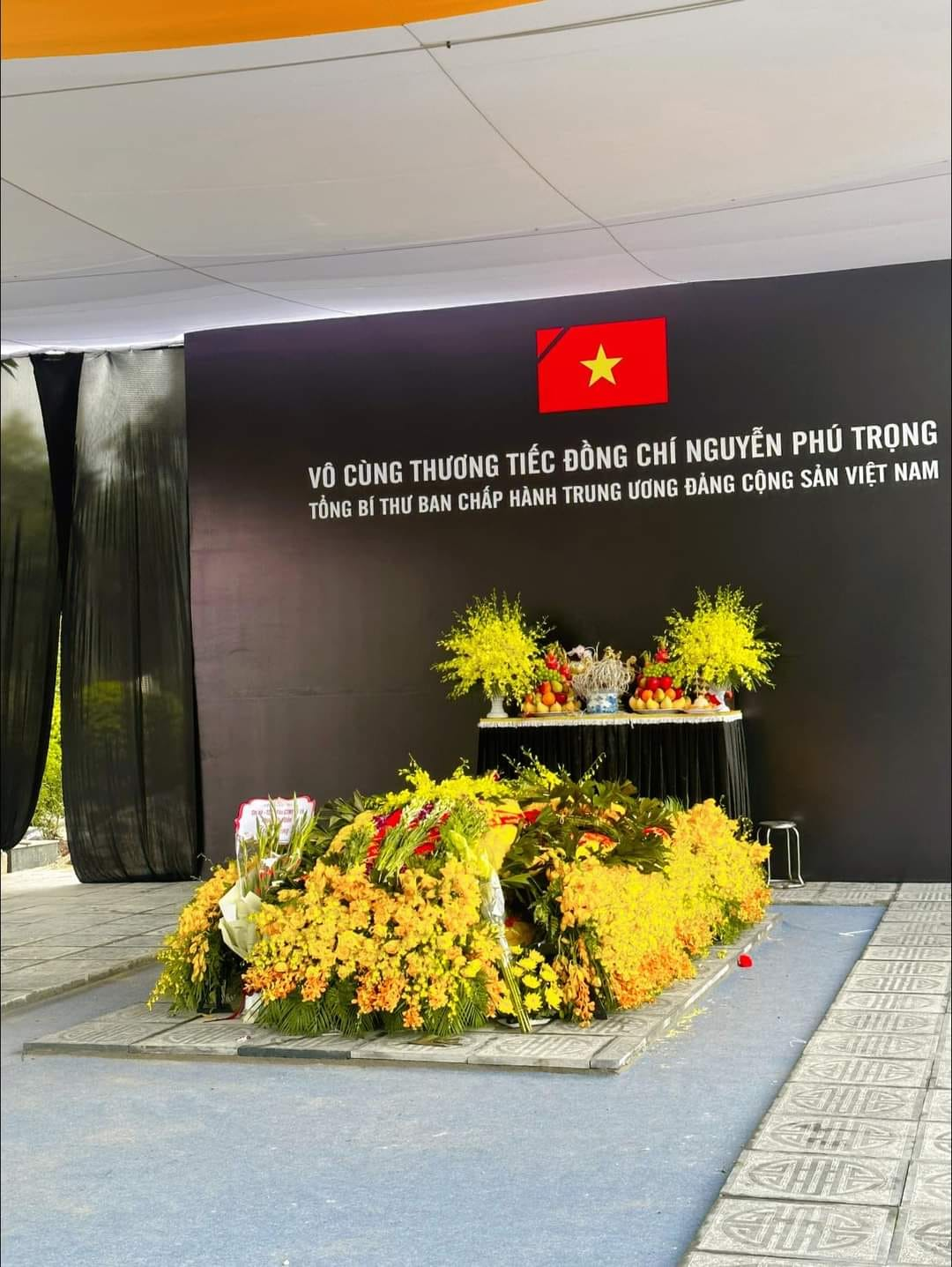
The funeral of Nguyễn Phú Trọng, displaying the Vietnamese flag with a black ribbon on the top right corner.

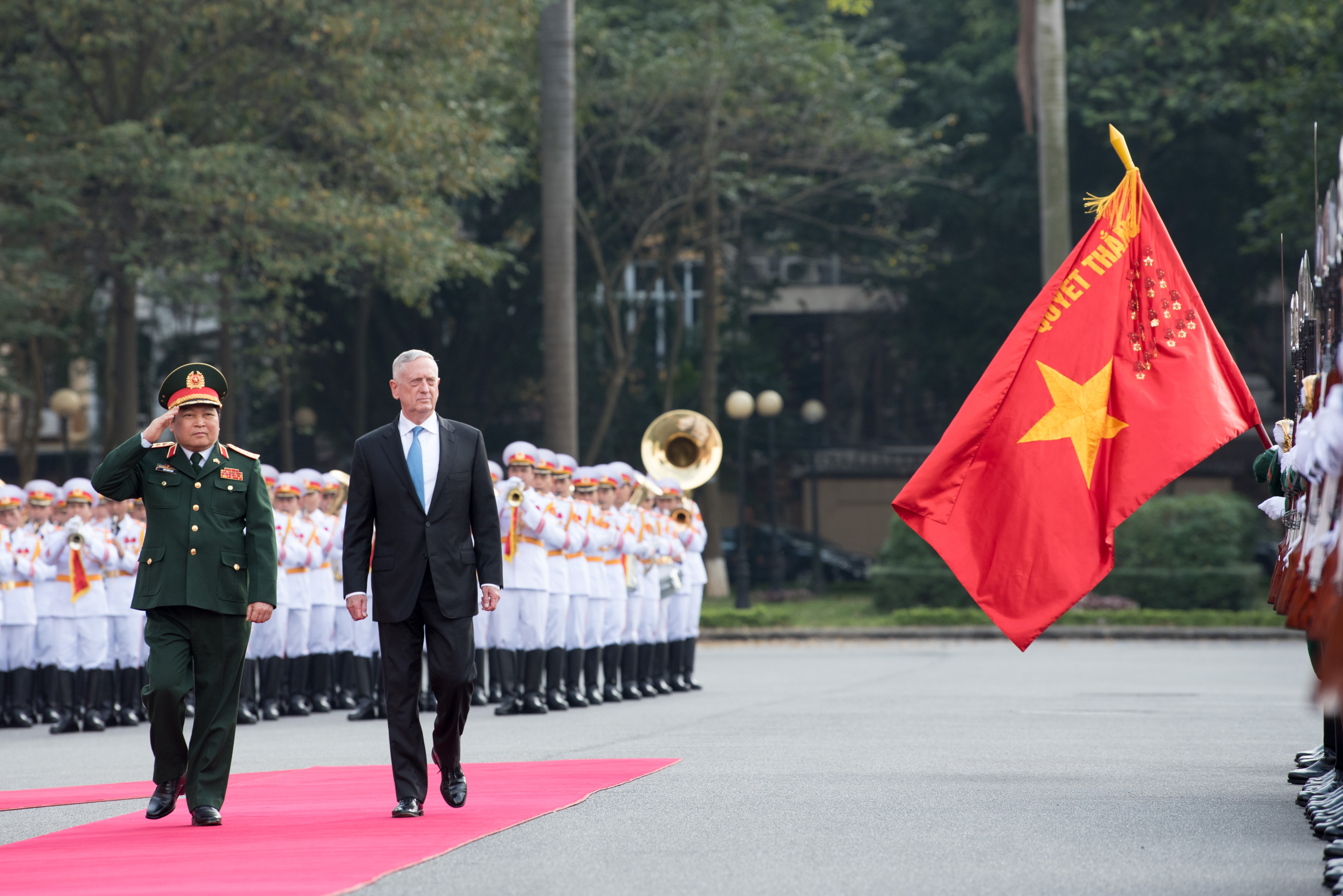
Vietnam People's Army Honor Guards hosting a ceremony to welcome U.S. SecDef Jim Mattis, featuring the force's war flag which is the Vietnamese flag defaced with the military's motto.

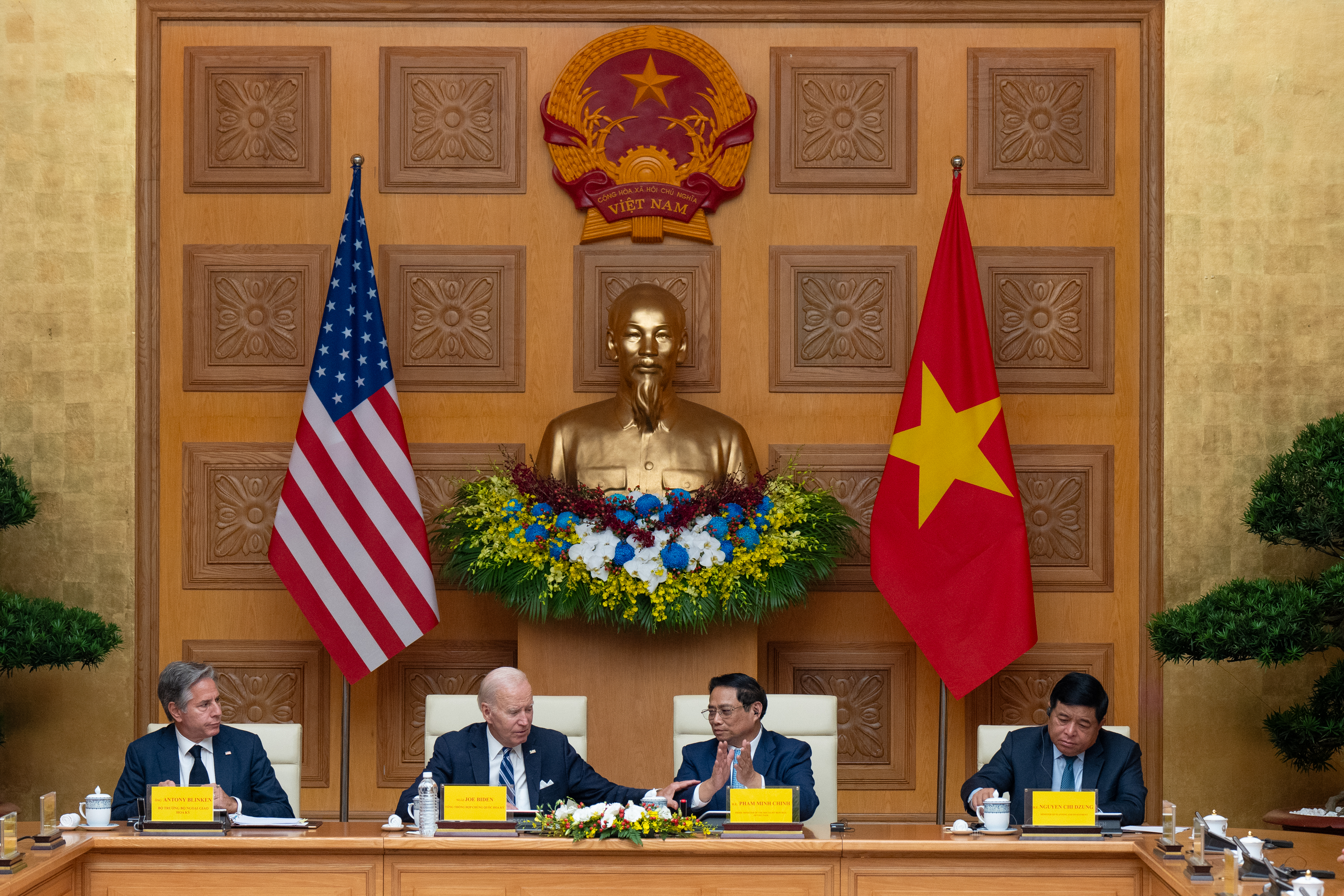
The Vietnamese flag being hoisted alongside the American flag in the Government Office during Biden's 2023 state visit to Vietnam.

== Similar flags ==
Flag of the Communist Party of Vietnam, designed with parallelism to the national flag of Vietnam.

Flag of Democratic Kampuchea, designed with similar layout and comparable symbolism to the Vietnamese flag.

Flag of the People's Republic of Kampuchea, with identical layout and symbolism to the Vietnamese flag.

Flag of the State of Cambodia, with similar layout and symbolism to the Vietnamese/NLF flag.

Flag of MPLA, with alleged inspiration drawn from the Vietnamese/NLF flag.

Flag of Morocco, with similar layout to the Vietnamese flag.

== See also ==
- Flag of South Vietnam
- List of flags of Vietnam
