= Quẻ Ly flag =

Empire of Vietnam
- Cờ quẻ Ly ('Lí trigram flag')
- Use: National flag and ensign
- Proportion: 2:3
- Adopted: 12 June 1945
- Relinquished: 30 August 1945
- Design: A field of gold with a centered red Lí trigram.
- Designed by: Lê Quý Trinh

The quẻ Ly flag (Vietnamese: cờ quẻ Ly lit. 'Lí trigram flag') is the national flag of the Empire of Vietnam. It was used from 12 June to 30 August 1945.

== History ==
The Long tinh flag, used by the Empire of Vietnam in its early years

After the Japanese coup d'état in French Indochina on 9 March 1945, Emperor Bảo Đại terminated the 1883 and the 1884 Treaty of Huế on the 11th of March. He declared the independence of the Empire of Vietnam under the protection of the Empire of Japan. By then, Vietnam continued using the Long tinh flag from its Đại Nam era as its national flag. The new government was established on the 17th of April 1945, led by Prime Minister Trần Trọng Kim.

In accordance with the imperial decree on 8 May 1945, Trần Trọng Kim appointed a council to change the state name, national flag, and national anthem. As citizens contributed their views, weekly newspaper Trung Bắc Chủ nhật published articles discussing the national flag referendum. The council decided to keep the name Vietnam and chose the quẻ Ly flag as its national flag, based on the design by Lê Quý Trinh, a citizen from Hưng Yên. On 12 June (3 May on the Chinese calendar), Emperor Bảo Đại signed Decree No. 52, designating this flag as the new national flag and abolishing all previous national flags.

The Empire of Vietnam consisted of three regions: Tonkin, Annam, and Cochinchina, but Cochinchina was fully under the administration of the Empire of Japan. On Sunday, 18 March at Vườn Ông Thượng, Saigon, a protest involving hundreds of thousands of people took place under the national flag to celebrate Vietnam's independence. On the 12th of June, the quẻ Ly flag was adopted, and by the 1st of July, flag-raising ceremonies were held across the provinces of Tonkin. In Hanoi, the flag-saluting ceremony took place at the Resident Superior's Palace. The ceremony took place in the flower garden in front of the City Hall in Thành Nam. On the 14th of August, before the Empire of Japan surrendered to the Allied powers, Cochinchina was given back to the Empire of Vietnam. On the 23rd, to celebrate the reunification of Vietnam, the Office of the High Commissioner for Cochinchina announced plans for a parade and a national flag salute.

On the 25th of August 1945, Emperor Bảo Đại issued an edict of abdication. The abdication ceremony took place on 30 August, and the quẻ Ly flag was lowered in favor of the flag of the new Democratic Republic of Vietnam. On 5 September 1945, the Provisional Government of the Democratic Republic of Vietnam signed Decree No. 5, abolishing the quẻ Ly flag and established the red flag with a yellow star, similar to the present-day flag of Vietnam.

== Symbolism ==
The yellow flag was a symbol of Vietnam. Per the I Ching, the Lí trigram has the following meanings:

Trùng minh dĩ lệ hồ chính, nãi hóa thành thiên hạ. (Twice the light shines to anchor to the center, transforming the world).

Tượng viết: Minh lưỡng tác; Ly, đại nhân dĩ kế minh chiếu hồ tứ phương. (Tượng states: "The light rises twice, the Lí trigram, the great man observing this continues shining the light to all four directions.")

Per the I Ching, in King Wen's Manifested bagua, the Lí trigram corresponds to the south of the diagram, forming the north–south axis of Kǎn and Lí. The scholar Trần Trọng Kim's choice of the quẻ Ly flag also carried another meaning, it represented the national flag of the South.

The flag's designer, Lê Quý Trinh, stated that the Lí trigram "corresponds to the South", and is a symbol of "enthusiasm, intensity, [...] progress, civilization". In the Lí ☲ trigram, the character công 工 (meaning "labor") appears, showing the importance of workers in the process of building a nation. Công also means "diligence, urging the Vietnamese people to prioritize hard work, if they wish for the nation to become prosperous."

== Design ==
The quẻ Ly flag has a 2:3 ratio, a gold background with a red Lí trigram at the center.

The dimensions of the flag and the Lí trigram correspond to the following construction sheets:

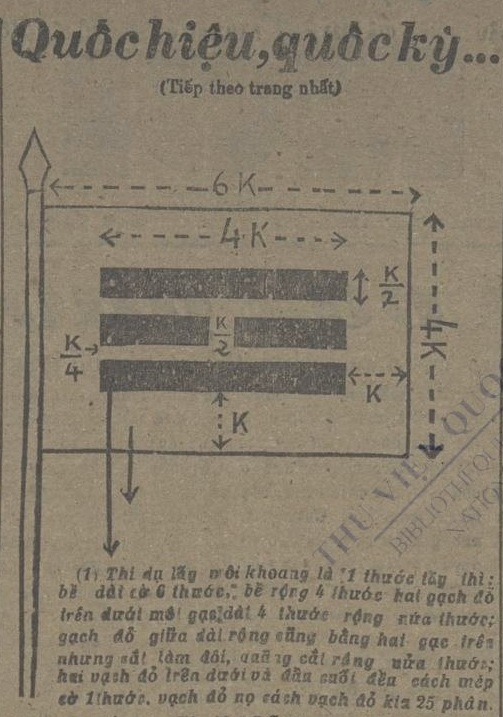
Drawing of the Lí trigram flag, based on Emperor Bảo Đại's Edict No. 52, published in the Tin Mới newspaper.

Construction sheet

== See also ==
- Flag of Vietnam
- Long tinh flag
- Flag of the State of Vietnam/Republic of Vietnam
