= Đăng đàn cung =

Anthem of the Nguyễn dynasty

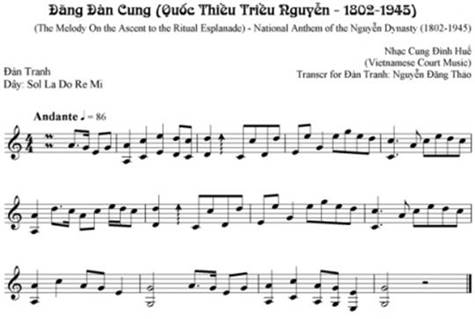
- Former royal anthem of Vietnam
- Lyrics: Nguyen Phuc Ung Thieu
- Music: Jean-Baptiste Chaigneau
- Adopted: 1802
- Relinquished: 1945

Audio sample
- Đăng Đàn cung, Prof. Liam C. Kelley's reconstruction from French protectorate era sheet music: file; help

Đăng đàn cung (chữ Hán: 登壇宮 lit. on the ascent to the esplanade) was the royal anthem of the Nguyễn dynasty, Vietnam.

== History ==
Following his ascension to the throne as emperor, Gia Long ordered composition an anthem thus "Đăng đàn cung" came into being.

Đăng đàn cung

Vietnamese name
- Vietnamese alphabet: Đăng đàn cung
- Hán-Nôm: 登壇宮

From the time of Gia Long, this piece was played when the emperors journeyed from the Citadel of Huế to Esplanade of Sacrifice to the Heaven and Earth. It was used in villages and courts to invoke divinities and honour monarchs. Under the reign of Bảo Đại, lyrics were added, composed by the musician Nguyễn Phúc Ưng Thiều (chữ Hán: 阮福膺昭). In the 1945 with the creation of the short-life Empire of Vietnam, prime minister Trần Trọng Kim selected "Đăng đàn cung" as Vietnam's national anthem. However, the Empire was dissolved soon after.

Nowadays, this piece of music is still played in Vietnam. It is used frequently in the tourist industry as a sampler of traditional Vietnamese music. Similarly classes in traditional music include this piece as a classic. It is usually played by traditional musicians in Huế at festivals, tourist attractions, but is also played at Buddhist funerals.

== Official lyrics ==
Kìa... núi vàng bể bạc,
Có sách Trời, sách Trời, định phần:
Một dòng ta gầy non song vững-chặt.
Đã ba ngàn, mấy trăm năm,
Bắc Nam cùng một nhà con Hồng cháu Lạc.
Văn-minh đào-tạo:
Màu gấm hoa càng đượm.
Rạng vẻ dòng-giống Tiên-Long.
Ấy, công gầy dựng,
Từ xưa đà khó-nhọc,
Nhớ công dày-nặng,
Lòng trung-quân đã sẵn.
Cố yêu nhau, với nhau một niềm
Nguyện nhà Việt Nam muôn đời thạnh-trị.

Chữ Nôm
箕... 𡶀黄𣷭鉑,
固冊𡗶, 冊𡗶, 定分.
𠬠𣳔些𤷍嫩滝凭鑕.
㐌𠀧𠦳, 買𤾓𢆥.
北南共𠬠茹, 𡥵鴻𡥙貉.
文明陶造:
牟錦花强㷋.
朗󰆴𣳔𥞖仙竜.
𠂎, 功𤷍鄧,
自初㐌苦縟,
汝功苔曩.
弄忠君諸産.
固𢞅饒, 貝饒𠬠念
願茹越南𨷈𠁀盛治.

The lyrics are provided by Hymnes et Pavillon d'Indochine.

== Lyrics from the 1940s ==
Lyrics by Nguyen Phuc Ung Thieu, used in the 1940s:

1.

Dậy dậy dậy mở mắt xem toàn châu,
Đèn khai hóa rạng khắp hoàn cầu.
Ngọn đường thông thương ngàn dặm, xe tàu điện, tàu nước, tàu bay.
Nghề khôn khéo chật khắp phương trời,
Càng ngày văn minh càng rộng, tranh cạnh lợi quyền.
Đất càng ngày càng rộng, dân giàu nước mạnh.
Nước càng ngày càng thịnh, của có thêm người khôn.

2.

Người Nam Quốc, một giống Tiên Rồng,
Thiệt giòng giai nhân tài tử, xưa rày gọi là nước tài ba.
Nền văn hiến, nặn đúc anh hùng,
Sẵn tài thông minh trời dựng, thêm nghề học hành.
Học càng ngày càng tiến, nghề nghiệp mở rộng.
Nước càng giàu càng mạnh, nòi giống thêm vẻ vang.

3.

Này Âu Á, gặp lúc phong trào,
Sẵn thấy gia công rèn tập, trăm nghề nghiệp đều biết đều hay.
Đường tiến hóa chạy suốt Tam Kỳ,
Càng ngày non sông càng đẹp, cám ơn bù trì.
Chúc Đại Pháp bình an, nước nhà thịnh trị,
Chúc Nam Việt vạn tuế, trường thọ vô cương.

== Vietnamese musical score ==
Họ phạn họ, xàng xê cống cống xê xàng xê
Cồng xàng xê cống, họ cống liu cống xê xàng
Xự xàng cống xê xàng xự, xê xàng xự xàng cống xàng xê
Cồng xàng xê cống, họ cống liu cống xê xàng
Xự xàng cống xê xàng xự, xê xàng xự họ phạn, họ
Xự họ phạn họ xự, xê xàng họ, phạn, họ
Xự họ phạn xự, xê xàng xự xàng cống xàng xê.

== New lyrics ==
=== Vietnamese ===
Lyrics by Ngoc Phan, used at the Millennial Anniversary of Hanoi in 2010:

Non Sông Vang Câu Ca Mừng

Khắp đất trời quê ta rộn rã lời ca,
Mừng đất nước đổi mới chan hoà.
Nhịp nhàng gái trai trẻ già, nắn cung đàn cùng hát lời ca,
Mừng đất nước đổi mới chan hoà,
Đời vui ấm no muôn nhà, tiếng ca cùng hoà.
Khắp đất trời quê ta tiếng ca đậm đà.

Các dân tộc Việt Nam cùng đón niềm vui,
Mừng đất nước rộn rã tiếng cười.
Bạn bè khắp nơi trao lời, chúc mừng đất nước đẹp tươi,
Mừng Thủ đô - Thành phố bao đời,
Sử xanh vẫn luôn rạng ngời chiến công tuyệt vời.
Bao bạn bè năm châu hát chung niềm vui.

Đây đất trời Thăng Long, Rồng chiếu hiển linh,
Ngàn năm sáng dải đất ân tình.
Cùng nhau sống trong thanh bình, tô thêm màu mảnh đất đẹp xinh,
Ngàn năm sáng dải đất ân tình,
Cùng vui sống trong thanh bình, tiếng ca ngọt lành.
Vui hát mừng Thủ đô xứng danh Hoà Bình.

Vui hát mừng Thủ đô xứng danh Hoà Bình,
Vui hát mừng Thủ đô xứng danh Hoà Bình

=== English ===
Throughout the country,
Celebrate the country of innovation chan.
Aging young girls, singing the same chorus,
Celebrate the renewal of the country,
The warmth of the house, the chorus of peace.
Around the land of our country, the song is strong.
Vietnamese people enjoy the joy,
Celebrate the country of laughter.
Friends all over the exchange, greet the beautiful country fresh,
Welcome to the capital -
Green Diox is always brilliant achievements.
Friends of five continents singing the same joy.
This is the land of Thang Long, Dragon epiphany,
Thousands of years of love.
Together live in peace, color more beautiful land beautiful,
Thousands of years of love,
Have fun living in peace, the sound of sweet.
Fun singing capital of Peace.
Fun singing capital to honor Peace,
Fun singing capital of Peace.
