= Empire of Vietnam =

Short-lived sponsored state of Imperial Japan in 1945

Empire of Vietnam Đế quốc Việt Nam (Vietnamese) (Note: Documents show the name as Việt-nam Đế-quốc, while in modern Vietnamese, it would be Đế quốc Việt Nam) 越南帝國 (Classical Chinese (Note: Some documents from 1945 feature the name in both Literary Chinese and Vietnamese.) and Japanese (Note: Nowadays generally ベトナム帝国 (Betonamu Teikoku) in Japanese.))
- 1945
- Left: Flag (before June 12); Right: Flag (June 12–August 30, 1945)
- Motto: Dân vi quý 民為貴 "The people are the most precious"
- Anthem: Đăng đàn cung "The Emperor Mounts His Throne" Việt Nam minh châu trời Đông "Viet Nam, the Pearl in the Eastern Sky"
- Imperial seal Hoàng Đế chi bảo 皇帝之寶

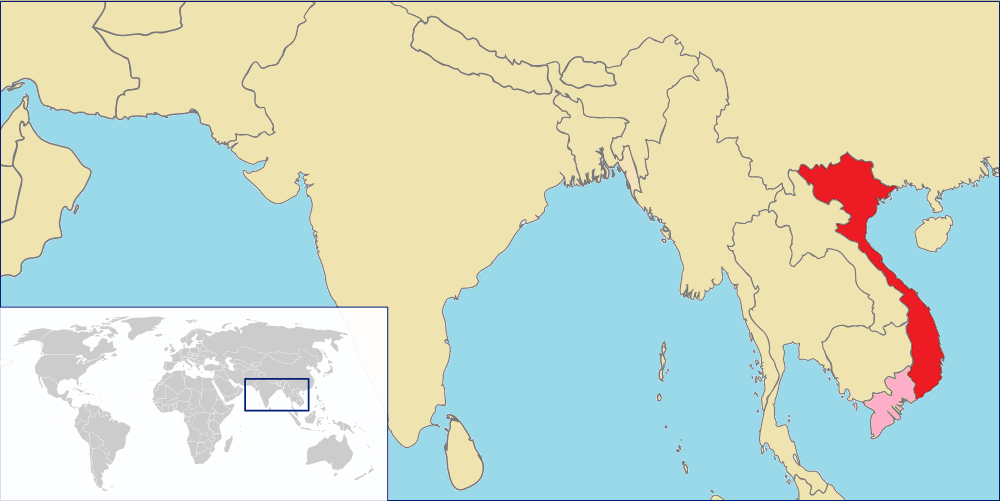
- The Empire of Vietnam under Japanese administration Red: Territory controlled by the Empire of Vietnam; Pink: Under direct control of the Empire of Japan
- Status: Sponsored state of Imperial Japan
- Capital: Thuận Hóa
- Common languages: Vietnamese, Japanese
- Religion: Confucianism; Folk religion Buddhism; Taoism; Shinto; Caodaism; Hòa Hảo; Catholicism
- Demonym: Vietnamese
- Government: Monarchy under military occupation
- Emperor
  - 1945: Bảo Đại
- Chief of Cabinet (Note: Head of Government)
  - 1945: Trần Trọng Kim
- Historical era: World War II
  - Japanese coup: 9 March 1945
  - Proclamation of independence: 11 March 1945
  - Cabinet formed: 17 April 1945
  - Reclaiming Nam Kỳ: 14 August 1945
  - August Revolution: 19 August 1945
  - Disestablished: 30 August 1945
- Currency: Vietnamese văn, French Indochinese piastre, Japanese military currency
Preceded by
French Annam
French Tonkin
French Cochinchina
Succeeded by
Democratic Republic of Vietnam
War in southern Vietnam (1945–1946)
Chinese occupation of northern Vietnam, 1945–1946
- Today part of: Vietnam

The Empire of Vietnam (Note: Vietnamese: Đế quốc Việt Nam; Literary Chinese and contemporary Japanese: 越南帝國; Vietnamese: Việt Nam Đế quốc; Japanese: Etsunan Teikoku; Modern Japanese: ベトナム帝国, romanized: Betonamu Teikoku) was a short-lived sponsored state of Imperial Japan between March 11 and August 30, 1945. It was a member of the Greater East Asia Co-Prosperity Sphere and was ruled by the Nguyễn dynasty. The Empire was proclaimed when Emperor Bảo Đại declared independence for Vietnam (Tonkin and Annam) from French protection. At the end of its existence, on 14 August 1945, the empire also successfully reclaimed Cochinchina as part of Vietnam.

== History ==
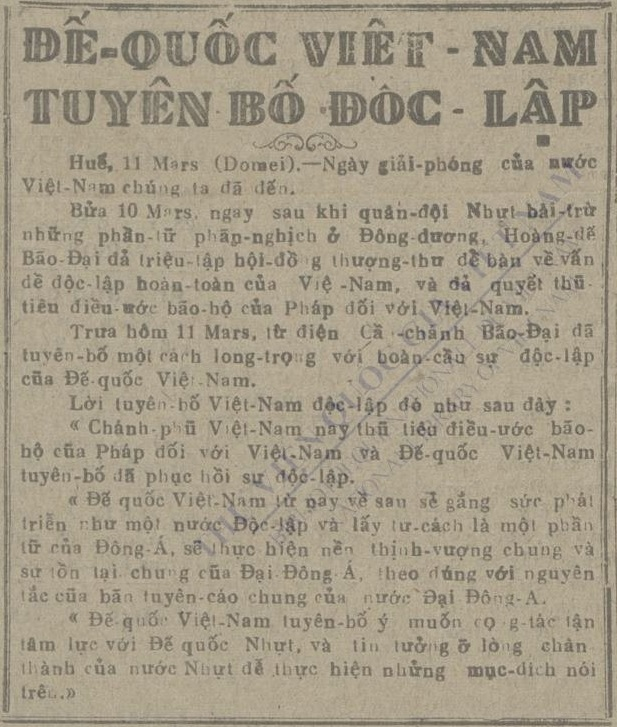
Announcement of the independence of the Empire of Vietnam, reported on Sài Gòn newspaper.

On March 10, 1945, Masayuki Yokoyama, a senior Japanese diplomat, entered the royal palace to tell Bảo Đại that Tokyo expected him to head a government dedicated to 'maintaining social order.' Yokoyama also told him that Japan "was prepared to acknowledge an Annamite declaration of independence within the Greater East Asia Co-Prosperity Sphere. Undoubtedly much relieved, Bảo Đại instructed Phạm Quỳnh, his minister of the interior (and de facto premier), to draft a proclamation in French and show it to Yokoyama, who found it proper except for a clause expressing gratitude to the Japanese armed forces. That passage deleted, Phạm Quỳnh scheduled a meeting of the full cabinet for the next morning, 11 March, where he read out the text solemnly in the presence of the monarch. The 'government of Vietnam' abrogated the 1884 protectorate treaty signed with the French, proclaimed its independence, and affirmed its determination to collaboration with Japan." The Trần Trọng Kim Cabinet was established on 17 April 1945.

=== Decline ===
The Kim Cabinet's achievements were soon overshadowed by external pressure and revolutionary activity. On July 26, the leaders of the Allies issued a declaration demanding the unconditional surrender of Japan. Japan was on the defensive and quickly losing ground, and its aim was no longer to win the war, but simply to find an honorable ceasefire. On the Vietnamese front, the possibility of future punishment by the Allied forces for collaboration with the Japanese discouraged many possible supporters of Kim. His ministers and public servant corps began to dwindle in number. The Imperial Commissioner of the North (Tonkin), Phan Kế Toại, accompanied by his son and other Viet Minh sympathisers and secret communists such as Nguyễn Mạnh Hà and Hoàng Minh Giám, submitted his resignation. Nguyễn Xuân Chữ, a leader of the Vietnamese Patriotic Party (Viet Nam Ái quốc Đảng) and one of the five members of Cường Để's National Reconstruction Committee, refused the offer of replacing Toại. Returning to Thuận Hóa, Kim arrived to find increasing conflict among his ministers. Chương wanted credit for arranging the integration of the three ceded cities and southern Vietnam to Kim's government and was regarded as having Prime Ministerial designs himself. The government meetings of August 5 and 6 were headlined by personal disputes and the resignation of the ministers of interior, economy, and supplies. Hồ Tá Khanh, the economic minister, went further and demanded the resignation of the government. Khanh proposed that the communist Viet Minh be given a chance to govern because of its strength. The government resigned on August 7. Bảo Đại asked Kim to form a new government, but the end of the war made this impossible.

On 6 and 9 August 1945, respectively, the atomic bombings of Hiroshima and Nagasaki took place; on August 8, 1945, the Soviet Union declared war on Japan and invaded Manchuria, and Japan's resistance to the Allies was quickly ended. Japan decided to give Kim and Vietnamese nationalists the full independence and territorial unification that they had sought for decades. Kim was urged many times to come to Saigon to officially accept control of Nam Bộ. Multiple factors prevented Kim from leaving the capital. From August 8 onward, Phạm Khắc Hòe, Bảo Đại's office director, was instructed by Tôn Quang Phiệt (the future chairman of the Viet Minh's Revolutionary Committee in Huế) to persuade the Emperor to abdicate voluntarily.

In order to carry out his mission, Hòe persistently disrupted Kim's activities, particularly by citing Kim's failure to call the most influential figures to Thuận Hóa to form a new government. Meanwhile, Interior Minister Nam, cited the communist uprisings in Thanh Hóa and Quảng Ngãi in central Vietnam to discourage Kim from traveling to Saigon. The acceptance of the handover of the South (Cochinchina) was thus temporarily placed at the feet of the Council of the South.

On August 14, Bảo Đại appointed Nguyễn Văn Sâm, former president of the Journalists' Syndicate, to the post of Imperial Commissioner of the South. Sâm left Thuận Hóa for Saigon. However, he was delayed en route as the Viet Minh had taken advantage of the military power vacuum caused by the Japanese surrender to launch a general insurrection with the aim of seizing control of the country.

=== Viet Minh takeover ===
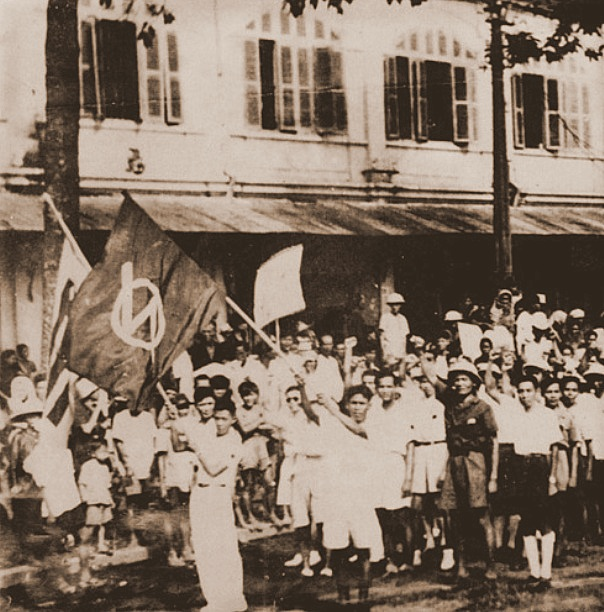
Trotskyist League demonstration in Saigon, 21 August 1945.

In August, Vietnam went through a period regarded as one of its most eventful phases, amidst the backdrop of rapid change in global politics. On the one hand, the Allies began to put into effect their postwar plans for Vietnam, which included the disarmament of Japanese troops and the division of Vietnam into spheres of influence. The Japanese military and civilian personnel in Vietnam were hamstrung by the unconditional surrender of their government and the possibility of Allied retribution. With respect to the Vietnamese, the Japanese were split psychologically and ideologically. Some Japanese favoured the Viet Minh, releasing Communist political prisoners, arming the Viet Minh front, and even volunteering their services. Others, including senior military officers, wanted to use their forces to support Kim's government and to crush the communists. Amid the political confusion and power vacuum engulfing the country, a race to power by diverse Vietnamese political groups took place.

On the eve of Japan's surrender, Kim and his supporters tried to take control of the situation. On August 12, Kim's outgoing government was retained as "Provisional Government" to oversee the day-to-day running of the country. Kim asked Bảo Đại to issue an imperial order on August 14 repealing the treaties of Saigon of 1862 and 1874, thus removing the last French claims to sovereign rights over Vietnam. Messengers were sent from the central capital to northern and southern Vietnam to reunify diverse groups under the central government in Thuận Hóa, but they were apprehended en route by the Viet Minh.

Even though Bảo Đại's messengers were cut off, non-communist leaders in northern and southern Vietnam attempted to challenge the Viet Minh. In Bắc Bộ, Nguyễn Xuân Chữ obtained Kim's approval to form the Committee for National Salvation, and he was appointed by Kim as chairman of the Political Directorate of Bắc Bộ. In Nam Bộ, on August 17, it was announced that all non-Viet Minh factions, including Trotskyists and the southern religious sects of Cao Đài and Hòa Hảo, had joined forces to create the Mặt trận Quốc gia Thống nhất (National Unified Front). Trần Quang Vinh, the Cao Đài leader, and Huỳnh Phú Sổ, the founder of the Hòa Hảo, also issued a communique proclaiming an alliance. On August 19 in Saigon, the Vanguard Youth organised their second official oath-taking ceremony, vowing to defend Vietnamese independence at all costs. The next day, Hồ Vân Nga assumed the interim office of Imperial Commissioner and appointed Kha Vạn Cân, the Vanguard Youth leader, commander of Saigon and Chợ Lớn. Nguyễn Văn Sâm's arrival in Saigon on August 22 provided the National Unified Front with the official declaration of national independence and territorial reunification.

Nevertheless, the Viet Minh prevailed in the power struggle with their August Revolution. On August 17, Viet Minh cadres in Hanoi took control of a mass demonstration organised by the General Association of Civil Servants. The rally was originally aimed at celebrating independence and territorial reunification and supporting Kim's government. Two days later, Nguyễn Xuân Chữ was forced to hand over authority to the Viet Minh. Combined with the official cease-fire of the Japanese army on August 21, this threw Kim's government into disarray and it collapsed. On August 23, the Viet Minh seized power in Huế. Two days later on August 25, Bảo Đại officially abdicated, and Nguyễn Văn Sâm handed over power to the Viet Minh in Saigon. The Empire of Vietnam had fallen along with Japan's Greater East Asia Co-Prosperity Sphere.

== Policies ==
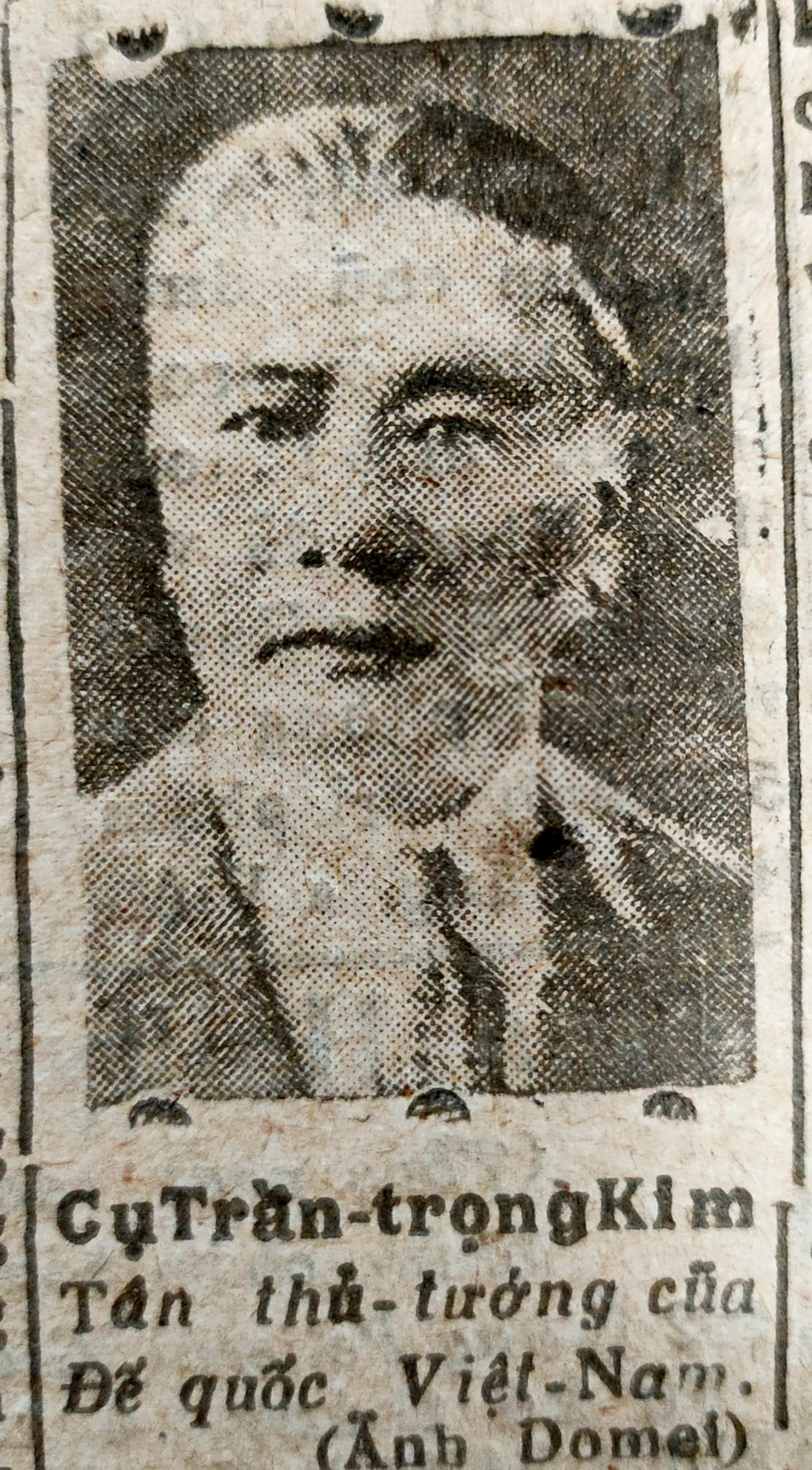
Trần Trọng Kim as new prime minister of the Empire of Vietnam. Photograph by Domei.

=== Constitutional issues ===
Kim and his ministers spent a substantial amount of time on constitutional matters at their first meeting in Huế on 4 May 1945. One of their first resolutions was to alter the national name to Việt Nam. This was seen as a significant and urgent task. It implied territorial unity; "Việt Nam" had been Emperor Gia Long's choice for the name of the country since he unified the modern territory of Việt Nam in 1802. Furthermore, this was the first time that Vietnamese nationalists in the northern, central and southern regions of the country officially recognized this name. In March, activists in the North always mentioned Đại Việt (Great Việt), the name used before the 15th century by the Lê dynasty and its predecessors, while those in the South used Vietnam, and the central leaders used An Nam (Peaceful South) or Đại Nam (Great South, which was used by the Nguyễn Lords, precursor of Nguyễn dynasty).

Kim also renamed the three regions of the country—the northern (former Tonkin or Bắc Kỳ) became Bắc Bộ, the central region (former Annam or Trung Kỳ) became Trung Bộ, and the southern areas (former Cochinchina or Nam Kỳ) became Nam Bộ. Kim did this even though at the time the Japanese had only given him direct authority over the northern and central regions of Vietnam. When France had finished its conquest of Vietnam in 1885, only southern Vietnam was made a direct colony under the name of Cochinchina. The northern and central regions were designated as protectorates as Tonkin and Annam. When the Empire of Vietnam was proclaimed, the Japanese retained direct control of Cochinchina, in the same way as their French predecessors.

Thuận Hóa, the pre-colonial name for Huế, was restored. Kim's officials worked to find a French substitute for the word "Annamite", which was used to denote Vietnamese people and their characteristics as described in French literature and official use. "Annamite" was considered derogatory, and it was replaced with "Vietnamien" (Vietnamese). Apart from Thuận Hóa, these terms have been internationally accepted since Kim ordered the changes. Given that the French colonial authorities emphatically distinguished the three regions of "Tonkin", "Annam", and "Cochinchina" as separate entities, implying a lack of national culture or political integration, Kim's first acts were seen as symbolic and the end of generations of frustration among Vietnamese intelligentsia and revolutionaries.

On 12 June 1945, Kim selected a new national flag—a yellow, rectangular banner with four horizontal red stripes modeled after the quẻ Ly (☲, one of bagua) in the Book of Changes—and a new national anthem, the old hymn Đăng đàn cung (The King Mounts His Throne). This decision ended three months of speculation concerning a new flag for Vietnam.

=== Educational reform ===
Kim's government strongly emphasised educational reform, focusing on the development of technical training, particularly the use of Vietnamese alphabet (chữ Quốc Ngữ) as the primary language of instruction. After less than two months in power, Kim organized the first primary examinations in Vietnamese, the language he intended to use in the advanced tests. Education minister Hoàng Xuân Hãn strove to Vietnamese public secondary education. His reforms took more than four months to achieve their results, and have been regarded as a stepping stone for the successor Viet Minh government's launch of compulsory mass education. In July, when the Japanese decided to grant Vietnam full independence and territorial unification, Kim's government was about to begin a new round of reform, by naming a committee to create a new national education system.

=== Judicial reform ===
The Justice minister Trịnh Đình Thảo launched an attempt at judicial reform. In May 1945, he created the Committee for the Reform and Unification of Laws in Huế, which he headed. His ministry reevaluated the sentences of political prisoners, releasing a number of anti-French activists and restoring the civil rights of others. This led to the release of a number of Communist cadres who returned to their former cells, and actively participated in the destruction of Kim's government.

=== Encouragement of mass political participation ===
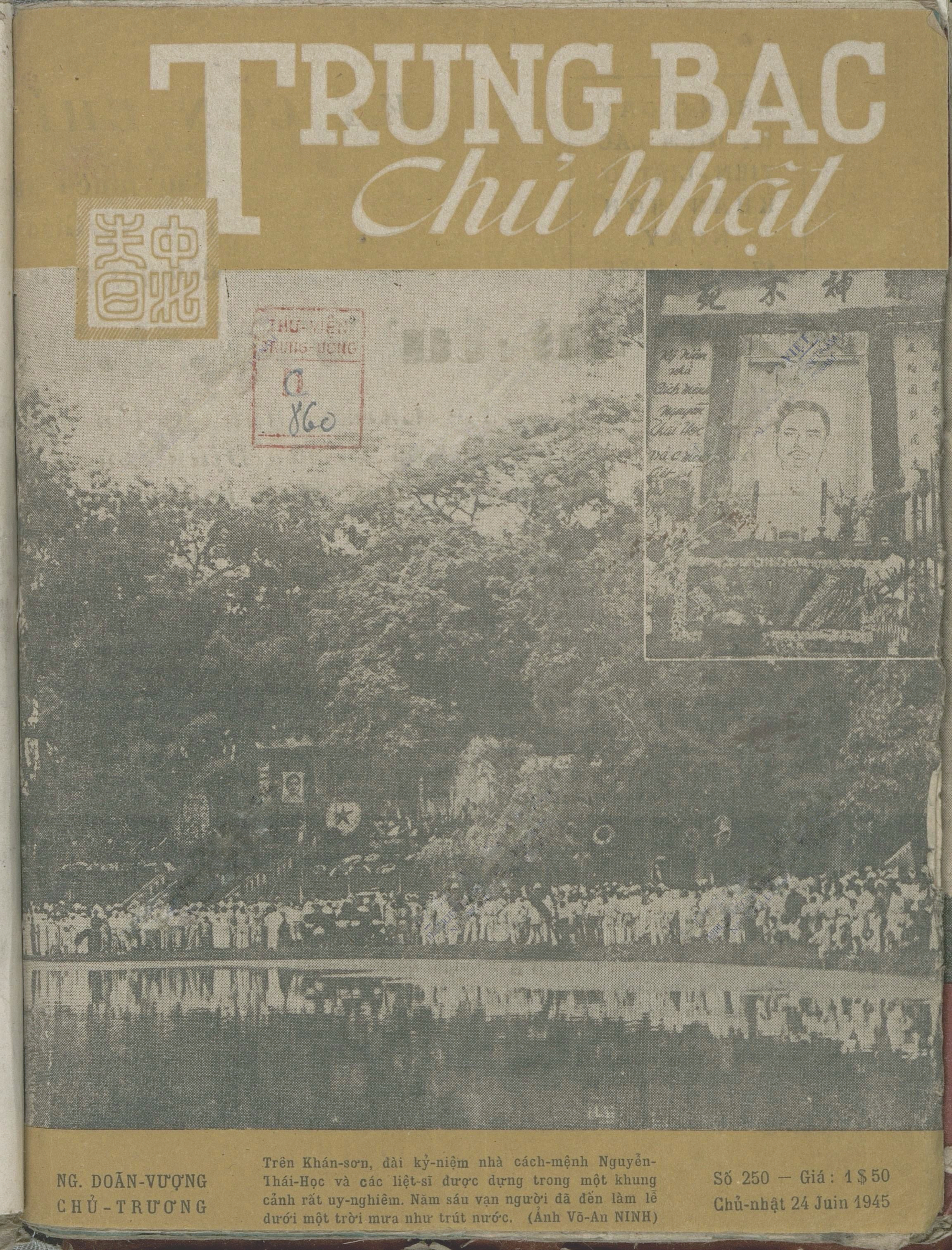
Commemoration of the Yên Bái Uprising in a weekly newspaper, Hanoi June 1945.

One of the most notable changes implemented by Kim's government was the encouragement of mass political participation. In memorial ceremonies, Kim honoured all national heroes, ranging from the legendary national founders, the Hùng kings to slain anti-French revolutionaries such as Nguyễn Thái Học, the leader of the Vietnamese Nationalist Party (Việt Nam Quốc Dân Đảng) who was executed with twelve comrades in 1930 in the aftermath of the Yên Bái mutiny.

A committee was organised to select a list of national heroes for induction into the Temple of Martyrs (Nghĩa Liệt Tử). City streets were renamed. In Huế, Jules Ferry was replaced on the signboards of a main thoroughfare by Lê Lợi, the founder of the Lê dynasty who expelled the Chinese in 1427. General Trần Hưng Đạo, who twice repelled Mongol invasions in the 13th century, replaced Paul Bert. On August 1, the new mayor of Hanoi, Trần Văn Lai, ordered the demolition of French built statues in the city parks in his campaign to Wipe Out Humiliating Remnants. Similar campaigns were enacted in southern Vietnam in late August. Meanwhile, the freedom of the press was instituted, resulting in the publication of the pieces of anti-French movements and critical essays on French collaborators. Heavy criticism was even extended to Nguyễn Hữu Độ, the great-grandfather of Bảo Đại who was notable in assisting the French conquest of Đại Nam in the 1880s. Kim put particular emphasis on the mobilisation of youth. Youth Minister Phan Anh, attempted to centralise and heavily regulate all youth organizations, which had proliferated immediately after the Japanese coup. On May 25, an imperial order decreed an inclusive, hierarchical structure for youth organizations. At the apex was the National Youth Council, a consultative body, which advised the minister. Similar councils were to be organised down to the district level. Meanwhile, young people were asked to join the local squads or groups, from provincial to communal levels. They were given physical training and were charged with maintaining security in their communes. Each provincial town had a training centre, where month-long paramilitary courses were on offer.

The government also established a national center for the Advanced Front Youth (Thanh niên tiền tuyến) in Huế. It was inaugurated on June 2, with the intention of being the centrepiece for future officer training. In late July, regional social youth centers were established in Hanoi, Huế, and Saigon. In Hanoi, the General Association of Students and Youth (Tổng hội Sinh viên và Thanh niên) was animated by the fervor of independence. The City University in Hanoi became a focal point of political agitation. By May and June, there was evidence that communist Cadres of the Viet Minh front, had infiltrated the university's youth and famine relief associations. In the face of the rising Viet Minh front, the Japanese attempted to contact its leaders, but their messengers were killed by the Viet Minh. The Kempeitai (Japanese MP and also secret police) retaliated, arresting hundreds of pro-communist Vietnamese youths in late June.

=== Territorial unification ===
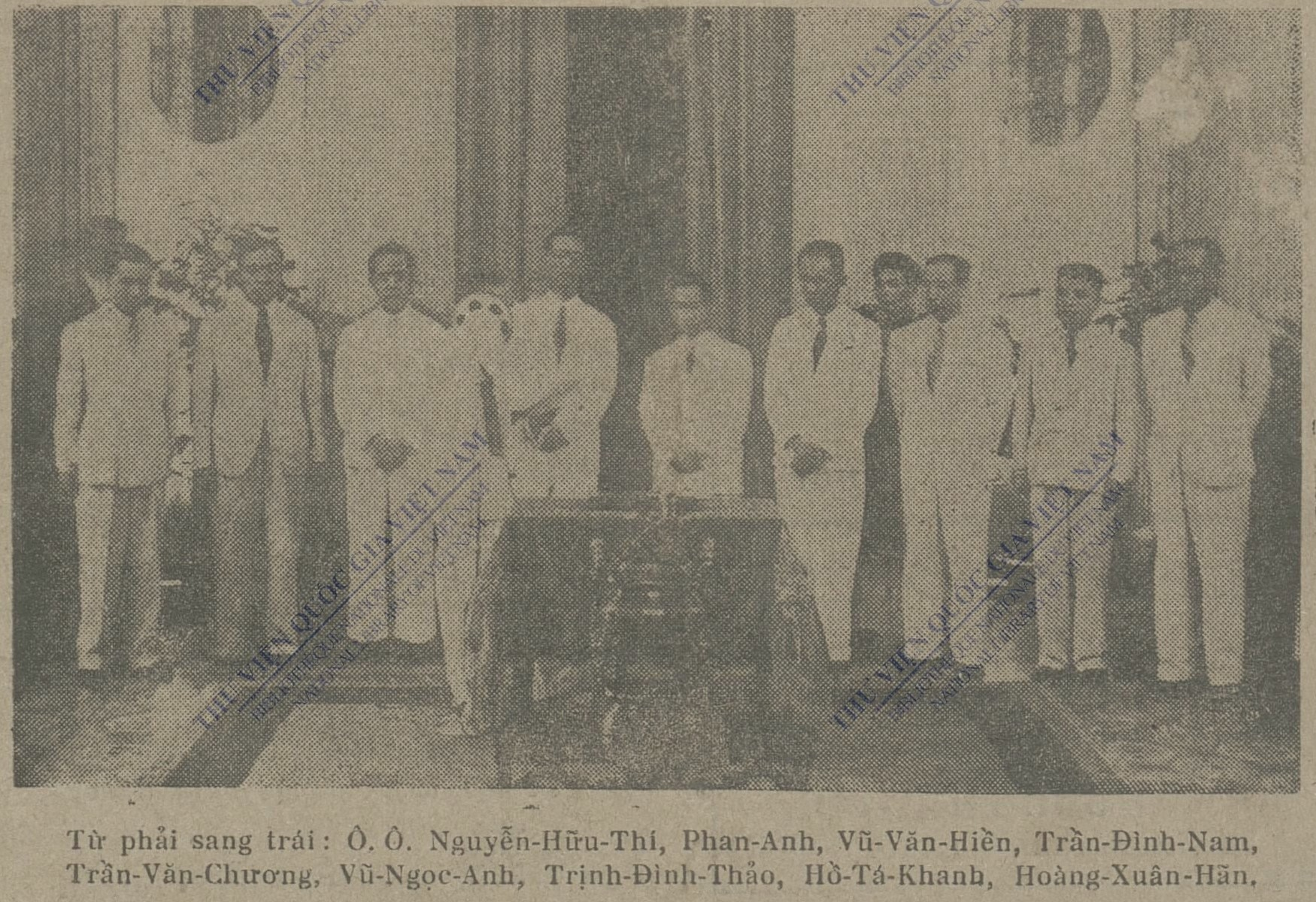
Trần Trọng Kim cabinet, May 1945.

The most notable achievement of Kim's Empire of Vietnam was the successful negotiation with Japan for the territorial unification of the nation. The French had subdivided Vietnam into three separate regions: Cochinchina (in 1862), and Annam and Tonkin (both in 1884). Cochinchina was placed under direct rule while the latter two were officially designated as protectorates. Immediately after terminating French rule, the Japanese authorities were not enthusiastic about the territorial unification of Vietnam. However, after the formation of Kim's cabinet in April, Japan quickly agreed to transfer what was then Tonkin and Annam to Kim's authority, although it retained control of the cities of Hanoi, Hải Phòng, and Đà Nẵng. Meanwhile, southern Vietnam remained under direct Japanese control, just as Cochinchina had been under French rule.

Beginning in May 1945, Foreign Minister Trần Văn Chương negotiated with the Japanese in Hanoi for the transfer of the three cities to Vietnamese rule, but the Japanese stalled because Hanoi and Haiphong were seen as strategic points in their war effort. It was only in June and July that the Japanese allowed the process of national unification to take place. On June 16, Bảo Đại issued a decree proclaiming the impending reunification of Vietnam. On June 29, General Yuitsu Tsuchihashi signed a series of decrees transferring some of the duties of the government (including customs, information, youth, and sports) to the governments of Vietnam, Laos and Cambodia, effective July 1. Bảo Đại then issued imperial orders establishing four committees to work on a new regime: the National Consultative Committee (Hội đồng Tư vấn Quốc gia); a committee of fifteen to work on the creation of a constitution; a committee of fifteen to examine administrative reform, legislation, and finance; and a committee for educational reform. For the first time, leaders from southern regions were invited to join these committees.

Other developments in southern Vietnam in early July were seen as preparatory Japanese steps towards granting territorial reunification to Vietnam. In early July, when southern Vietnam was abuzz with the spirit of independence and mass political participation due to the creation of the Vanguard Youth organizations in Saigon and other regional centres, Governor Minoda announced the organization of the Hội nghị Nam (Council of "the South", i.e. Cochinchina) to facilitate his governance. This council was charged with advising the Japanese based on questions submitted to it by the Japanese and for overseeing provincial affairs. Minoda underlined that its primary aim was to make the Vietnamese population believe that they had to collaborate with the Japanese, because "if the Japanese lose the war, the independence of Indochina would not become complete." At the inauguration of the Council of the South on July 21, Minoda implicitly referred to the unification of Vietnam. Trần Văn An was appointed as the president of the council, and Kha Vạn Cân, a leader of the Vanguard Youth, was appointed to be his deputy.

On July 13, Kim arrived in Hanoi to negotiate directly with Governor-General Tsuchihashi. Tsuchihashi agreed to transfer control of Hanoi, Hải Phòng, and Đà Nẵng to Kim's government, taking effect on July 20. After protracted negotiation, Tsuchihashi agreed that the south (Cochinchina) would be united with the Empire of Vietnam and that Kim would attend the unification ceremonies on August 8 in Saigon.

== Military ==
After the creation of the Empire of Vietnam, the Japanese began raising an army to help police the local population. The Vietnamese Imperial Army was officially established by the IJA 38th Army to maintain order in the new country. The Vietnamese Imperial Army was under the control of Japanese lieutenant general Yuitsu Tsuchihashi, who served as adviser to the Empire of Vietnam.

== Cabinet ==
- Trần Trọng Kim – Prime Minister
- Trần Văn Chương – Foreign Affairs
- Phan Anh – Youth
- Hoàng Xuân Hãn – Education & Fine Arts
- Vũ Ngọc Anh – Public Works
- Nguyễn Xuân Chữ – Agriculture
- Trịnh Đình Thảo – Justice

== See also ==
- French Indochina in World War II
  - Japanese invasion of French Indochina
  - Japanese coup d'état in French Indochina
  - Vietnamese famine of 1944–1945
- Kingdom of Kampuchea (1945)
- Kingdom of Luang Prabang (1945)
- Democratic Republic of Vietnam
- Civil conflicts in Vietnam (1945–1949)
- War in southern Vietnam (1945–1946)
- Chinese occupation of northern Vietnam, 1945–1946
- State of Vietnam

== Notes ==
Preceded by Đại Nam	Empire of Vietnam; 1945	Succeeded by Democratic Republic of Việt Nam; Republic of Cochinchina
