= Long tinh flag =

Historical Vietnamese flag (Imperial flag of Đại Nam)

Empire of Vietnam

The Long tinh flag (Vietnamese: Long tinh kỳ, Chinese characters: 龍星旗 lit. 'Dragon star banner'), also known as the Long Bội Tinh flag, is a flag with a yellow field and a vertical red stripe at the center, designed based on the ribbon of the Đại Nam Long tinh. The flag was originally used as a ceremonial flag to welcome the emperor, and was later adopted as the national flag of Đại Nam in the early 1940s.

== History ==
From the reign of Emperor Khải Định, during his northern inspection tour to Bắc Kỳ in 1918, records mention an "Annamese flag" being flown together with the French tricolour and those of “allied nations” for the people to welcome the emperor on his visit to his native land of Thanh Hóa, and later to Hà Nội and Hải Phòng. However, it remains unclear whether this flag was the Long tinh flag.

The design of the Long tinh flag was created by Emperor Khải Định, based on the ribbon of the Long Bội Tinh, featuring a vertical red stripe on a yellow field. In 1922, the flag accompanied Emperor Khải Định during his visit to France. Visual records show the Long tinh flag appearing during the Huế court ceremony of "Tứ tuần khánh thọ", celebrating the emperor's 40th birthday in 1924. It was regarded as a flag of the imperial court of Đại Nam and was used when the emperor was in attendance.

During World War II, Emperor Bảo Đại formally designated the Long tinh flag as the first national flag. According to a speech delivered at a school in Hải Phòng, the red colour of the flag represented the happiness of the people, while the surrounding yellow symbolized the dignity of the Emperor. The book Hymnes et pavillons d'Indochine, published in 1941 by the Imprimerie d'Extrême-Orient in Hanoi, noted this flag as the national flag (drapeau national). The Huế court designated the Long tinh flag as the national flag to be used by the public on festive and celebratory occasions; meanwhile, a yellow flag bearing the French tricolour in the canton (the protectorate flag) was flown by government offices.

The Long tinh flag remained in use until mid-1945, when the Trần Trọng Kim government officially adopted the Ly trigram flag (Vietnamese: Cờ Quẻ Ly) as the national flag of the Empire of Vietnam.

== Images ==
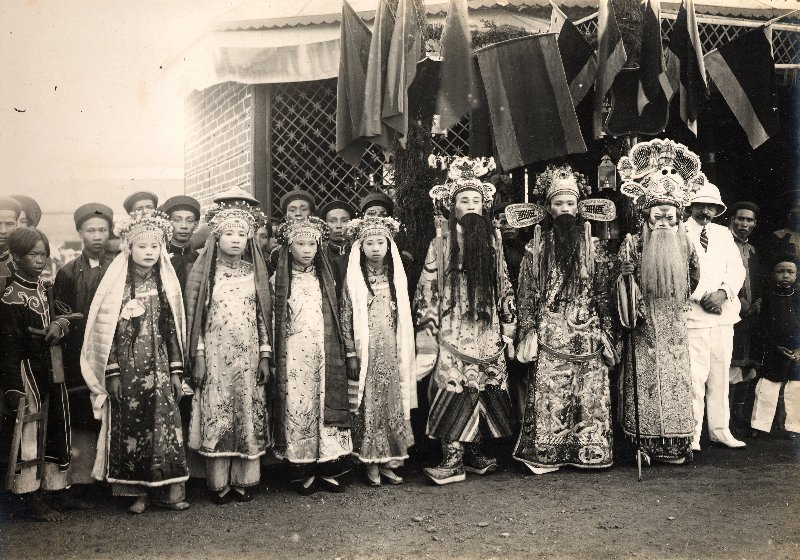
At the Tu tuan dai khanh (40th birthday jubilee) of Emperor Khải Định in 1924

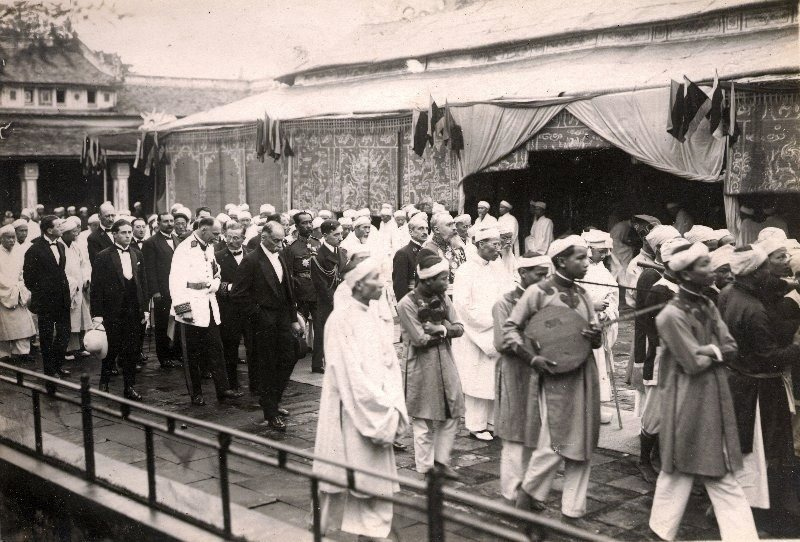
At the funeral of Emperor Khải Định in 1925

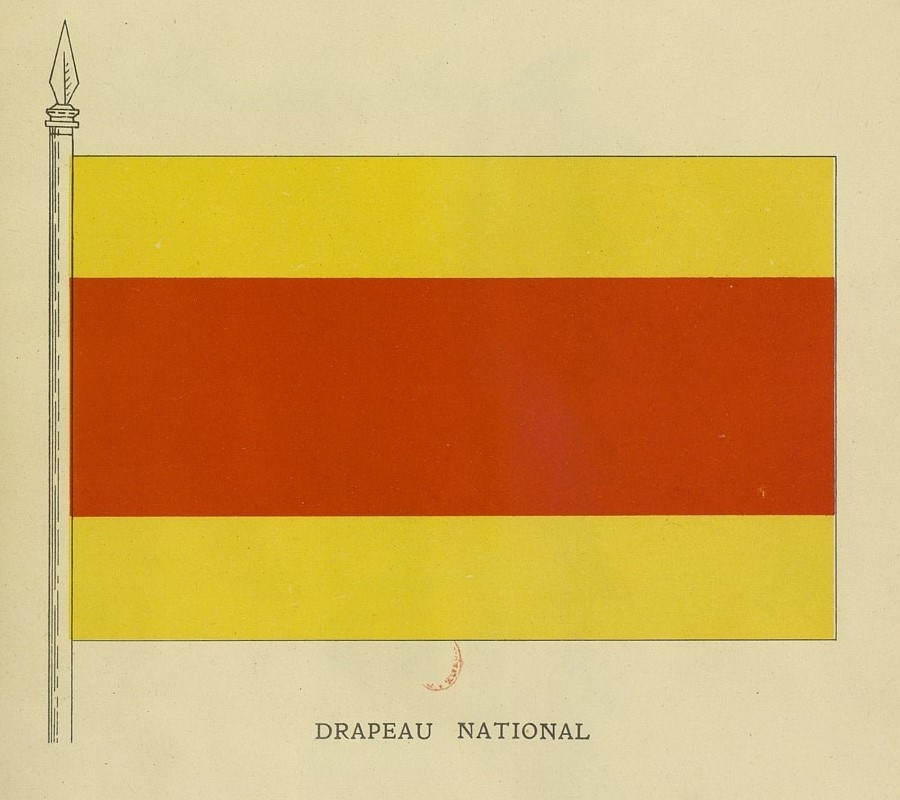
In the book Hymnes et pavillons d'Indochine, 1941

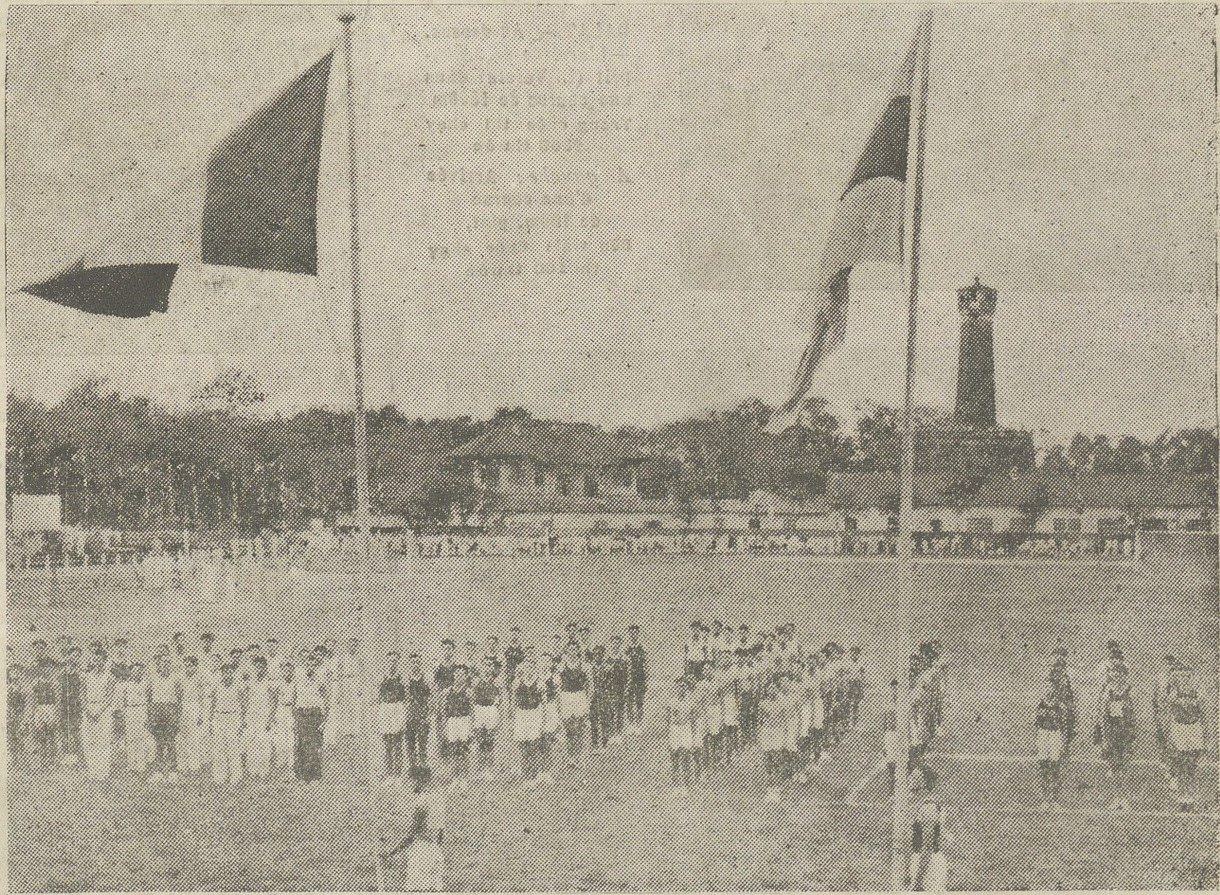
Students of Hanoi University saluting the flags of France and Đại Nam in 1942

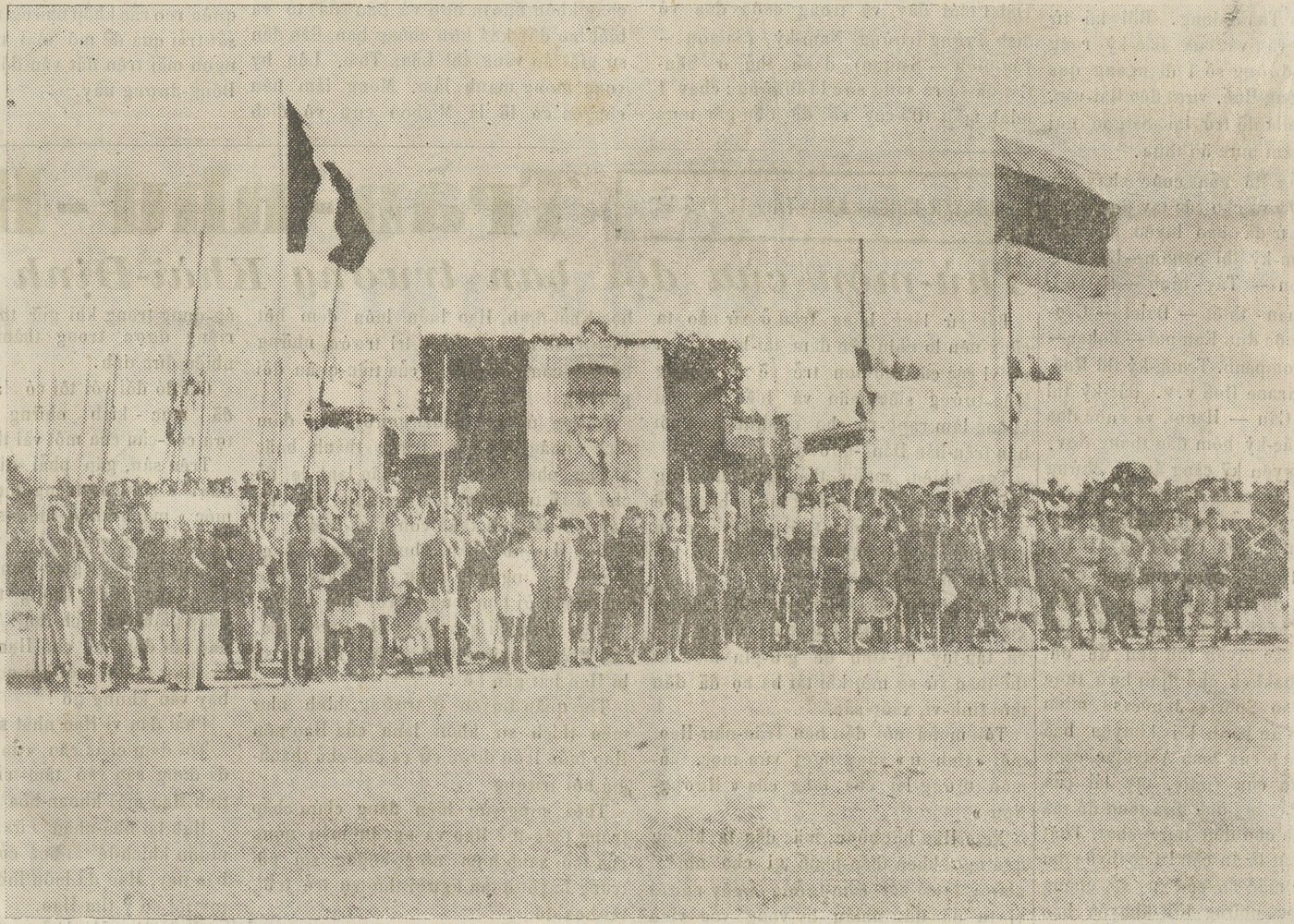
Inauguration ceremony of a stadium in Ninh Bình

A propaganda poster of the French Vichy administration in Indochina

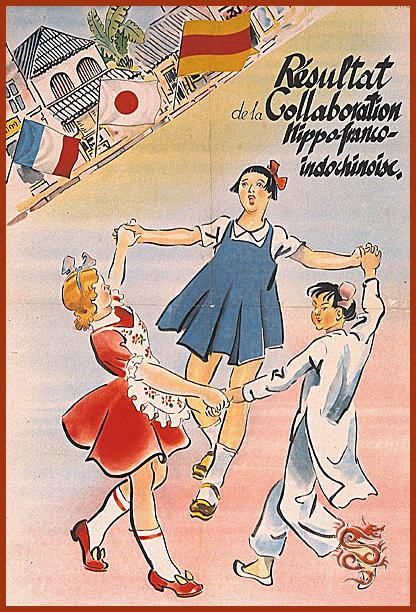
A caricature by the Free France criticizing the policies of Decoux in Indochina

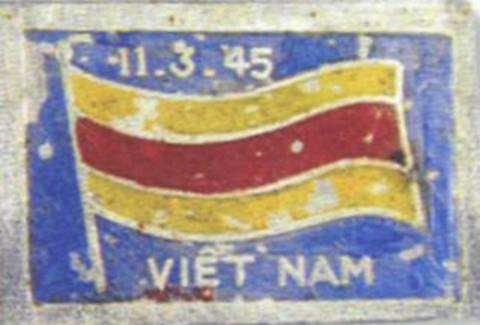
A commemorative stamp celebrating the declaration of independence of the Empire of Vietnam

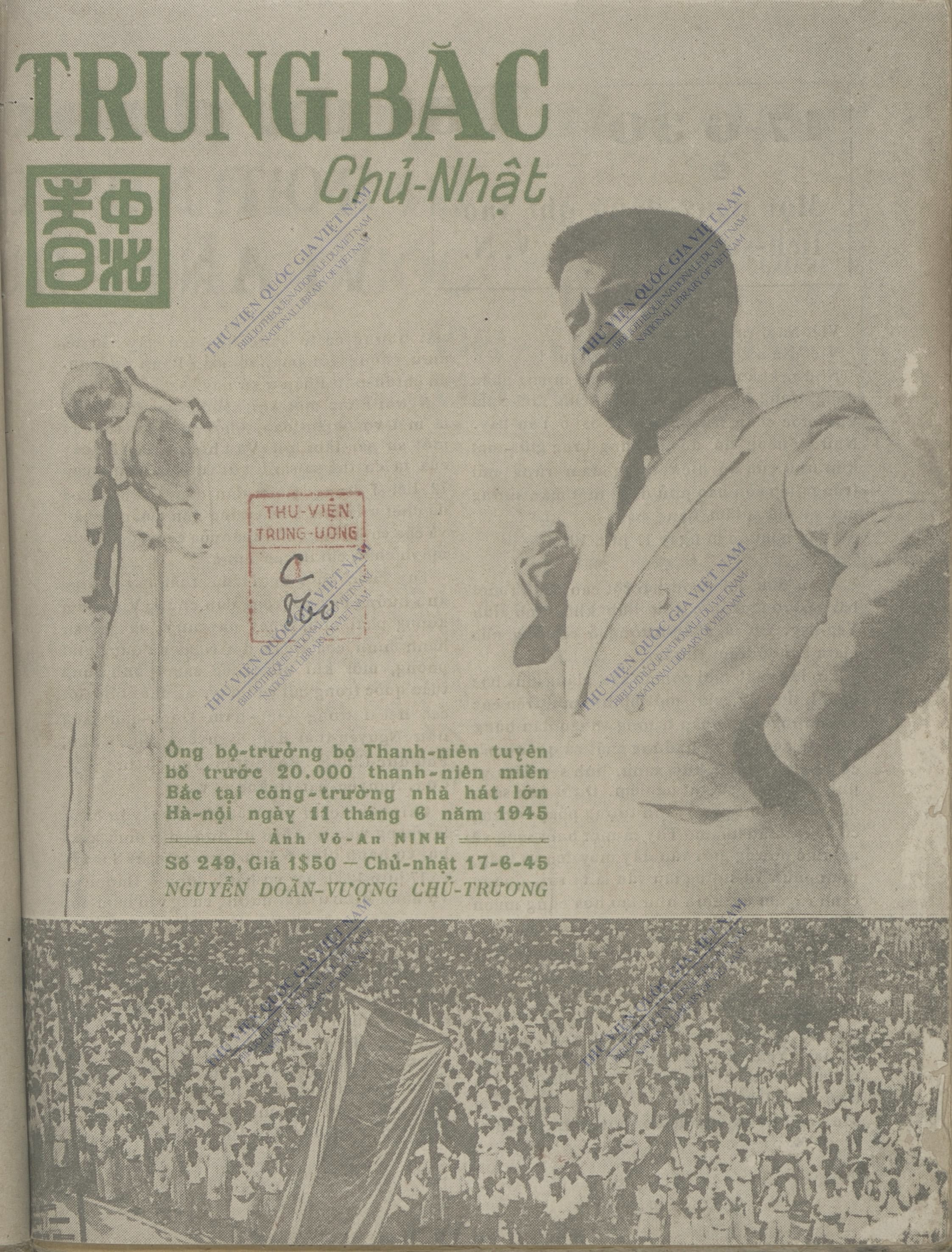
The square in front of the Hanoi Opera House on 11 June 1945, Trung Bắc Chủ nhật, issue no. 249

== See also ==
- Quẻ Ly flag
- Flag of the Republic of Vietnam
