= Bruno Saul =

Estonian politician (1932–2022)

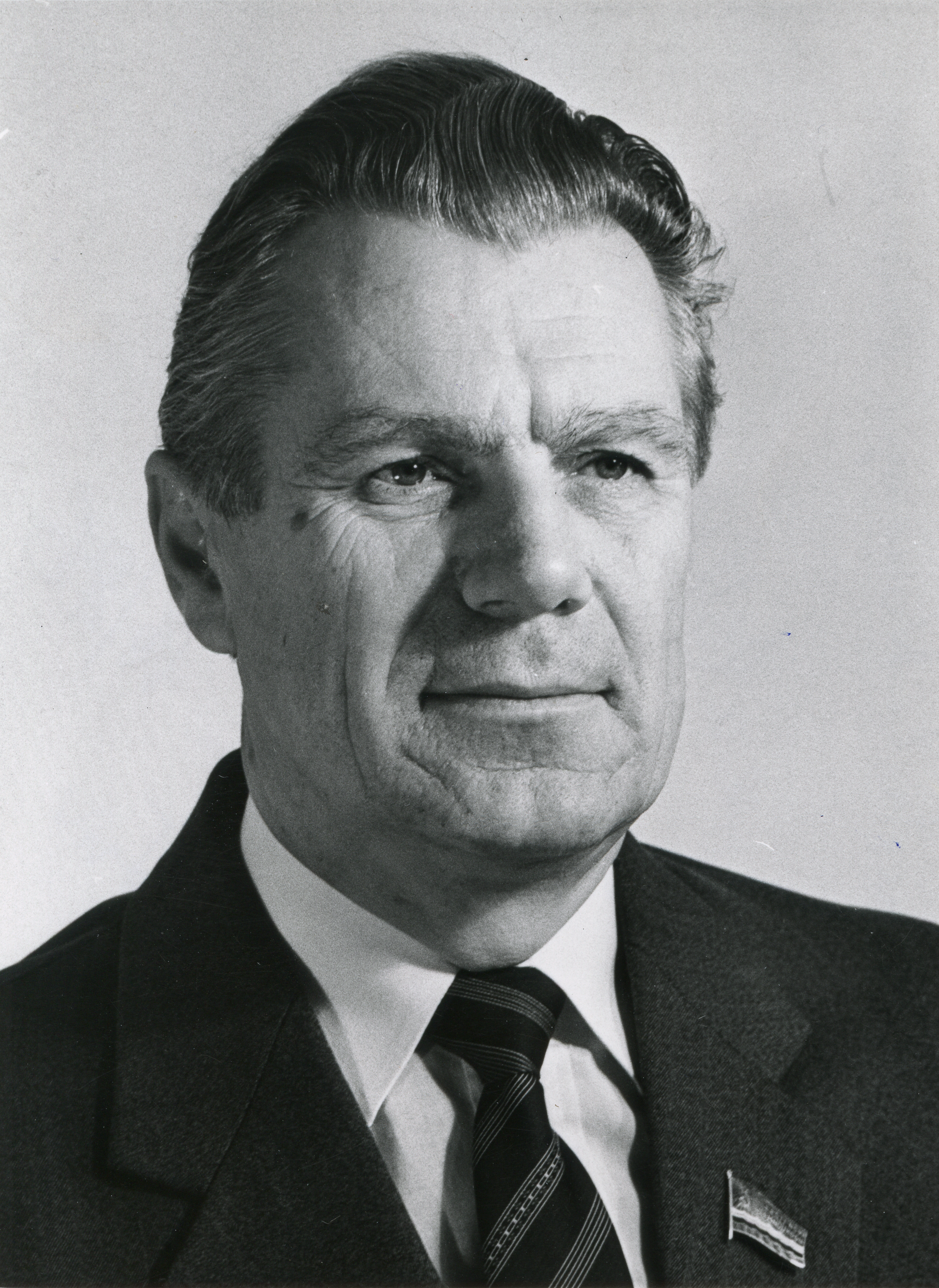
- Saul in c. 1984–1988

Chairman of the Council of Ministers of the Estonian SSR
- In office 18 January 1984 – 7 December 1988
- Preceded by: Valter Klauson
- Succeeded by: Indrek Toome

Personal details
- Born: 8 January 1932 Narva, Estonia
- Died: 3 March 2022 (aged 90)
- Party: Communist Party of Estonia (1960–1990)

Bruno Eduardovich Saul (8 January 1932 – 3 March 2022) was an Estonian politician. He was the Chairman of the Council of Ministers of the Estonian Soviet Socialist Republic, a constituency of the Soviet Union, from 1984 to 1988.

== Early life ==
Bruno Saul was born in Narva, Estonia, on 8 January 1932. He studied engineering at the Leningrad Electrotechnical Institute, where he graduated in 1956.

== Political career ==
Saul joined the Communist Party of Estonia in 1960, and he became the head of the ESSR's Radio Center in 1961. He left the Radio Center in 1964 to work as an engineer at the ESSR Ministry of Communications. He was promoted to Deputy Minister of Communications in 1996. He then became the Minister of Communications in 1969. He attended the Higher Party School while in office, graduating in 1973. His tenure as Minister of Communications ended in 1975, at which time he joined the Supreme Soviet of the ESSR and became first Deputy Chairman of the Council of Ministers of the ESSR. Saul received a candidate degree in economics in 1977, and he served as deputy chairman until 1983. He became Industrial Secretary of the ECB CC on 9 April 1983, serving here until 18 January 1984. He then became the Chairman of the Council of Ministers of the ESSR in 1984, making him Prime Minister of the ESSR, and he joined the Supreme Soviet of the Soviet Union.

The Isemajandava Eesti proposal was formed in September 1987 during the Singing Revolution, proposing that the ESSR be economically independent from the Soviet Union. Saul's government rejected it on 16 November 1987, but it was supported by the Communist Party of Estonia. Vaino Väljas took charge of the Communist Party of Estonia as the independence movement grew, and Saul was removed from his leadership position on 7 December 1988 along with other reactionary members of the party. Indrek Toome was chosen to replace him.

== Later life ==
After his premiership ended, Saul worked as a trade representative of the Soviet Union to East Germany from 1988 to 1990. He left the Communist Party that year, resigning from the Supreme Soviets of the ESSR and the Soviet Union. He was Vice President of the Tartu Kommertspank from 1991 to 1992.

Saul entered business and academia after retiring from politics in 1992. He taught at the International University of Social Sciences LEX from 1995 to 1999 and the Euroacademy from 1998 to 2002. He continued supervising dissertations at the Euroacademy from 2003 to 2011. Saul died on 3 March 2022.
