= Imperial Order of the Dragon of Annam =

Imperial Order of the Dragon of Annam Ordre Impérial du Dragon d'Annam Ordre du Dragon Vert Đại Nam Long Tinh Nam Việt Long bội tinh
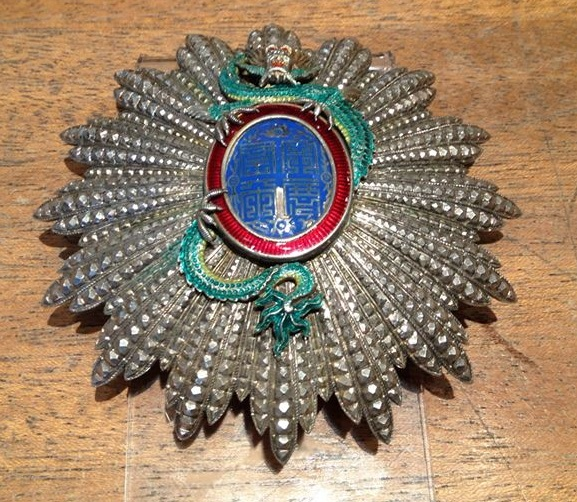
- Star of the Imperial Order, 2nd class
- Type: Order of Merit
- Awarded for: Useful services to the state or the Emperor
- Description: The badge was an eight pointed star charged with a central medallion of blue bearing the legend "Đồng Khánh hoàng đế" ('Emperor Đồng Khánh'); in Chinese (Seal script) with four radiant suns surrounded by a red band, all suspended from an imperial crown surmounted by a green dragon. The star for Grand Officers and Grand Cross holders was charged with a green dragon holdling the same blue medallion as featured on the badge. There were two ribbons, red with gold border stripes for awards by the Emperor, and green with gold border stripes for President's version.
- Presented by: Jointly by the President of France and Emperor of Annam/Vietnam
- Eligibility: Vietnamese, French and foreign nationals
- Status: Obsolete from 1945
- Established: 14 March 1886
- First award: 1886
- Ribbon bar for 5th class

Precedence
- Next (higher): None
- Equivalent: Royal Order of Cambodia
- Next (lower): Order of the Golden Gong

The Imperial Order of the Dragon of Annam ( Vietnamese: Đại Nam Long Tinh / 大南龍星, Nam Việt Long bội tinh / 南越龍佩星, Nam-Long bội-tinh / 南龍佩星; French: Ordre impérial du Dragon d'Annam, Ordre du Dragon Vert) was created in 1886 in the city of Huế, by Emperor Đồng Khánh of the Imperial House of Annam, upon the "recommendation" of the President of France as a jointly awarded French colonial order. The Order was designed as a reward for services to the state, the French colonial government, or the emperor.

Awarded individuals are incorporated into the Đại Nam Long Tinh Viện (chữ Hán: 大南龍星院), similar to the French National Order of the Legion of Honour.

== Classes and insignia ==
In its classes and insignia, the Order was modelled on the French National Order of the Legion of Honour and the other French colonial orders. The star is a composition of asymmetrical arms of rays, its central disc is in blue enamel writing golden word 同慶皇帝 (Đồng Khánh hoàng đế, "Emporer Đồng Khánh") in Seal script, surrounding by gold-red-gold ring, and is climbed by a green dragon.

The order have five classes (hạng) all are cognate with the Grand Cross, Grand Officer, Commander, Officer and Knight of the Legion of Honour, each class have specific term for civilian and military recipients.

- 1st class: Khôi kỳ long tinh (魁奇龍星, for civilian), Trác dị long tinh (卓異龍星, for military)
- 2nd class: Chương hiền long tinh (彰賢龍星, for civilian), Thù huân long tinh (殊勳龍星, for military)
- 3rd class: Biểu đức long tinh (表德龍星, for civilian), Sinh năng long tinh (旌能龍星, for military)
- 4th class: Minh nghĩa long tinh (明義龍星, for civilian), Tưởng trung long tinh (獎忠龍星, for military)
- 5th class: Gia thiện long tinh (嘉善龍星, for civilian), Khuyến công long tinh (勸功龍星, for military)

== Reconstitution ==
On 30 October 2002, the Imperial Order of the Dragon of Annam was re-established by Prince Bửu Chánh as first provisional Grandmaster under the protection of the Imperial Nguyễn dynasty of Vietnam.

== Gallery ==
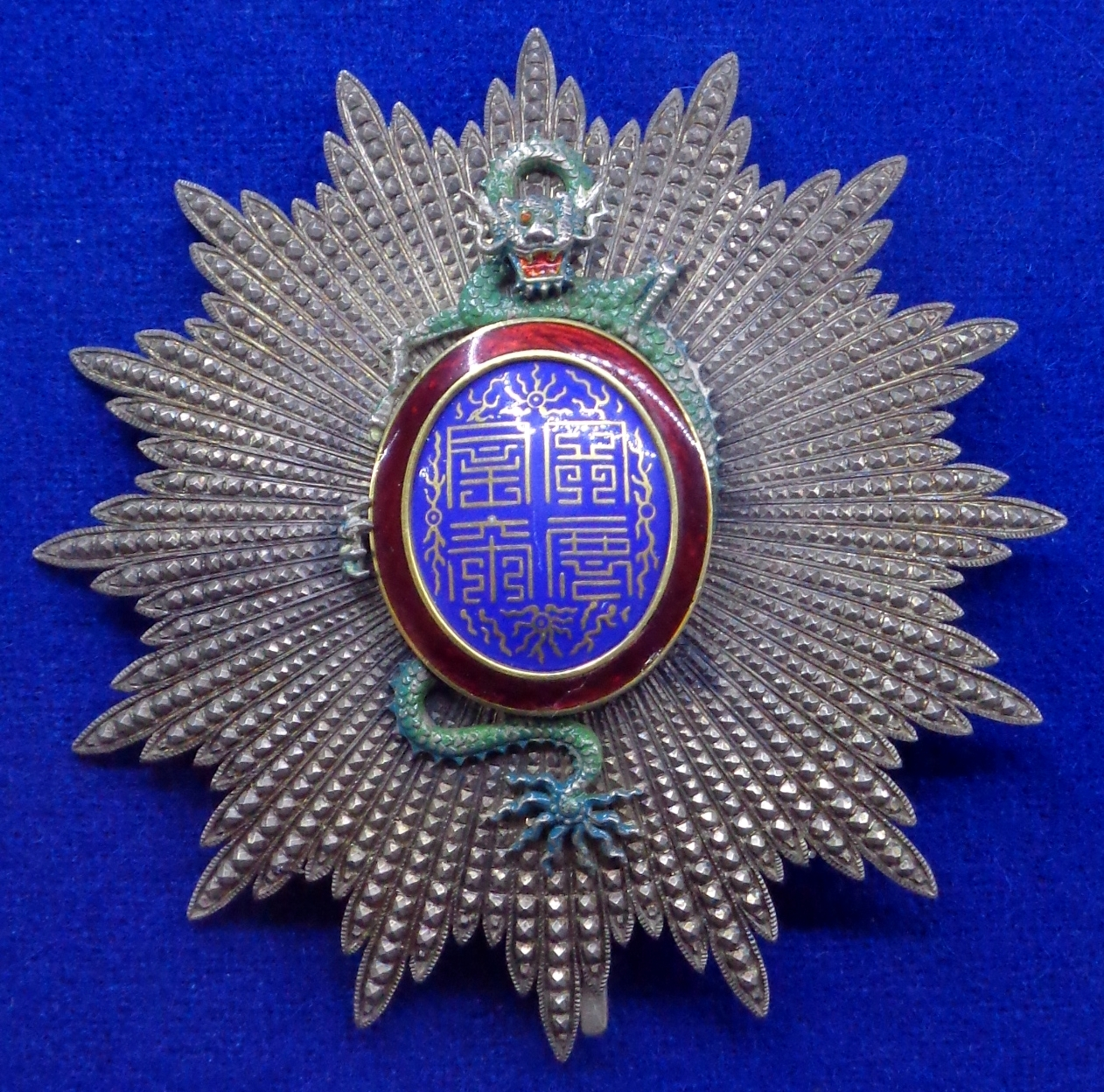
A grand cross star of the Imperial Order of the Dragon of Annam in the Tallinn Museum of Orders of Knighthood, Tallinn.

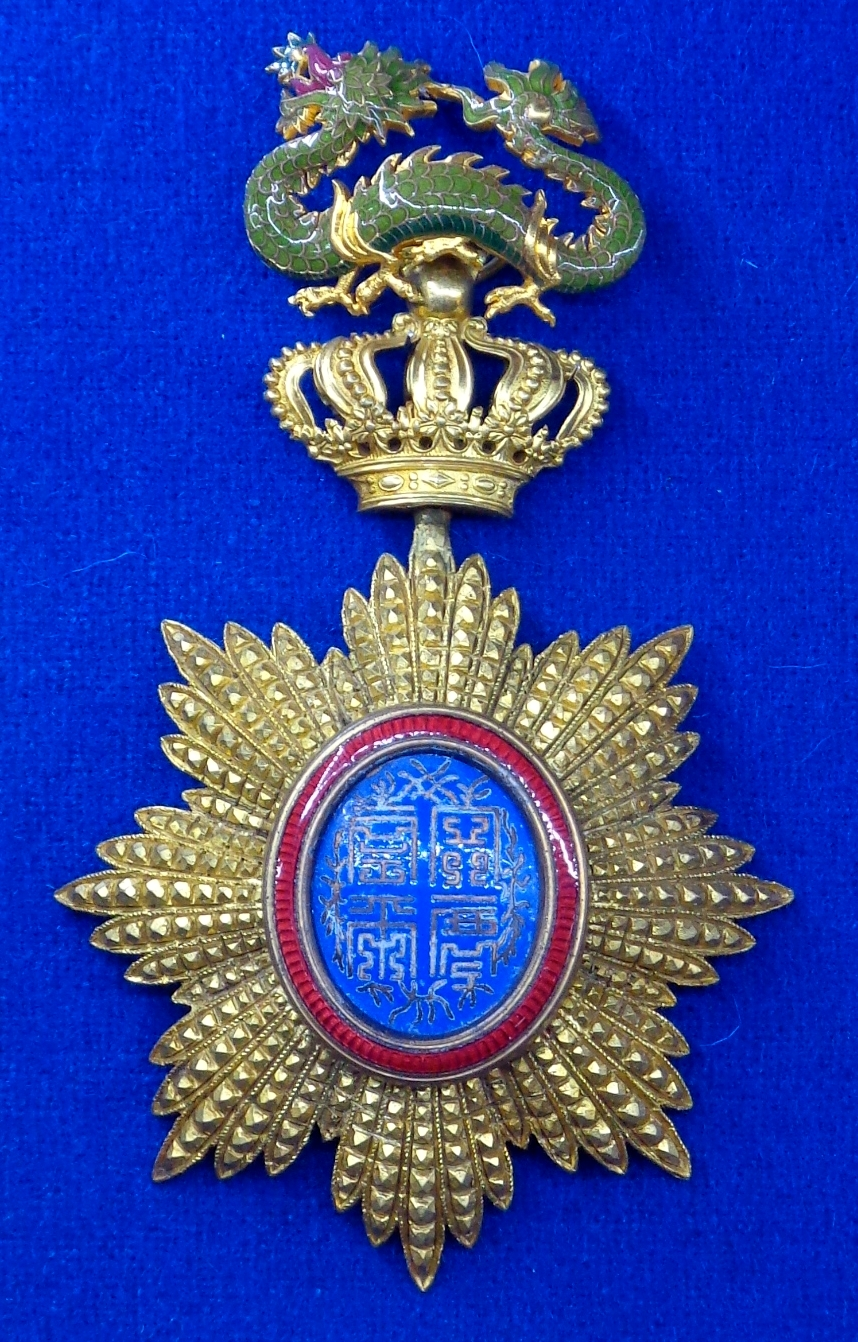
A grand cross star badge of the Imperial Order of the Dragon of Annam in the Tallinn Museum of Orders of Knighthood, Tallinn.

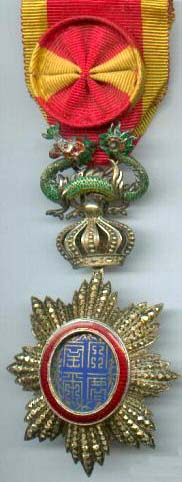
A star badge of the Imperial Order of the Dragon of Annam with the red riband with gold border.

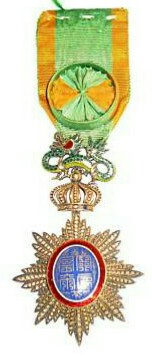
A star badge of the Imperial Order of the Dragon of Annam with the green riband with gold border, used for awarding by French Government.

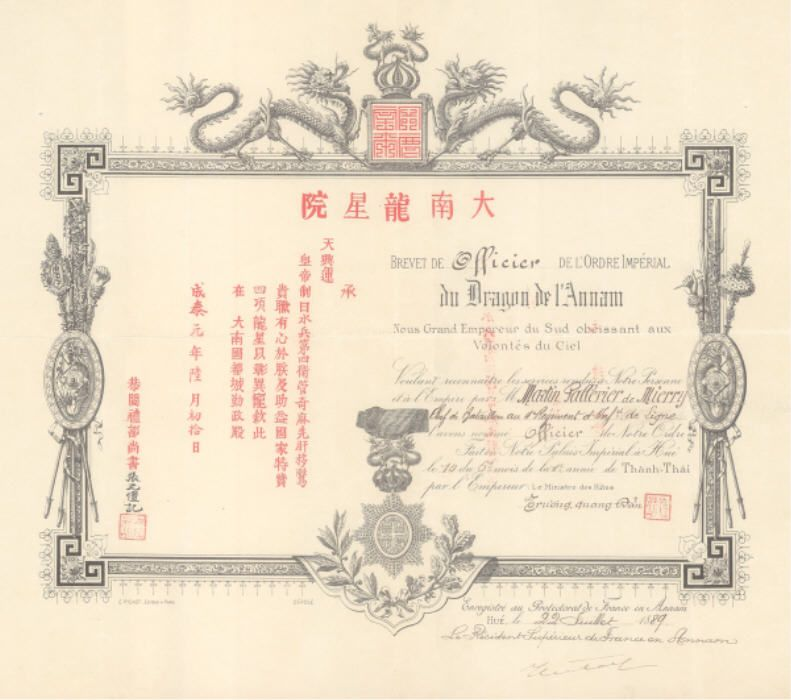
A certificate issued to a recipient of the Imperial Order of the Dragon of Annam in 1889 (1st year of Thành Thái). 4th class.

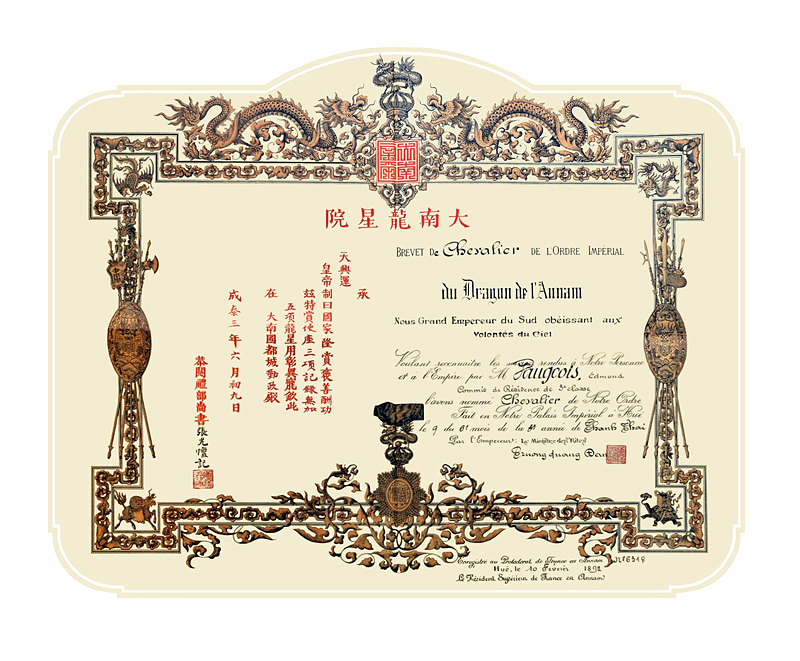
A certificate issued to a recipient of the Imperial Order of the Dragon of Annam in 1892 (3rd year of Thành Thái). 5th class.

== See also ==
- Order of the Golden Gong
- National Order of Vietnam
- Gold Star Order
