= List of chairmen of the Council of Ministers of the Estonian Soviet Socialist Republic =

The chairman of the Council of Ministers of the Estonian Soviet Socialist Republic was the second-highest official in the Estonian Soviet Socialist Republic, which was in turn a part of the Soviet Union.

Below is a list of office-holders:

Name	Entered office	Left office
Johannes Lauristin (1899–1941)	August 25, 1940	August 28, 1941
Vacant (August 28, 1941 – June 17, 1942)
Oskar Sepre (acting) (1900–1965)	June 17, 1942	September 28, 1944
Arnold Veimer (1903–1977)	September 28, 1944	March 29, 1951
Aleksei Müürisepp (1902–1970)	March 29, 1951	October 12, 1961
Valter Klauson (1914–1988)	October 12, 1961	January 18, 1984
Bruno Saul (1932–2022)	January 18, 1984	November 16, 1988
Indrek Toome (1943–2023)	November 16, 1988	April 3, 1990

== See also ==
- Prime Minister of Estonia
- List of chairmen of the Presidium of the Supreme Soviet of the Estonian Soviet Socialist Republic
