= Leninist Young Communist League of Estonia =

Youth division of Estonian Communist Party

Leninist Young Communist League of Estonia ELKNÜ ЛКСМЭ Estonian: Eestimaa Leninlik Kommunistlik Noorsooühing Russian: Ленинский коммунистический союз молодежи Эстонии
- Founded: 1940
- Preceded by: Young Communist League of Estonia
- Dissolved: 1991
- Headquarters: Tallinn, Estonian Soviet Socialist Republic
- Membership: 162,202 (1980)
- Ideology: Communism; Marxism–Leninism
- Mother party: Communist Party of the Soviet Union
- State party: Communist Party of Estonia
- National affiliation: Komsomol (until 1989)
- International affiliation: World Federation of Democratic Youth
- Newspaper: Noorte Hääl

The Leninist Young Communist League of Estonia (Estonian: Eestimaa Leninlik Kommunistlik Noorsooühing, ELKNÜ) was a political youth organization that served as the Estonian branch of Komsomol and as the official youth organ of the Estonian Communist Party (EKP). It existed from 1940 until the dissolution of the EKP in 1991.

== History ==
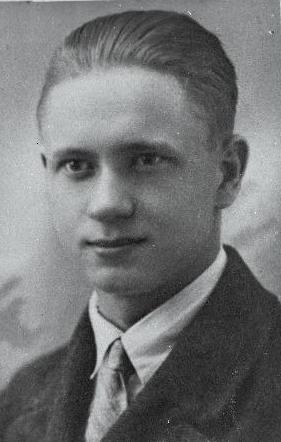
Oskar Cher, First Secretary of the Central Committee of the ELKNÜ, 1940–41

Formed in the wake of the Soviet occupation of Estonia in 1940, the ELKNÜ acted as the successor to the clandestine Young Communist League of Estonia, which operated during the interbellum. As in other branches of the Komsomol, the ELKNÜ facilitated the provision of ideological instruction, leisure activities, volunteer work, sporting, technical training, theatre and drama clubs, and other activities to engage youth and develop politically and socially dedicated future party members. In preparation for the sailing program at the 1980 Summer Olympics, the ELKNÜ assisted in the construction of olympic facilities in Tallinn. Throughout its existence, ELKNÜ youth volunteers engaged in projects across the Soviet Union including the Virgin Lands campaign and the construction of the Baikal–Amur Mainline. By 1980, the ELKNÜ had 162,202 members.

Faced with declining membership in the wake of the push for independence in the late 1980s (including a mass resignation of members in 1987), the ELKNÜ elected to withdraw itself from the Soviet Komsomol and pursue a new programme congruent with an independent Estonia in November 1989. It reconstituted itself after three months as an organisation unaffiliated with the union-wide Komsomol, though membership dropped to 30,000 by 1990. Nevertheless, the decision of the EKP and ELKNÜ to stand against Moscow and support the move for independence enabled Estonian communists and socialists to maintain some popularity among the population, which has played a role in the post-independence Estonian political sphere.

The official newspaper of the organization, published by the Central Committee (Keskkomitee) of the ELKNÜ, was Noorte Hääl.

First Secretaries of the ELKNÜ Keskkomitee
Name	Term
Erich Tarkpea	1940–1941
Oskar Cher	1941–1942
Juliana Telman	1943–1944
Arnold Meri	1945–1949
Boris Tolbast	1949–1955
Vaino Väljas	1955–1961
Jaan Lüllemets	1961–1964
Taimo Suuresaar	1964–1966
Rein Pollimann	1966–1969
Aare Purga	1969–1972
Indrek Toome	1972–1978
Donald Visnapuu	1978–1984
Arno Almann	1984–1988
