= List of members of the Supreme Soviet of the Estonian Soviet Socialist Republic, 1963–1967 =

This is a list of members of the sixth legislature of the Supreme Soviet of the Estonian Soviet Socialist Republic which was the Estonian Soviet Socialist Republic's legislative chamber between 1940 and 1941, and between 1944 and 1992. The session ran from 17 March 1963 to 19 March 1967, and followed the 1963 Estonian Supreme Soviet election in which only Bloc of Communists and Non-Party Candidates was the only party able to contest the elections.

== List of members ==
Source: Jaan Toomla, Valitud ja Valitsenud: Eesti parlamentaarsete ja muude esinduskogude ning valitsuste isikkoosseis aastail 1917–1999 (National Library of Estonia, 1999), pp. 96–98.

| Name | Party | Notes |
|---|---|---|
| Agu Aarna | NLKP | |
| Marie Aasma | | |
| Endel Aava | | |
| Erich Aava | NLKP | |
| Zinaida Alasoo | | |
| Hendrik Allik | NLKP | |
| Valter Ani | NLKP | |
| Aleksander Ansberg | NLKP | |
| Nikolai Antonov | NLKP | |
| Elviine Arras | | |
| Mäns Aru | NLKP | |
| Anna Baiko (Sergomets) | NLKP | |
| Arseni Blum | NLKP | |
| Pavel Bogovski | NLKP | |
| Andrei Bolibruhh | NLKP | |
| Nikolai Borissov | | |
| Mihhail Borovikov | NLKP | |
| Ferdinand Eisen | NLKP | |
| Gustav Ernesaks | | |
| Harald Faelman | NLKP | |
| Arnold Green | NLKP | |
| Ivan Grizov | NLKP | |
| Eevi Hallik | | |
| Ilme Haugas (Meister) | NLKP | |
| Aime Heile | | |
| Aino Ilmoja | | |
| Harald Ilves | NLKP | |
| Kuuno Int | NLKP | |
| Kaarel Ird | NLKP | |
| Endel-Johannes Jaanimägi | NLKP | |
| Hilda Jalakas | | |
| Meta Jangolenko (Vannas) | NLKP | |
| Konstantin Jegonjan | NLKP | |
| Endla Johanson (Koort) | | |
| Karin Juhansoo | NLKP | |
| Anna Juškina | NLKP | |
| Helve Järva | NLKP | |
| Alfred Kadastik | NLKP | |
| Valeria Kaljo | NLKP | |
| Erna Kaljuste (Moor) | NLKP | |
| Aleksandr Kazatšok | NLKP | |
| Salme Kesküla | NLKP | |
| Valter Klauson (Klaussen) | NLKP | |
| Minna Klement | NLKP | |
| Galina Konstantinova | | |
| Vete Koroleva | NLKP | |
| Boris Kortšemkin | NLKP | |
| Kalju Kosk | | |
| Heino Kostabi | -, NLKP | |
| Anatoli Kotov | NLKP | |
| Elmar Krabi | | |
| Dimitri Kromonov | | |
| Eduard Kruusmägi | NLKP | |
| Eduard Kubjas | NLKP | |
| Mihail Kukli | NLKP | |
| Evi Kulbas | | |
| Endla Kuldmets | | |
| Dimitri Kuzmin | NLKP | |
| Boriss Kuznetsov | NLKP | |
| Jossif Kuznetsov | NLKP | |
| Viola Kõiv | | |
| Ivan Käbin | NLKP | |
| Vladimir Käo | NLKP | |
| Mare Kärner | | |
| Arvid Kääramees | NLKP | |
| Vambola Laanmäe | | |
| Aino Laasing | | |
| Voldemar Laos | NLKP | |
| Herbert Laugas | | |
| Jaan-Õilu Laurenti | | |
| Albert Laus | NLKP | |
| Enn Lehepuu | NLKP | |
| Arseni Leonov | NLKP | |
| Feliks Liivik | NLKP | |
| Martin Linnas | NLKP | |
| Herta Luks | | |
| Vella Lõhmus | -, NLKP | |
| Jaan Lüllemets | NLKP | |
| Vladimir Makarov | NLKP | |
| Vladimir Meister | NLKP | Elected 13.10.1963 |
| Otto Merimaa | NLKP | |
| Erna Mihkelson | | |
| Aleksei Mogilevtsev | NLKP | |
| Ilme Muru | | |
| Amanda Mägi | | |
| Harald Männik | NLKP | |
| Leida Männimägi | | |
| Heili Müüripeal | | |
| Aleksei Müürisepp | NLKP | |
| Paul Neerot | NLKP | |
| Georgi Nellis | NLKP | |
| Raul Nikkolo | | |
| Elia Nurmik | | |
| Oskar Oja | NLKP | |
| Evald Okas | | |
| Heldi Pajula | | |
| Elvi Pajuleht | | |
| Eduard Pelapson | | |
| Heimar Peremees | NLKP | |
| Evgeni Petuhhov | NLKP | |
| Helmut Piip | NLKP | |
| Elise Pilbas | | |
| Konstantin Ploom | NLKP | |
| August Pork | NLKP | |
| Aleksander Preemet | NLKP | |
| Aliise Prei | | |
| Aili Prii | | |
| Endel Priivits | | |
| Lembit Pukk | | |
| Leida Põder | | |
| Harri Raag | NLKP | |
| Linda Raidma (Reimann) | | |
| Vello Ranne | NLKP | |
| Aino Raska | | |
| Ernst Raudam | | |
| Valter Raudsalu | NLKP | |
| Helmi Rets | | |
| Viktor Roos | | |
| Hildegard Roosaar | NLKP | |
| Eliise Roosileht | | |
| Hilda Rosin | | |
| Pjotr Rovnõi | NLKP | |
| Jüri Räim | NLKP | |
| Edith Räni | NLKP | |
| Naima Saar | NLKP | |
| August Saaremägi | NLKP | |
| Maie Sakkarias | | |
| Johannes Sarapuu | | |
| Vaike Sastok | | |
| Johannes Semper | NLKP | |
| Richard Sibul | NLKP | |
| Elmar Siisel | NLKP | |
| Akim Sinetski | NLKP | |
| Leida Sipria | NLKP | |
| Heino Sisask | NLKP | |
| Aleksei Solovjev | NLKP | |
| Tomas Sooaluste | NLKP | |
| Hans Sõrga | | |
| Boriss Suhhatšov | NLKP | |
| Raivo Suurmaa | | |
| Lembit Suvi | | |
| Valter Sääsk | NLKP | |
| Mihhail Sturm | NLKP | |
| Olav Zereen | | |
| Vilma Talumäe | | |
| Helgi-Linda Tamberg | | |
| Arnold Tammiste | NLKP | |
| Mihkel Tapp | NLKP | |
| Helmi Teedla | NLKP | |
| Uno Teemägi | NLKP | |
| Valve Tibar | | |
| Anatoli Tihane | NLKP | Died in office on 26.01.1967 |
| Voldemar Tint | | |
| Silvia-Rutt Tohv | | |
| Boris Tolbast | NLKP | |
| Hilja Tombu (Puusild) | NLKP | |
| Marta Treial | | |
| Stepan Tšernikov | NLKP | |
| Natalia Tšernõšova | NLKP | |
| Gustav Tõnspoeg | NLKP | |
| Jaan Tõnuvere | NLKP | |
| Fjodor Ušanjov | NLKP | |
| Artur Vader | NLKP | |
| Mart Vahnovere | NLKP | |
| Lembit Vaik | NLKP | |
| Karl Vaino | NLKP | |
| Berta Valberg | | |
| Gori Valgur | NLKP | |
| Aleksander Valkonen | NLKP | |
| Elvi Vankov | NLKP | |
| Albert Vendelin | NLKP | |
| Silvi Vene | NLKP | |
| Rudolf Vester | NLKP | Died in office on 05.08.1963 |
| Edgar Vildakas | | |
| Eduard Viipsi | NLKP | |
| Raimund Vitsmaa | NLKP | |
| Juri Vladõtšin | NLKP | |
| Feliks Voolens | NLKP | Died in office on 26.04.1966 |
| Vaino Väljas | NLKP | |
