= 1963 Soviet Union regional elections =

Legislative election in the Soviet Union

- March 1963

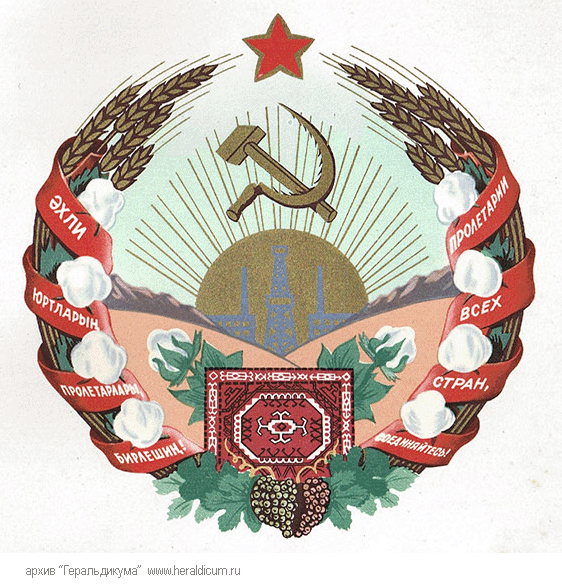
	First party	Second party	Third party
Party	AzKP(b)	KPB(b)	EKP
Seats won	325 / 325	422 / 422	178 / 178
	Fourth party	Fifth party	Sixth party
Party	CNG(b)	KPKaz(b)	LK(b)P
Seats won	400 / 400	473 / 473	310 / 310
	Seventh party	Eighth party	Ninth party
Party	CPL	CPSU	CPT
Seats won	288 / 288	884 / 884	282 / 282

In March 1963, the sixth republican elections were held in the Union of Soviet Socialist Republics, electing the Supreme Soviet of the Union Republics of the USSR.

Background The elections took place against the backdrop of the ongoing Khrushchev Thaw, the Cuban Missile Crisis, as well as the Sino-Soviet split, and ongoing de-Stalinization.

1963 Soviet Union regional elections
Union Republic	Election date	Election name	Results
AzSSR		1963 Azerbaijani Supreme Soviet election	325 / 325
ArSSR		1963 Armenian Supreme Soviet election	
BSSR		1963 Byelorussian Supreme Soviet election	422 / 422
ESSR	March 1963	1963 Estonian Supreme Soviet election	178 / 178
GSSR		1963 Georgian Supreme Soviet election	400 / 400
Kazakh SSR	March 1963	1963 Kazakh Supreme Soviet election	473 / 473
borderless Kirghiz SSR	March 1963	1963 Kirghiz Supreme Soviet election	
borderless Latvian SSR		1963 Latvian Supreme Soviet election	310 / 310
borderless Lithuanian SSR	March 1963	1963 Lithuanian Supreme Soviet election	288 / 288
borderless Moldavian SSR		1963 Moldavian Supreme Soviet election	
RSFSR	March 1963	1963 Russian Supreme Soviet election	884 / 884
Tajik SSR		1963 Tajik Supreme Soviet election	
Turkmen SSR		1963 Turkmen Supreme Soviet election	282 / 282
Uzbek SSR		1963 Uzbek Supreme Soviet election	
UkSSR		1963 Ukrainian Supreme Soviet election	469 / 469
