= Order of the Tallinn Coat of Arms =

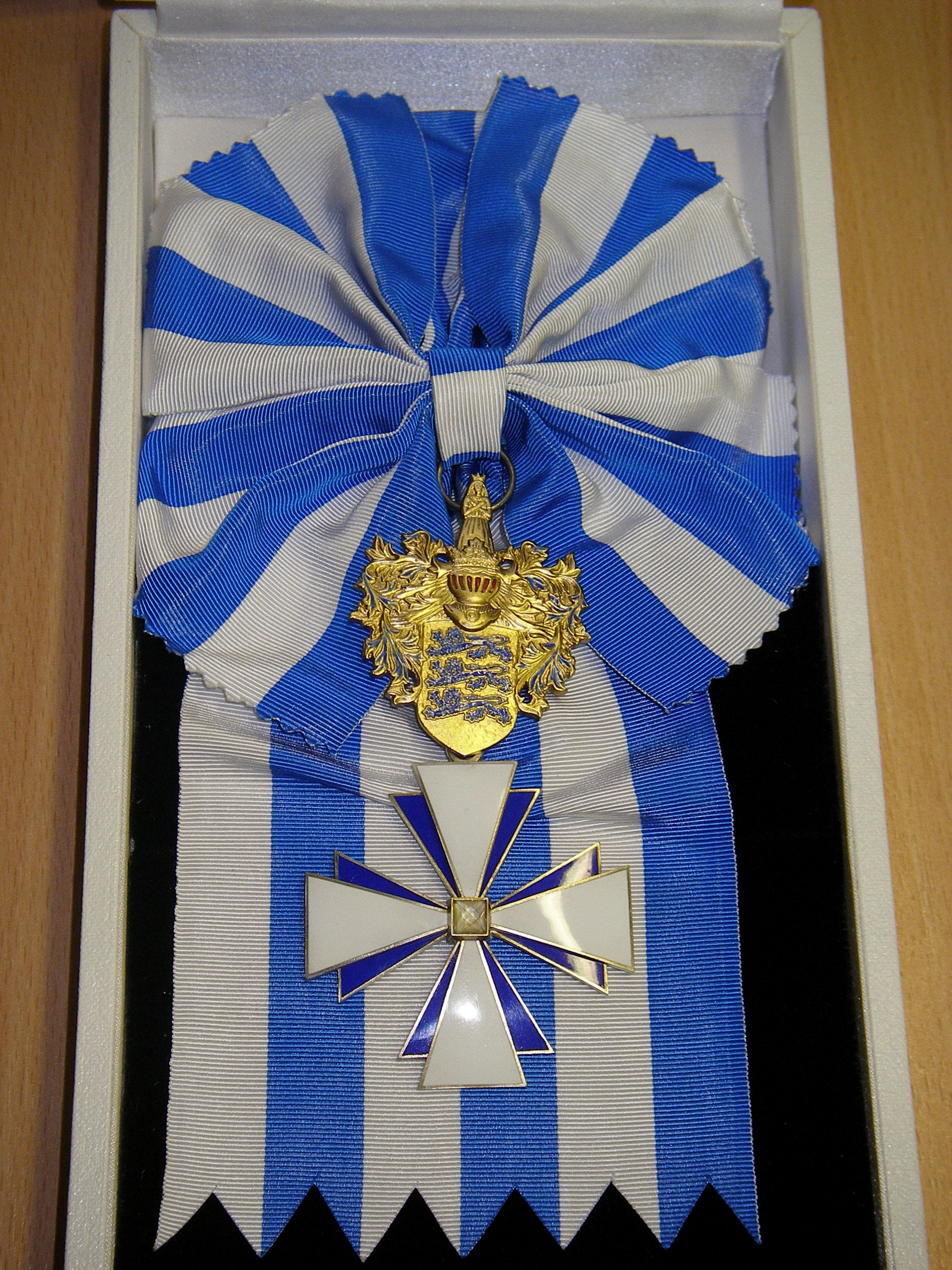
Tallinn Coat of Arms

The Order of the Tallinn Coat of Arms (Estonian: Tallinna vapimärk) is an award of the City of Tallinn, Estonia, which is given to natural persons as a special tribute from the city. The recipients of the Tallinn Coat of Arms are members of the Tallinn Honorary Citizens' Association. The coat of arms of Tallinn has been awarded since 1997. It was designed by Estonian heraldist and former chairman of the Estonian Heritage Society Priit Herodes.

== Description ==
The coat of arms consists of two crosses placed one above the other. The lower cross is blue, the upper, longer and narrower cross is white and in its center is a white gemstone (a substitute for a diamond). Above the cross is the full coat of arms of Tallinn. The badge number and the year of award are engraved on the back of the badge. The badge is made of silver, finished with gold and hot-stamping.

== Awarding of a decoration ==
The coat of arms may be awarded to Estonian citizens or foreigners. Foreigners include both foreign citizens and stateless persons. The awarding of the coat of arms is decided by the city council. The coat of arms is usually presented to the recipient by the mayor at Tallinn Town Hall.

== Recipients of the Tallinn Coat of Arms ==
Year	Recipient(s)
1997	Neeme Lake
1998	Jaan Kross
1999	Special Class
2000	Veljo Tormis
2002	Olev Subbi
2003	Dmitry Bruns
2004	Heinz Valk
2005	Olga Kistler-Ritso
2006	Lennart Meri, Mati Hint
2007	Ita Ever, Jüri Kuuskemaa, Edgar Savisaar
2008	Urmas Ott
2009	Arnold Rüütel, Jüri Uppin
2010	Ellen Niit, Eino Baskin
2011	Arvo Pärt
2012	Toomas Vitsut
2013	Lauri Leesi
2014	Mati Kaal
2015	Kuno Areng, Merike Martinson
2016	Harri Lumi, Raimo Pullat
2017	Elmo Nüganen, Jaan Tammsalu
2018	Tarmo Soomere, Tiina Mägi
2019	Boris Dubovik, Alexei Turovsky
2021	Vaino Väljas
2022	Leelo Tungal, Volodymyr Zelenskyy, Lilia Laul-Goncharenko
2023	Tõnu Kaljuste
2024	Raine Karp
2025	David Hinrikus
2026	Anne Veski

== See also ==
- Tallinn Museum of Orders of Knighthood
- Orders, decorations, and medals of Estonia
