= Vietnamese nobility =

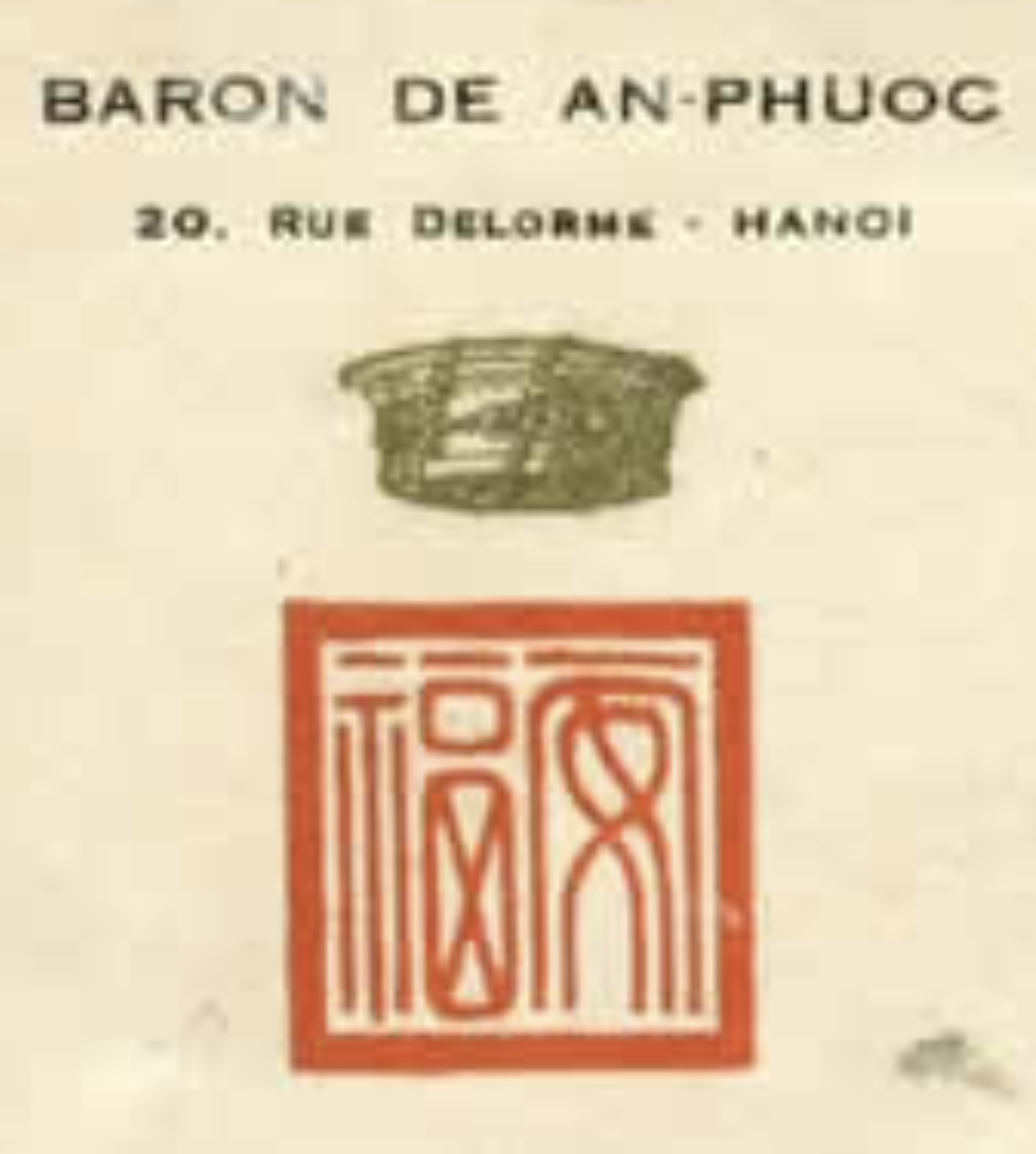
The symbol of the Baron of An-Phước (安福男) in Hanoi, Tonkin showing a Traditional Chinese seal with a crown symbolising the Ancien Régime French rank of "baron".

During Vietnam's monarchial period, the Vietnamese nobility (Quý Tộc, 貴族) were classified into eleven ranks (tước vị), with names similar to their Chinese equivalent. These are listed here from the highest to the lowest, along with their equivalent European titles.

== Terminology ==
=== Vua ===
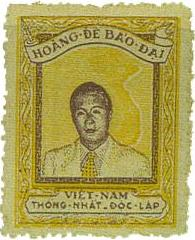
A postage stamp of the Empire of Vietnam (the Nguyễn dynasty under Japanese rule) using the term "Hoàng-Đế Bảo-Đại".

Sovereign rulers (both Emperors and Kings) in general are referred to in Vietnamese as Vua (𤤰). This term, which can also be interpreted as "Patron", has no equivalent in Chinese languages, but comes from the indigenous Vietnamese vernacular and therefore had to be written in chữ Nôm when used in court documents (which were typically written in chữ Hán, i.e. Văn ngôn). The general Vietnamese term for "ruler" was vua (𪼀). There is no Chinese character for this term and it only exists in its written form as a chữ Nôm character. The word vua originates from Proto-Vietic and means "father; chief; man". Vua contains connotations of rulership as well as familial kinship, combining the meaning of the Chinese originated word for "king" (vương) with "pater familias" (bó). Some emperors such as Lê Lợi (1428–1433) and Lê Thánh Tông (1460–1497) preferred being called vua while they were still living. During the Lê dynasty (1428–1789), the Chinese style title for "emperor" (hoàng đế) was mostly used during the ceremony in which the posthumous imperial name was bestowed upon the deceased emperor. As a vua, the Viet ruler was expected to be more hands on with their governance than their Chinese counterpart, and Viet peasants were more inclined to blame him directly for their misfortunes than in China. However the role of vua as a more intimate and native term has been questioned by Liam C. Kelley, who suggests that the difference between vương and vua may simply be the result of a modern political argument seeking to demonstrate that Vietnam was Southeast Asian rather than Chinese.

Vua was not used exclusively to the exclusion of other titles or applied only to Viet rulers. The Vietnamese monarchs usually carried the titles Vua and hoàng đế in parallel, with the former predominating among the general Vietnamese people and the latter at the imperial court. The Lao king Anouvong was referred to as both quoc vuong (Ch. guowang; king of a state) as well as vua. Nha vua, meaning "house head" or "monarch", was a common appellation for the Viet emperor and was also used for Anouvong. The king of Siam, Rama III, was called vua as well as Phat vuong (Buddha king).

The title used by Phùng Hưng (? – 789/791), 布蓋大王, may have been an early representation of vua. The latter two characters, 大王, mean "great king" in Chinese. However the first two characters bùgài (布蓋) do not mean anything coherent in Chinese. They have been translated into the Vietnamese expressions bo cái or vua cái. Bo cái dai vuong means "the Great King who is Father and Mother to his people" whereas vua cái dai vuong would simply be "great king" repeated twice, first in Vietnamese and then in Chinese. It was transcribed in the 15th-century Buddhist scripture Phật thuyết đại báo phụ mẫu ân trọng kinh as sībù (司布); in Middle Vietnamese (16th–17th centuries) as ꞗua or bua; becoming vua in Early Modern Vietnamese (18-19th centuries) such as recorded by Alexis-Marie de Rochon's A Voyage to Madagascar and the East Indies.

=== Hoàng đế ===
Hoàng đế (皇帝), meaning "emperor", is a Sino-Vietnamese title borrowed from Chinese (huangdi). Like Chinese emperors, Viet rulers used the title hoàng đế and thiên tử (天子), meaning "son of heaven". The poem Nam quốc sơn hà by Lý Thường Kiệt (1019–1105) contains a line calling the Viet ruler nam đế (emperor of the south).

Minh Mạng was thrice referred to as dai hoang de ("great emperor"). Minh Mạng referred to himself as dai nam quoc dai hoang de (great emperor of the great southern land) and insisted that he be addressed by foreign courts as Duc Hoang De (virtuous emperor) rather than vuong. This was likely due to his ideological leanings and predilection for Sinic culture. He also insisted that other countries use Chinese in official communications. These demands great offended other courts, especially Rama III of Rattanakosin.

The mother of the crown prince was called hoang thai hoa (Great Empress).

=== Vương ===
While Viet rulers were called vua or hoàng đế on most occasions, they were referred to as vương (王), a Sino-Vietnamese title for "king", in official communications with Chinese dynasties. Almost all Viet rulers adopted some sort of tributary relationship with the imperial dynasties of China. The relationship was symbolic and had no effect on Vietnam's management. However, the Viet ruler would style themselves as "king" (vương) when communicating with China's rulers while using hoàng đế to address their own subjects or other Southeast Asian rulers. Even during the Nguyễn dynasty when Viet rulers such as Minh Mạng referred to themselves as emperors especially towards other Southeast Asian courts, Viet embassies to China presented their ruler as the "king of the state of Vietnam". Internally, the Nguyễn saw their relationship with the Qing dynasty as that of equal countries.

In 1710, Nguyễn Phúc Chu was called Dai Viet quoc vuong (king of the great Viet state). In 1834, Minh Mạng called the Cambodian king phien vuong (barbarian king).

=== Chúa ===
Chúa (主), meaning prince, governor, lord, or warlord, was a title that was applied to the Trịnh lords and Nguyễn lords. The title Chúa, which is outside of the classical hierarchy of nobility, is considered to be higher than Công and lower than Vương.

=== Phật ===
Buddhism exerted influence on a number of Vietnamese royal titles, such as when the late 12th-century devout Buddhist king Lý Cao Tông (r. 1176–1210) demanded his courtiers to refer him as phật (Buddha). His great-grandfather and predecessor Lý Nhân Tông (r. 1072–1127), a great patronizer of the Buddhist sangha, in his stelae inscription erected in 1121, compared himself and his accomplishments with ancient rulers of the Indian subcontinent near the time of Gautama Buddha, particularly king Udayana and emperor Aśoka.

=== Cham titles ===
Cham rulers of the former kingdom of Champa in present-day Central and Southern Vietnam used many titles, mostly derived from Hindu Sanskrit titles. There were prefix titles, among them, Jaya and Śrī, which Śrī (His glorious, His Majesty) was used more commonly before each ruler's name, and sometimes Śrī and Jaya were combined into Śrī Jaya[monarch name]. Royal titles were used to indicate the power and prestige of rulers: raja-di-raja (king of kings), maharajadhiraja (great king of kings), arddharaja (vice king/junior king). After the fall of Vijaya Champa and the Simhavarmanid dynasty in 1471, all Sanskrit titles disappeared from Cham records, due to southern Panduranga rulers styled themselves as Po (native Cham title, which also means "King, His Majesty, Her Majesty"), and Islam gradually replaced Hinduism in post-1471 Champa.

Vietnamese	Chữ Hán	European equivalent	Remarks
Hoàng đế	皇帝	Emperor	see Chinese nobility
Quốc vương	國王	King	lit. "King of the State". In the historical context of Vietnam and Imperial China, Quốc vương was used to refer to the Emperor of Vietnam in its correspondences with the Chinese dynasties. This occurred due to Chinese suzerainty over Đai Viet leading to the concept of “Emperor at home, King abroad”.
Đại vương	大王	Prince	lit. "Great King". In the context of Vietnamese historical records this used to refer to the successor to the Emperor thus making it equivalent to a Prince in the Western feudal system.
Vương	王	Viceroy	lit. "King". Note: The distinction of Đại vương was used for the son of the Emperor in Đai Viet, Đại vương occupies the same equivalence òf a hereditary prince in European feudalism. The title Vương here was only ever used in historical sources to refer to those who wielded power in the name of the Emperor. The most prominent usage came with the Trịnh and Nguyễn lords under the Later Le dynasty.
Quốc công	國公		lit. "Duke of the State"
Quận công	郡公		lit. "Prefect Duke"
Công	公	Duke	
Hầu	侯	Marquis	
Bá	伯	Count	
Tử	子	Viscount	
Nam	男	Baron	
Vinh phong	榮封	Baronet	

== History ==
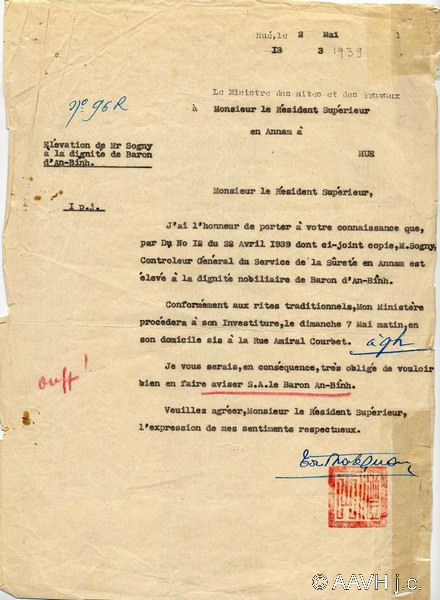
A letter from the Ministry of Rites and Labour to the Resident-Superior of Annam informing him that Léon Sogny will be given the noble title "Baron of An Bình".

The use of noble titles has existed in China since ancient times and the system of nobility used in Vietnam until 1945 dates back to the Zhou dynasty (nhà Chu). The system of nobility employed by the Later Lê dynasty and later were directly based on the Chinese system used during the Ming dynasty period, this system would remain to be used in Vietnam until 1945 (as the August Revolution overthrew the Nguyễn dynasty), but had actually ceased in China in 1911 due to the Xinhai Revolution.

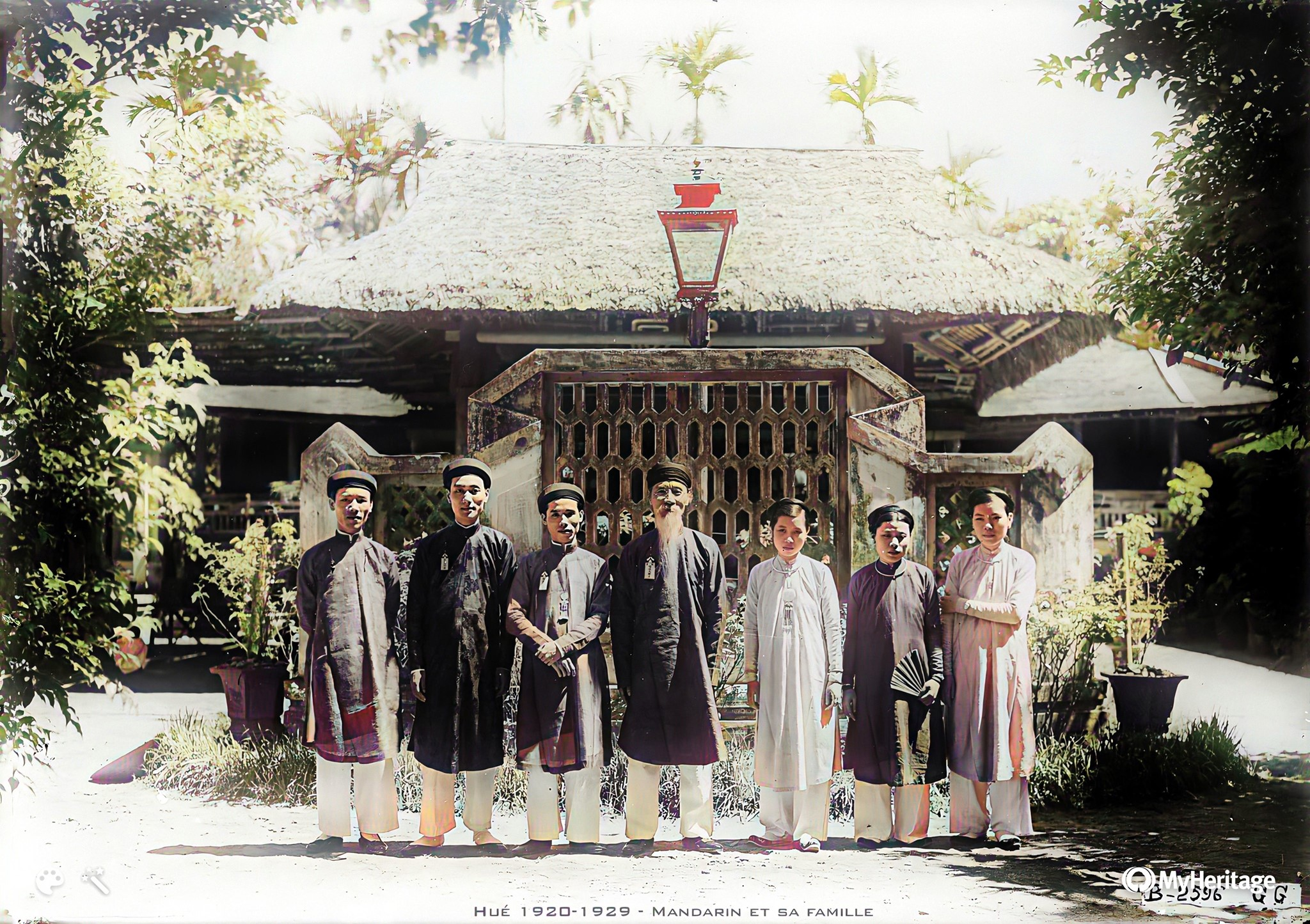
Family of imperial member Nguyễn Phúc Hồng Khẳng (1861 – 1931) (middle) son of prince Nguyễn Phúc Miên Thẩm in 1920s at his private mansion in Huế.

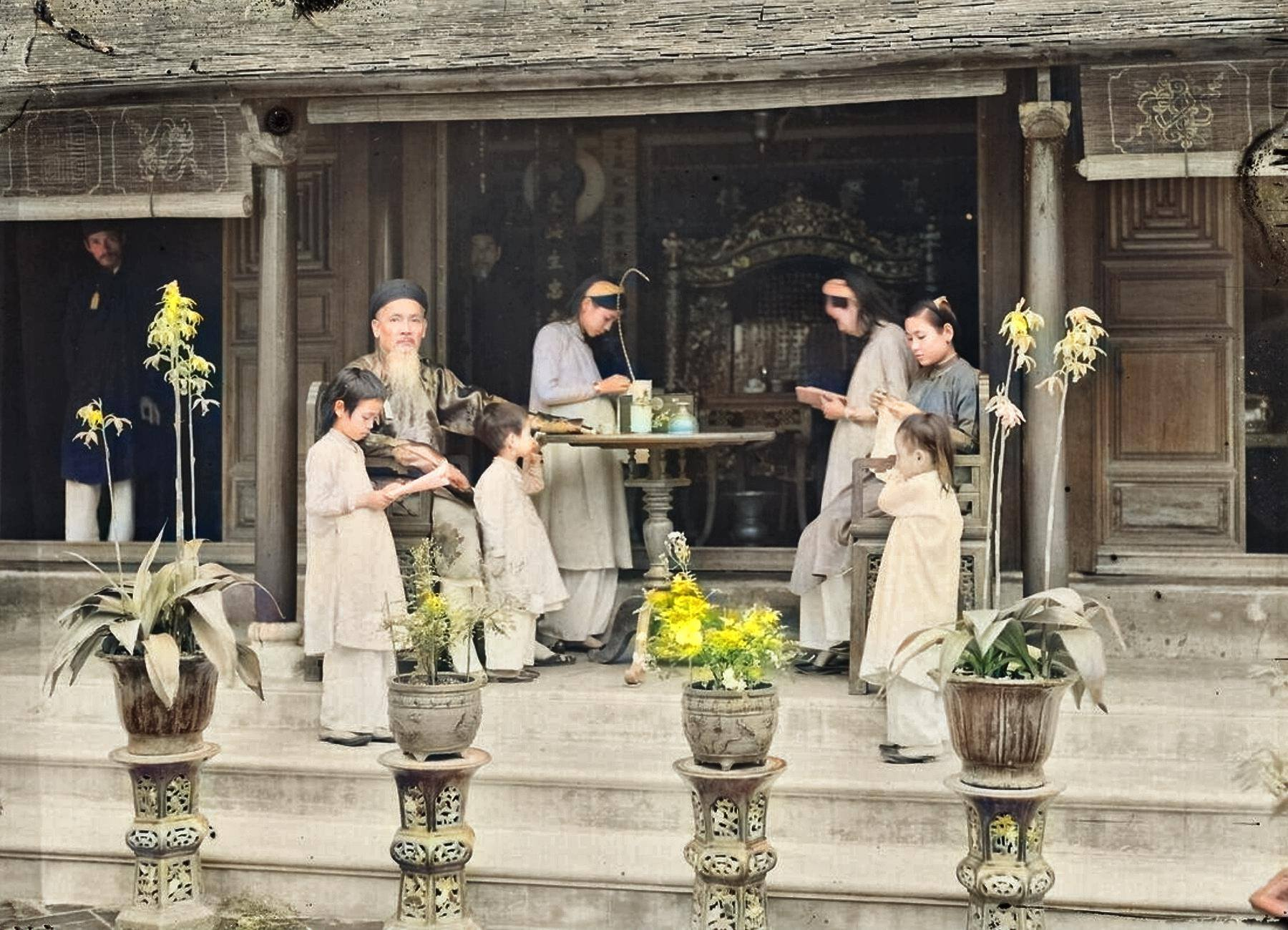
Noble family in 1927

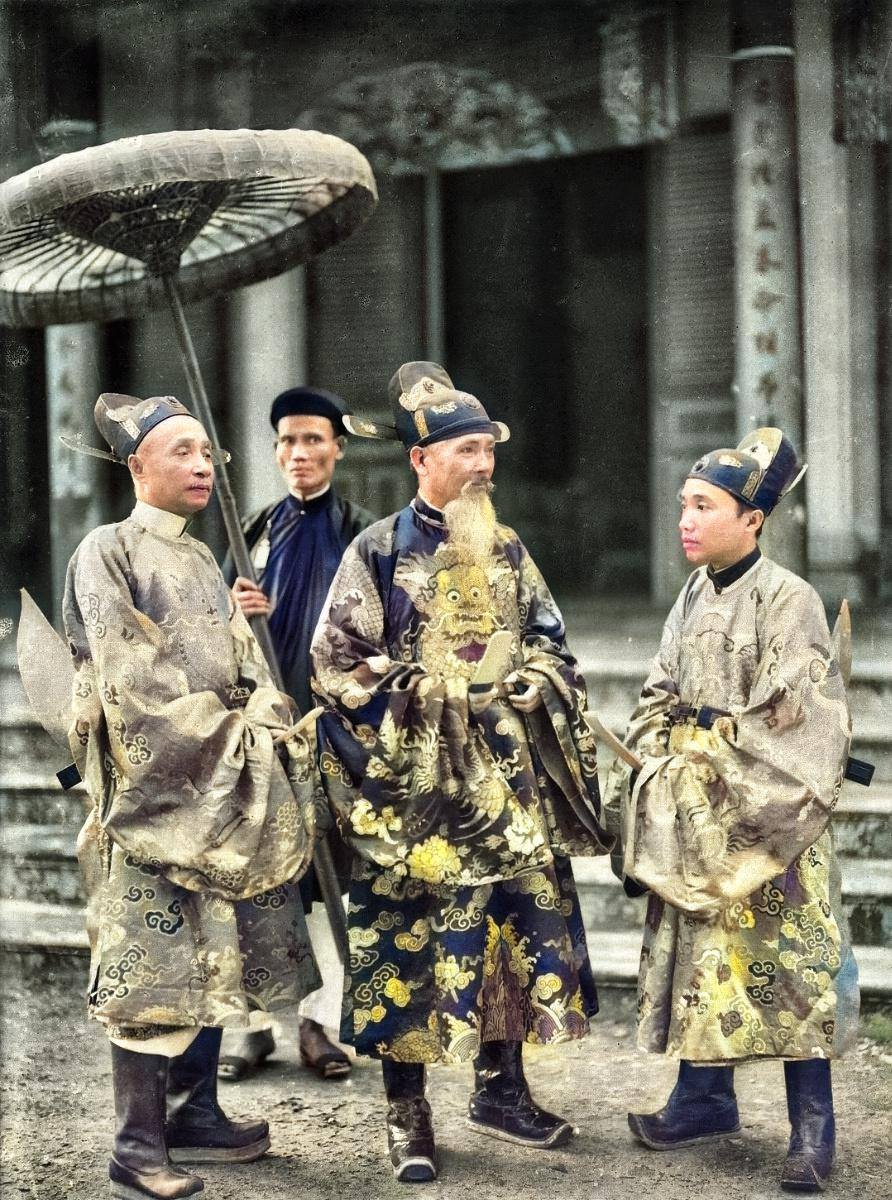
High ranking officials in Thái Bình ,1928.

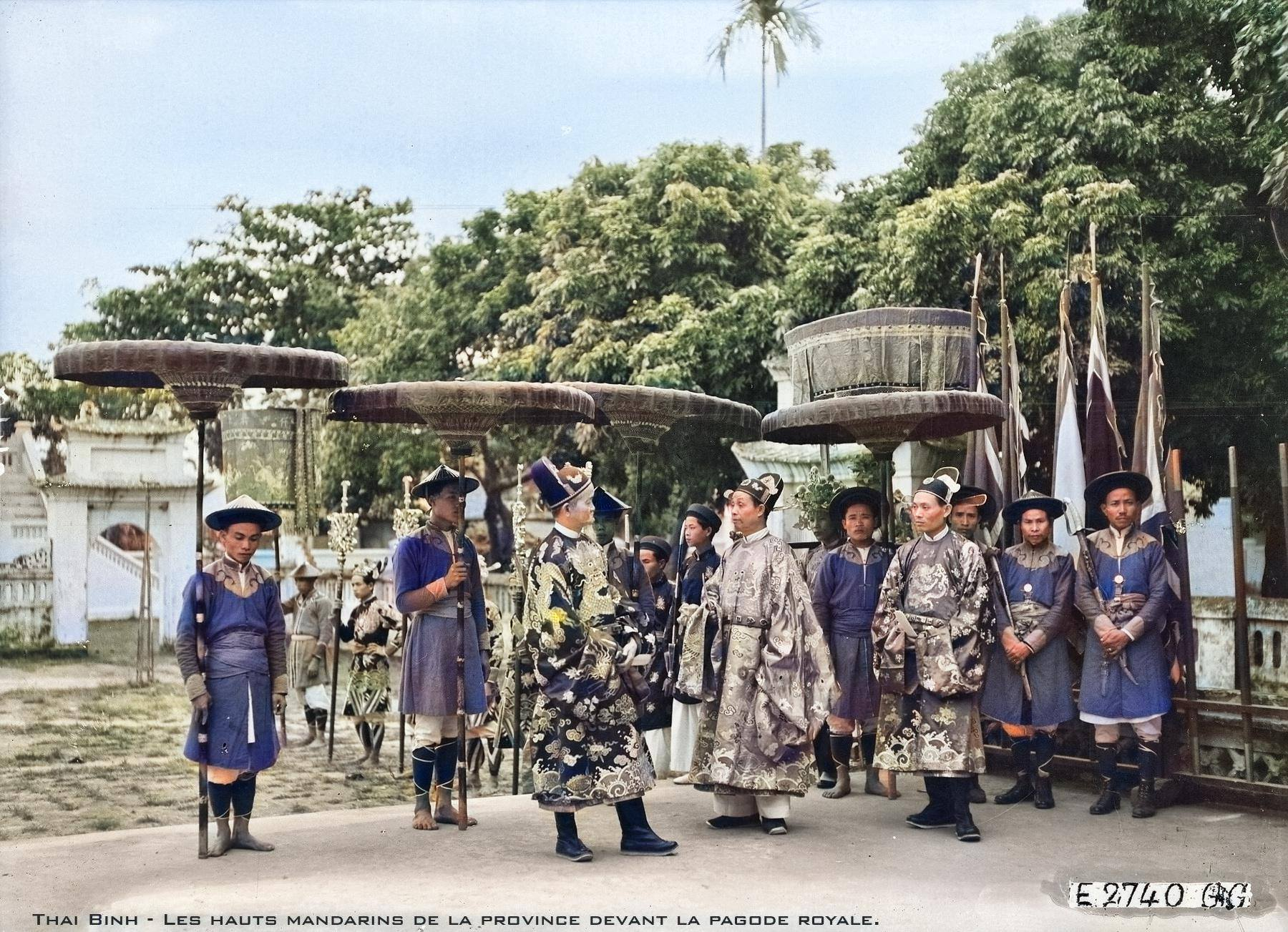
Mandarins at Mayor house in Thái Bình, 1928.

The noble titles of Vietnam can be divided into two categories: (A) Six titles which exclusively reserved for princes of imperial blood were, in ancient China, these were devolved to kings and tributary princes, as well as twelve other less important titles intended for the descendants of princes of imperial blood, with a reduction of "one degree for each successive generation". (B) Five titles of nobility reserved for mandarins, regardless of origin (related to the Emperor or of popular origin), to reward merits, and, more particularly, military merits. These were given the five titles of "Công" (公), "Hầu" (侯), "Bá" (伯), "Tử" (子), and "Nam" (男). Noble titles from both category A and B are transmissible to the eldest son of the nobleman, with a decrease of one degree with each successive generation.

After the establishment of protectorates over the Nguyễn dynasty by the French in the form of Annam and Tonkin the terminology used in the table above (as "European equivalent") was used by the French to designate dignitaries endowed with titles of nobility. While no protocol has regulated the matter of these designations, over 50 years of use have definitively enshrined these terms for translating Vietnamese noble titles.

== Symbols ==
Seals and other symbolic objects were also given to people after they received a noble title. For example after Léon Sogny received the title of "Baron of An Bình" (安平男) in the year Bảo Đại 14 (保大拾肆年, 1939) he was also given a golden seal and a Kim bài (金牌) with his noble title on it. The seal had the seal script inscription An Bình Nam chi ấn (安平男之印).

== List of French people who have received a Vietnamese noble title during the French protectorate period ==
After the French had established two protectorates in Vietnam, and by analogy with what was done for the Mandarins, titles of nobility were awarded by the Emperor of the Nguyễn dynasty to high-ranking French colonial officials. These noble titles which, formerly giving certain rights and privileges to the Vietnamese that received them, by the 1930s were reduced to being merely a simple pension, were considered to be purely honorary for the French officers who received them. In fact they would usually just receive a patent and a Kim bài on which the title was engraved in chữ Hán.

Between the years 1885 and 1936, a total of 22 noble titles were awarded by the Vietnamese Emperor to French people. This group of people include a French minister, an admiral, two generals, nine governors general of Indochina, and nine senior residents of Annam.

List of senior French officials to whom a noble title had been awarded by the Imperial Court of the Nguyễn dynasty between 1885 and 1937:

Name (Vietnamisation)	Rank in the French administration	Noble title received	Date of the awarding of noble title	Image of the document affirming nobility
de COURCY (Cô-xi)	General-in-chief	Bao-Ho Quan-Vuong	Ordinance of the 10th day, 9th month, 1st year of Hàm Nghi (17 October 1885)	
de CHAMPEAUX (Sâm-bô)	Chargé d’affaires	Bao-Ho Cong	Ordinance of the 10th day, 9th month, 1st year of Hàm Nghi (17 October 1885)	
(Ba-duy-dam)	Vice-Admiral, Chief of Staff	Bao-Quoc-Cong	Ordinance of the 10th day, 9th month, 1st year of Hàm Nghi (17 October 1885)	
WARNET (Ba-nê)	General Commander-in-Chief of the Tonkin Expeditionary Force	Duc-Quoc-Vuong	Ordinance of the 10th day, 9th month, 1st year of Hàm Nghi (17 October 1885)	
(Sanh-bich)		Ve-Quoc-Cong	Ordinance of the 10th day, 9th month, 1st year of Hàm Nghi (17 October 1885)	
RICHAUD (Mi-sô)	Governour General	Pho-Quoc Quan-Vuong	Ordinance of the 10th day, 9th month, 1st year of Hàm Nghi (17 October 1885)	
RHEINARD (Lê-na)	Chargé d’affaires	Luong-Quoc Quan-Vuong	Ordinance of the 10th day, 9th month, 1st year of Hàm Nghi (17 October 1885)	
ROUSSEAU (Du xô)	Governour General	Pho Nam Vuong	Ordinance of the 6th day, 2nd month, 8th year of Thành Thái (March 19, 1896)	
BRIERE (Bo-ri-ê)	Resident Superior of Annam	Ho Nam-Cong	Ordinance of the 6th day, 2nd month, 8th year of Thành Thái (March 19, 1896)	
DUVILLIER (Dô-vi-ê)	1st class Vice-Resident, Government Commissioner	Ve-Vo-Hau	Ordinance of the 6th day, 2nd month, 8th year of Thành Thái (March 19, 1896)	
BOULLOCHE (Bô-lô-so)	Senior Resident	Ta Quoc Vuong	Ordinance of the 19th day, 6th month, 11th year of Thành Thái (July 26, 1899)	
BEAU (Bô)	Governour General	Phu Quoc Vuong	Ordinance of the 24th day, 1st month, 2nd year of Duy Tân (February 25, 1908)	
LEVECQUE (Le-viet)	Senior Resident of Annam	Phu Quoc Cong	Ordinance of the 24th day, 1st month, 2nd year of Duy Tân (February 25, 1908)	
LUCE (Luc-so)	Governour General p. i.	Pho-Nam Quan-Vuong	Ordinance of the 22nd day, 11th month, 5th year Duy Tân (January 10, 1912)	
GROLEAU (Cô-rô-lô)	Resident Superior of Annam	Pho-Nam-Cong	Ordinance of the 22nd day, 11th month, 5th year Duy Tân (January 10, 1912)	
SESTIER (Xich-xê)	Senior Resident p. i.	Pho-Nam-Cong	Ordinance of the 22nd day, 11th month, 5th year Duy Tân (January 10, 1912)	
SARRAUT (Sa-lô)	Governour General	Phu-Nam	Ordinance of the 29th day, 12th month, 5th year Duy Tân (February 16, 1912)	
PASQUIER (Bac-kê)	Governour General	Trach-Nam Quan-Vuong	Ordinance of the 2nd day, 2nd month, 6th year Bảo Đại (May 20, 1931)	
ROBIN (Rô-binh)	Governour General p. i.	An-Tinh-Cong	15th day, 4th month, 8th year Bảo Đại ordinance (May 9, 1933)	
CHÂTEL (Sa-tiên)	Resident Superior of Annam	Nghe-Quoc-Cong	15th day, 4th month, 8th year Bảo Đại ordinance (May 9, 1933)	
CHARLES (Sa-lê)	Honorary Governor General	Te-Nam-Vuong	Ordinance of the 19th day, 3rd month, 9th year Bảo Đại (May 2, 1934)	
GRAFFEUIL (Co-la-phoi)	Senior Resident	Te-Quoc-Cong	Ordinance of the 19th day, 3rd month, 11th year Bảo Đại (May 9, 1936)	
Léon Sogny	Chief of security of Annam	Baron of An Bình	7 May 1939	

== See also ==
- Chinese nobility
  - Royal and noble ranks of the Qing dynasty
- Kazoku
- Korean nobility
  - Styles and titles in the Joseon dynasty
- Trần dynasty
