= Bai (decoration) =

Imperial Vietnamese decoration for merit

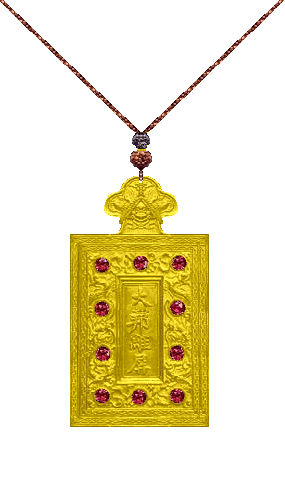
Bai

The Bài (牌) was an imperial Vietnamese decoration for merit. The decoration, an oblong shield of gold set with ten rubies, was worn on a cord around the neck. It was given to princes, mandarins, generals, ministers and the highest civil servants.

The decoration is very old but was reformed by the emperor Thành Thái in 1889. It ceased to exist after the fall of the Vietnamese monarchy in 1945.

== Gallery ==
=== Emperors with the Bai ===
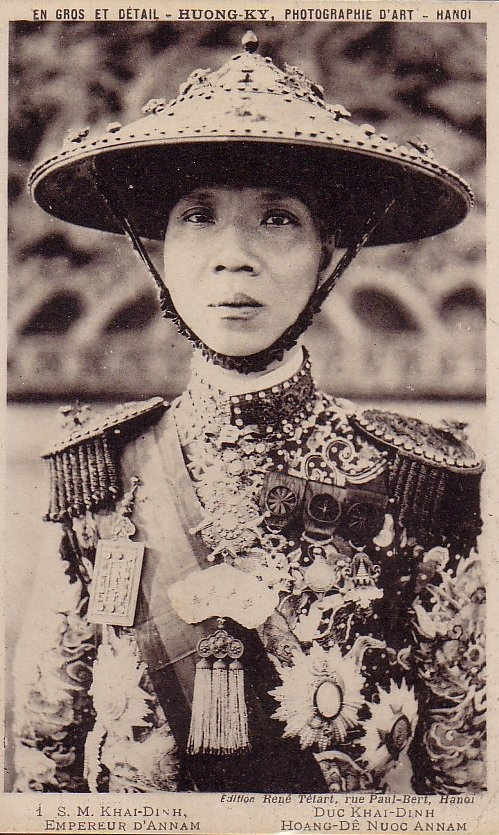
Emperor Khải Định with Bài and Kim Khánh

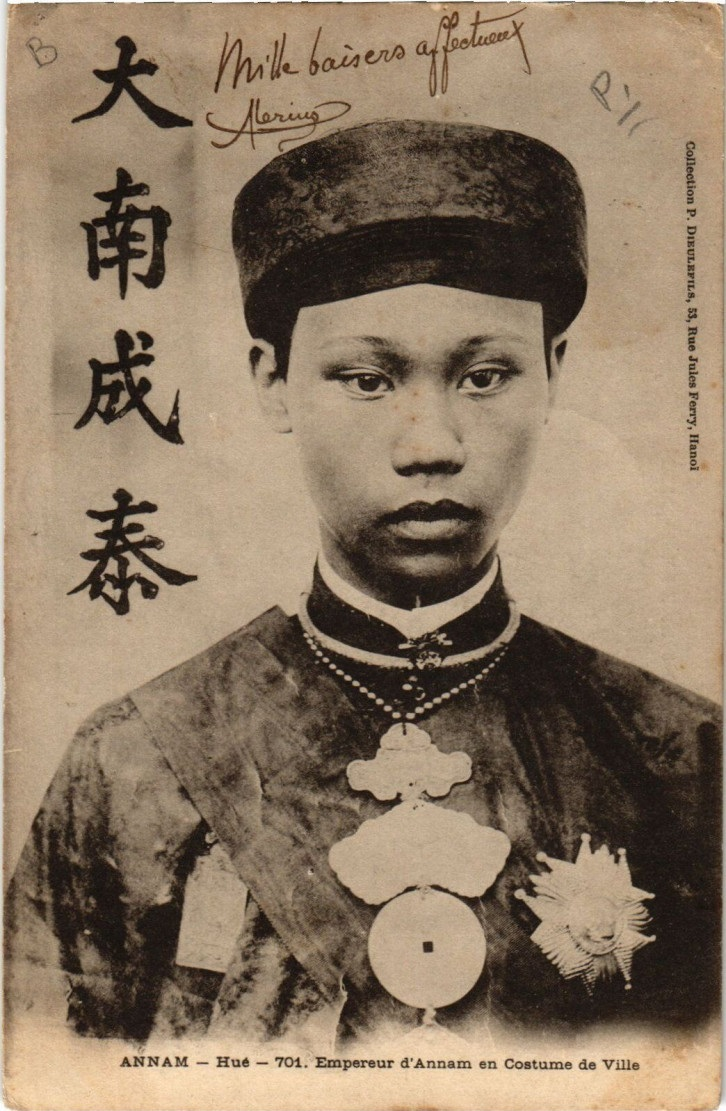
Emperor Thành Thái with Bài and Kim Khánh

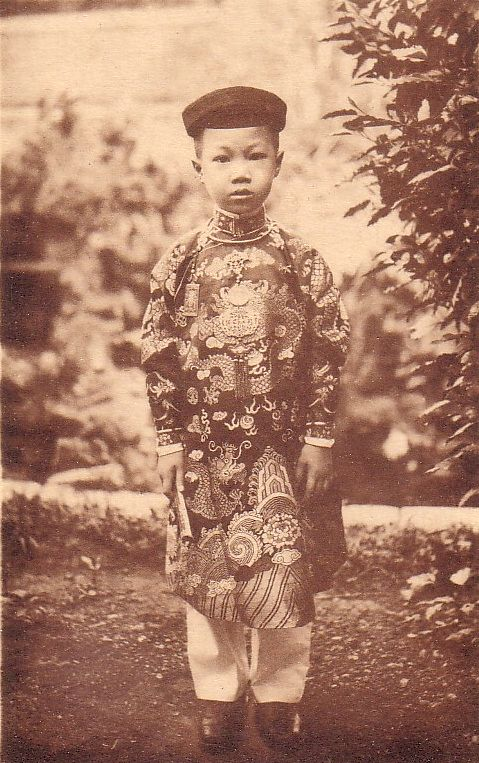
Emperor Bảo Đại with Bài and Kim Khánh
