= Young Communist League of Estonia =

Communist youth organization based in Estonia

Young Communist League of Estonia EKNÜ Estonian: Eestimaa Kommunistlik Noorsooühing
- Founded: 1920
- Dissolved: 1940
- Succeeded by: Leninist Young Communist League of Estonia
- Ideology: Communism; Marxism-Leninism
- Mother party: Communist Party of Estonia
- International affiliation: Communist Youth International

Young Communist League of Estonia (Estonian: Eestimaa Kommunistlik Noorsooühing, EKNÜ) was the youth wing of the Communist Party of Estonia during the interbellum period.

== Activities and organization ==
EKNÜ was working in a clandestine manner. It published Noor Proletaarlane (1921) and Noor Tööline (1922–1923). There are other publications from the EKNÜ that were written by Kalju Tiro. EKNÜ was a section of the Communist Youth International. After the incorporation of Estonia into the Soviet Union on 6 August 1940, EKNÜ merged into the All-Union Leninist Young Communist League (VLKSM). The Estonian branch of VLKSM had the name 'Leninist Young Communist League of Estonia' (Eestimaa Leninlik Kommunistlik Noorsooühing, ELKNÜ).

== Sources ==
- Parming, Tönu. The Electoral Achievements of the Communist Party, 1920-1940. Slavic Review, Vol. 42, No. 3. (Autumn, 1983), pp. 426–447.
