= 1963 Estonian Supreme Soviet election =

Elections to the Supreme Soviet of the Estonian SSR were held on 17 March 1963. The Bloc of Communists and Non-Party Candidates was the only party permitted to contest the elections, and won all 178 seats.

== Electoral system ==
The election was held in accordance with the Estonian SSR Electoral Law of 1947. Candidates were pre-approved through a single-list system.

== Results ==
According to the Supreme Soviet Registry (ERA.R-1.1.10), 131 deputies were Communist Party members and 43 were non-party members. Representation included 47 women and deputies from 89 urban and 85 rural districts.

Party	Votes	%	Seats
Bloc of Communists and Non-Party Candidates		99.53	178
Against		0.47	–
Total			178
Registered voters/turnout		99.55	
Source: Liivik

== Aftermath ==
Following the elections, key positions confirmed by the Supreme Soviet included Johannes Käbin as First Secretary, Valter Klauson as chairman of the Council of Ministers and August Vaino as chairman of the Presidium of the Supreme Soviet.

== See also ==
- List of members of the Supreme Soviet of the Estonian Soviet Socialist Republic, 1963–1967

== Bibliography ==
1. Eesti NSV Ülemnõukogu IX koosseis (1963). Estonian National Archives, ERA.R-1.1.10
2. Statistical Yearbook of Estonian SSR (1964). Tallinn: State Publishing House
3. "On Elections to Supreme Soviets of USSR Republics" (1947). Vedomosti Verkhovnogo Soveta SSSR
4. Kommunist (05.03.1963). Tallinn: EKP Central Committee
