= Oskar Cher =

Estonian communist activist (1913–1942)

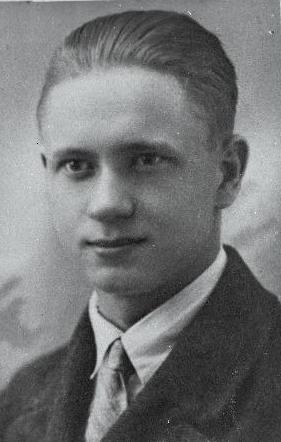
- Oskar Cher in 1932
- Born: 2 September 1913; Reval
- Died: 2 June 1942 (aged 28); Tallinn
- Occupations: Journalist, communist activist

Oskar Cher (2 September 1913 – 2 June 1942) was an Estonian communist activist.

== Biography ==
Cher was born in Reval (now Tallinn). In his youth, he was a member of the Estonian Young Socialist League. He worked as a journalist in the early 1930s, and joined the banned Communist Party of Estonia (EKP) in 1933. The same year, he was arrested and imprisoned.

Cher was released in 1935. He was arrested again in 1936, but soon released and served in the Estonian Army. After Estonia was occupied by the Soviet Union in 1940, Cher organized the EKP in Läänemaa. In 1941, he was made secretary of the Leninist Young Communist League of Estonia.

When Nazi Germany occupied Estonia in 1941, Cher joined the communist resistance movement. He was arrested by the Germans and shot in 1942 in Tallinn.

== Sources ==
- Biography (in Russian)
