= Külaküla =

Village in Estonia

- Village
- Location within Estonia
- Coordinates: 58°46′N 22°30′E
- Country: Estonia
- County: Hiiu County
- Parish: Hiiumaa Parish

Population (2019)
  - Total: 20
- Time zone: UTC+2 (EET)
  - Summer (DST): UTC+3 (EEST)

Külaküla is a village in Hiiumaa Parish, Hiiu County in northwestern Estonia.

The village name is somewhat peculiar as it translates directly as "Village village".

Soviet Estonian political leader Vaino Väljas (born 1931) was born in Külaküla.
