= Jaan Lüllemets =

Estonian politician

First Secretary of the Leninist Young Communist League of Estonia
- In office 1961–1964
- Preceded by: Vaino Väljas
- Succeeded by: Taimo Suuresaar

Member of the Supreme Soviet of the Estonian Soviet Socialist Republic
- In office 1963–1971

Personal details
- Born: 19 October 1932
- Died: 10 August 2004 (aged 71)
- Political party: Communist Party of Estonia

Jaan Lüllemets (19 October 1932 – 10 August 2004) was a communist politician in the Estonian Soviet Socialist Republic. He served as First Secretary of the Central Committee of the Leninist Young Communist League of Estonia (ELKNÜ) from 1961 to 1964 and was a member of the Estonian Supreme Soviet from 1963 to 1967. He also served as the district party secretary in Kohtla-Järve during the 1970s. Following Estonian independence, Lüllemets served as head of the Industrial Enterprises Division of the Ministry of Industry and Energy.
