= Indrek Toome =

Estonian politician and entrepreneur (1943–2023)

- Toome in 1972

Chairman of the Council of Ministers of the Estonian SSR
- In office 16 November 1988 – 24 December 1989
- Preceded by: Bruno Saul
- Succeeded by: Office abolished

Prime Minister of the Estonian SSR
- In office 25 December 1989 – 3 April 1990
- Preceded by: Office established
- Succeeded by: Edgar Savisaar

Personal details
- Born: 19 September 1943 Tallinn, then part of Generalbezirk Estland, Reichskommissariat Ostland
- Died: 28 February 2023 (aged 79)

Indrek Toome (19 September 1943 – 28 February 2023) was an Estonian politician and entrepreneur. As a top level communist party official, he held several important positions in the leadership of the Estonian SSR. Becoming the chairman of the Council of Ministers of the Estonian SSR in 1988, and continuing as the prime minister of the Estonian SSR in 1989, after the renaming of the Council of Ministers to the Government.

For the 1990 Estonian Supreme Soviet election, Toome organized a list Democratic alliance "Free Estonia" which got 15 seats out of 105 and ended up in opposition with the election winners Popular Front, who formed the new government.

In independent Estonia, Toome worked as a real estate businessman. Among other things, he was the major owner of Viru Keskus.

== Biography ==
Toome was born in Tallinn on 19 September 1943, during the German occupation of Estonia. He completed his studies in 1968 as an electrical engineer at the Polytechnic Institute in Tallinn (now Tallinn University of Technology).

From 1972 to 1990, Toome held various senior posts in the Estonian branch of the Soviet Young Communist League (Komsomol) and the regional organization of the Soviet Union's Communist Party in the Estonian SSR.

From 16 November 1988 until 3 April 1990, Toome was chairman of the Council of Ministers of the Estonian SSR, a position similar to head of provincial government, in then Soviet-controlled Estonia. It was under his leadership that the Soviet authorities began to succumb to pressure from the Singing Revolution, the peaceful liberation of Estonia from the 1944–1991 Soviet occupation. With the collapse of Soviet regime in Estonia, on 3 April 1990, after the first free elections in Estonia since before World War II, he peacefully handed over his office to Edgar Savisaar. On 20 August 1991, Estonia restored its full independence.

In 1990-1992, Toome was elected member of the last Soviet-era Estonian (Ülemnõukogu). On 20 August 1991, he was one of the 69 members of the parliament who declared the illegal Soviet occupation and annexation of the country terminated, and proclaimed the full restoration of the independence of Estonia.

After 1992, Toome was a partner at an estate agency. In 1995, he was convicted by the Tallinn District and fined for an attempt to bribe officials of the Estonian Internal Security Service (KAPO).
