= Vaino Väljas =

Soviet and Estonian politician (1931–2024)

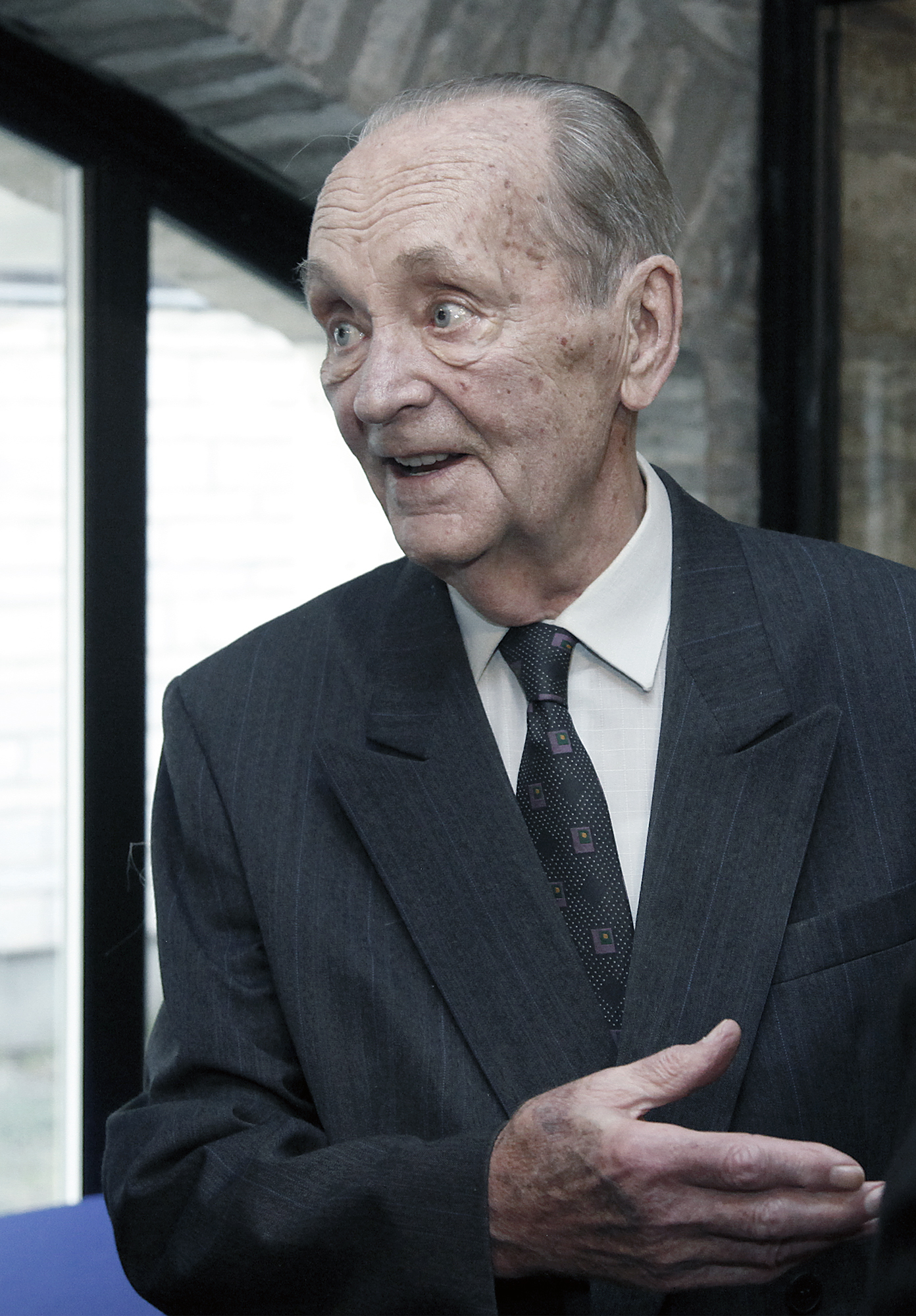
- Väljas in 2013

Leader of the Estonian Left Party
- In office 25 March 1990 – 1 June 1995
- Preceded by: Party established
- Succeeded by: Hillar Eller

First Secretary of the Communist Party of Estonia
- In office 1988–1990
- Preceded by: Karl Vaino
- Succeeded by: Position abolished

First Secretary of the Leninist Young Communist League of Estonia
- In office 1955–1961
- Preceded by: Boris Tolbast
- Succeeded by: Jaan Lüllemets

Personal details
- Born: 28 March 1931 Külaküla, Hiiumaa, Estonia
- Died: 16 January 2024 (aged 92)
- Resting place: Metsakalmistu
- Party: Estonian Left Party

Vaino Väljas (28 March 1931 – 16 January 2024) was a Soviet and Estonian diplomat and politician. Väljas was leader of the Communist party in Soviet Estonia from 1988 to 1991, and the leader of Democratic Estonian Workers Party from 1992 to 1995 in independent Estonia.

== Biography ==
Vaino Väljas was born on 28 March 1931 on the island of Hiiumaa in Estonia. After Estonia was annexed in 1944 by the USSR, he joined the communist bureaucracy. In 1949, he began working at the Komsomol. Väljas became a member of the Soviet Communist Party in 1952 and would graduate from Tartu State University in 1955. From 1955 to 1961 he held the office of First Secretary of the Central Committee of the Leninist Young Communist League of Estonia. From 1961 to 1971, Väljas was First Secretary of the Tallinn City Committee of the Communist Party of Estonia. He would then serve as the Chairman of the 6th Supreme Soviet of the Estonian SSR in 1963–1967. From 1971 to 1980, he was appointed as the Secretary of the Central Committee of the Communist Party of Estonia.

Since Väljas was considered to be sympathetic to Estonian nationalism, he was removed from Estonia by the central leadership in Moscow, and instead appointed as the ambassador of the Soviet Union to Venezuela in 1980, and later to Nicaragua in 1986. During his time in Nicaragua, he played a vital role in the signing of the peace treaty between the right-wing and leftist rebels. As the Singing Revolution gained momentum alongside the Estonian independence movement in 1988, the liberal communist Väljas was recalled from Nicaragua and once again appointed as the leader of the communist party in Estonia. Formally, he was first secretary of the Communist Party of the Estonian SSR from 16 June 1988 to April 1990, and its chairman from April 1990 to August 1991. The Communist party lost its monopoly of power in February 1990. Väljas later voted for the Estonian Restoration of Independence in August 1991.

After the dissolution of the Soviet Union, Väljas would live quietly in Tallinn. He would serve as the chair of the Estonian Democratic Labour Party from 1992 until 1995. In 2021, he was nominated for the coat of arms of Tallinn, with his nomination being sponsored by the city government. Väljas died on 16 January 2024, at the age of 92.

== Awards ==
- (Soviet Union) Order of Lenin (1965)
- (Soviet Union) 3 Orders of the Red Banner of Labour (1958, 1971, and 1973)
- (Soviet Union) Order of Friendship of Peoples (1981)
- (Estonia) Order of the National Coat of Arms (2002)
- (Estonia) Order of the White Star (2006)
- (Estonia) Aadu Luukas Mission Award (2017)
- (Estonia) Order of the Tallinn Coat of Arms (2021)
- Order of the Liberator (Venezuela, 1986)

== Notes ==
Political offices
Preceded by Karl Vaino	First Secretary of the Communist Party of Estonia; 1988–1990	Succeeded by Office abolished
