= Kim Khánh =

Order of Merit of the Empire of Vietnam

Order of Kim Khánh (Order of the Golden Gong)
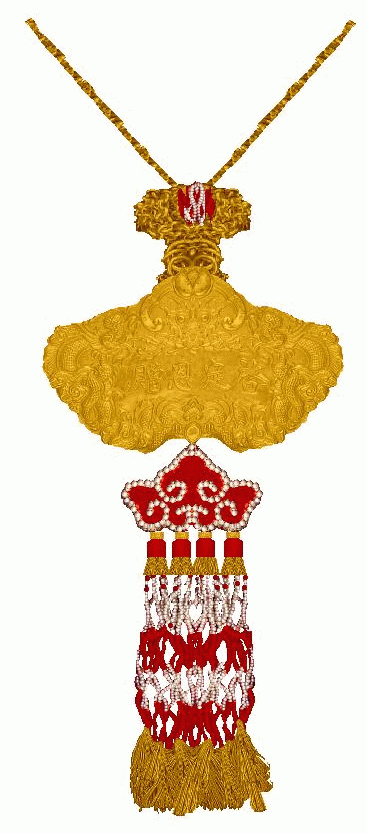

Awarded by Emperors of Vietnam
- Type: Order
- Status: Obsolete

Precedence
- Next (higher): National Order of Vietnam
- Next (lower): The Golden Pendant Decoration
- Ribbon of the order

The Order of Kim Khánh (Vietnamese: Kim khánh, chữ Hán: 金磬) was an Order of Merit of the Empire of Vietnam. The order was altered when Vietnam became a republic.

The emperor awarded this decoration to his mandarins or high officials. It is suited for their silken gowns. It consists of a golden plaque in the shape of a traditional Vietnamese gong with Chinese characters and symbols like dragons, dragon's paws with a pearl, fo-dogs, turtles and phoenixes. Attached to the plaque are a traditional depiction of a bat in orange and white pearls, beads of red and white coral, fresh water pearls and gold. The Chinese characters mean "A visible sign of thanks and good will". On the back the words "awarded by the Emperor Khải Định" are written.

In 1875 a Special Class of the order was given to the French President.

In a more simple version the Khim Khanh was awarded to French colonial administrators and princes in Asia like the Susuhunan of Surakarta Pakubuwono X.

The jewel is 85 millimeter wide and 153 millimeter high. It was awarded in a rectangular silver or gold box with a decor of dragons and a red silk lining.

== History ==
The initial Kim Khánh were issued either during the reign of the Gia Long Emperor or Minh Mạng Emperor and it is not known when the decoration was first issued or what classes they initially had. An example of one of these early Kim Khánh dating to the reign of Thiệu Trị had a design of two embossed dragons facing the sun, enhanced with fine pearls, with two chữ Hán reading Ân tứ (恩賜, "[Emperor's] Merciful Gift") composed of pearls. This early Kim Khánh was intended for a member of the imperial family or for one of the four eminent dignitaries advisers to the Emperor, the "Pillars of the Empire".

The Kim Khánh was rarely granted to people and it was intended to reward the achievements of general and superior officers as well as the distinguished service of civilian mandarins. Only high rank civil mandarins and military mandarins had the right to wear the Kim Khánh in public, other recipients had to keep them at home. These people would receive either the sapèque d'argent or the sapèque d'or to wear in public (these decorations were introduced by decree by the Đồng Khánh Emperor in the year 1885).

The Emperor awarded a Đại hạng Kim Khánh to high-rank mandarins having reached an advanced age (60 or 70 years) that have earned it, bearing a reverse inscription celebrating his wisdom, his great age, or his merits.

== Classes and variants ==
By decree of the Đồng Khánh Emperor in 1885 the gong-shaped plate of the Kim Khánh was either made of gold (Kim Khánh), imitation gold (Tử Kim Khánh), or in silver (Ngân Khánh). Its design features two dragons in relief facing the sun (or a flaming pearl).

Until 1885 the Kim Khánh only had 2 classes:

Class	Image
Đại hạng Kim Khánh	
Kim Khánh	

In 1885 the Đồng Khánh Emperor divided the Kim Khánh into 3 classes, creating a total of 4 classes:

Class	Description	Image
Đại hạng Kim Khánh	The obverse inscription reads Đồng Khánh sắc tứ (同慶敕賜, "Awarded by the Đồng Khánh Emperor") et au revers Báo nghĩa thù huân (報義酬勳, "Show gratitude and return the benefits")	
Trung Kim Khánh	Similar to the above, but lighter in weight.	
Thứ Kim Khánh	Has the obverse inscription Sanh thiện thượng công (旌善賞功, "To perpetuate kindness and reward merits").	
Tiểu Kim Khánh	With the inscription Lao năng khả tưởng (勞能可獎, "Conducted work and has talent worthy of praise").	

In the year Thành Thái 12 (1900) the Kim Khánh for Vietnamese mandarins were given the following inscriptions:

Inscription (chữ Quốc ngữ)	Inscription (chữ Hán)	English translation	Image
Báo nghĩa thù huân	報義酬勳	Show gratitude and return the benefits	
Gia thiện sanh năng	嘉善旌能	Praise kindness and perpetuate talent	
Lao năng khả tưởng	勞能可獎	Conducted work and has talent worthy of praise	

For both the French and foreigners, the Thành Thái Emperor created 3 classes of Kim Khánh. The obverse side of these all bears the inscription Đại Nam Hoàng Đế sắc tử (大南皇帝敕賜, "Awarded by the Emperor of the Great South") but have different reverse inscriptions.

Inscription (chữ Quốc ngữ)	Inscription (chữ Hán)	English translation	Image
Nhất hạng Kim Khánh	一項金磬	First class Kim Khánh.	
Nhị hạng Kim Khánh	二項金磬	Second class Kim Khánh.	
Tam hạng Kim Khánh	三項金磬	Third class Kim Khánh.	

== Ngọc Khánh ==
The Ngọc Khánh (玉磬, "jade gong") is a higher distinction to the Kim Khánh. The Ngọc Khánh were only reserved for the deserving First Class Mandarins. This decoration was made of jade and had the inscription Trân bửu (珍寶, "Precious treasures") preceded by the name of the Emperor.

== South Vietnam ==
There is a later version of the Kim Khánh where the dragons and inscriptions are replaced by a bamboo grove, a brush (representing civil mandarins) and a sword (representing military mandarins). This was the national emblem of the First Republic of Vietnam during the presidency of Ngô Đình Diệm.

== See also ==
- Imperial Order of the Dragon of Annam
