= Tallinn Museum of Orders of Knighthood =

Museum in Tallinn, Estonia

Coordinates: 59°26′11″N 24°44′44″E

- Tallinna rüütliordude muuseum
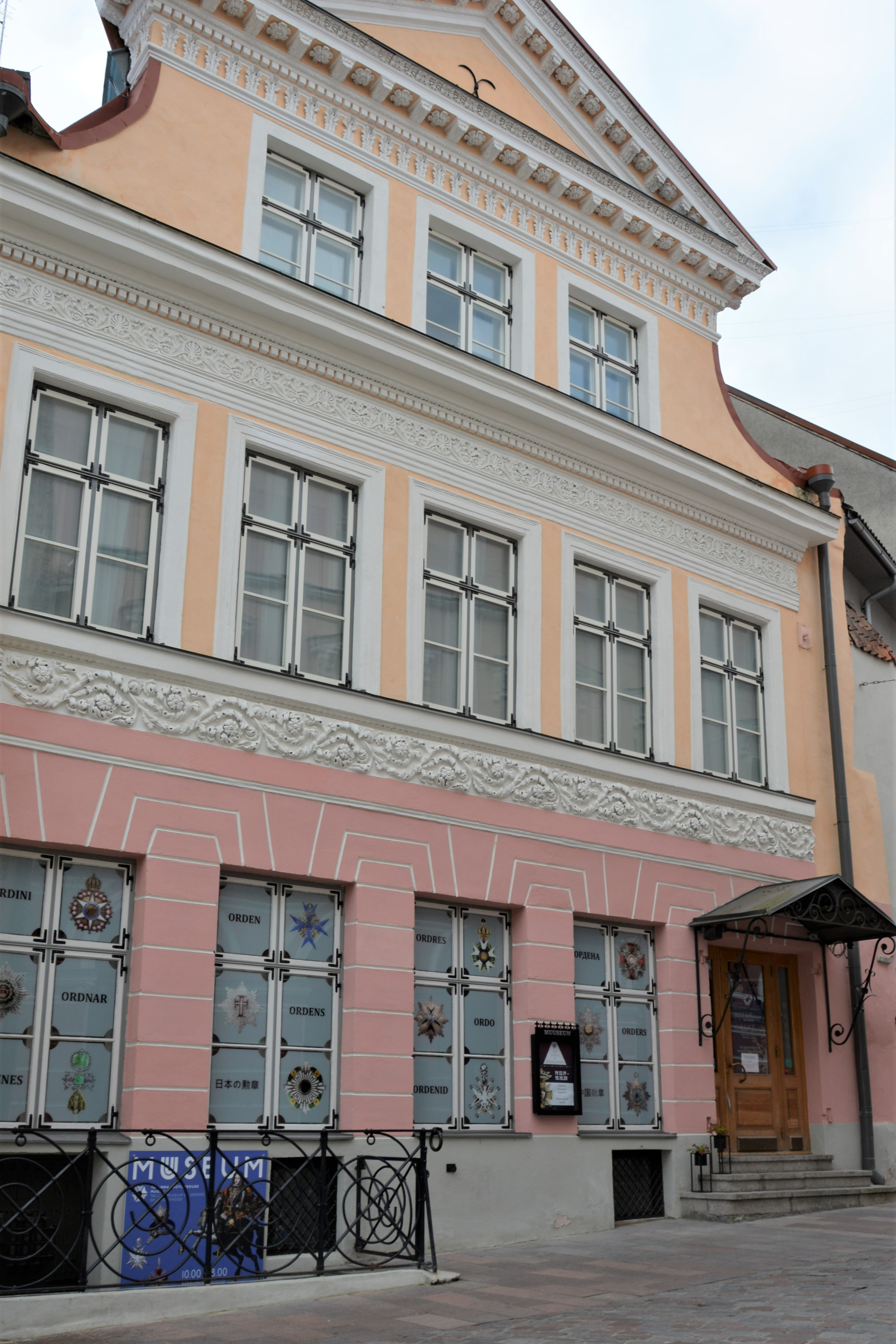
- Established: January 2017
- Location: Kuninga 3, Old Town, 10146 Tallinn, Estonia
- Type: History museum
- Website: https://tallinnmuseum.com/

The Tallinn Museum of Orders of Knighthood (Estonian: Tallinna Rüütliordude Muuseum) is a private museum of history and culture in Tallinn, Estonia. The main focus of the museum is the history of orders of knighthood and merit from all over the world. The museum is located in a historical medieval building at Kuninga 3 in Tallinn Old Town, and the permanent exhibition consists of close to a thousand original costumes, collars, stars, badges and other items related to orders of knighthood with the oldest exhibits dating to the beginning of the 18th century.

== History ==
The opening of the museum took place in January 2017. A medieval merchant's house in Tallinn Old Town – contemporary to some of the oldest orders of knighthood in the museum – was chosen as the location.

In September 2017, Tallinn Museum of Orders of Knighthood hosted the XI European Conference of Phaleristic Societies. Conference materials were published by the museum in 2018.

Specialized exhibitions held by the museum include Jewels of Freemasonry (2020), Treasures from King Street (2020), 100 years of the Order of the Estonian Red Cross (2019); 800th Anniversary of the Order of the Dannebrog (2019), Orders of Estonia - an Integral Symbol of Independence (2018).

== Collection ==
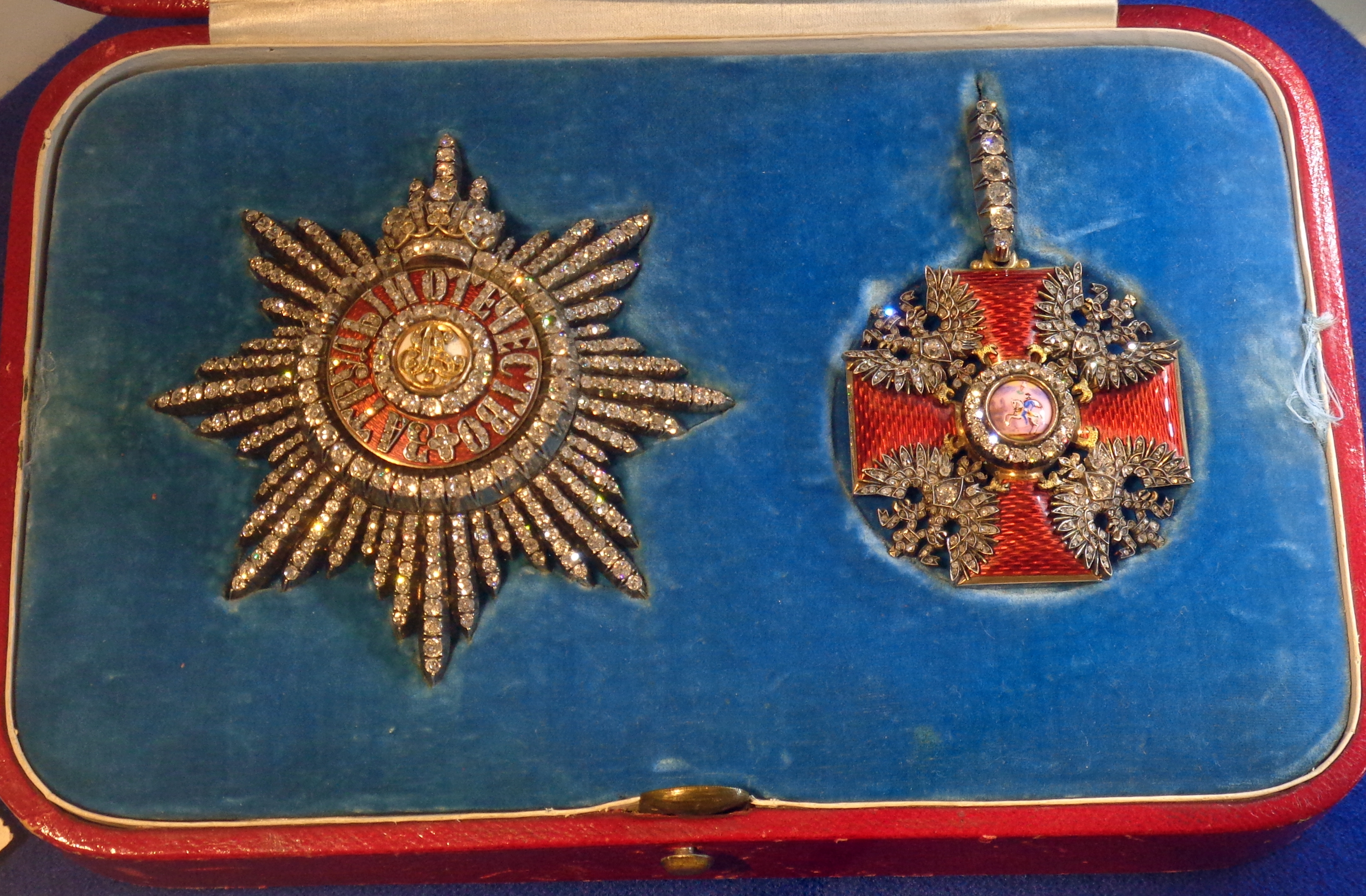
Order of St Alexander Nevsky with diamonds, awarded by Nicholas II of Russia to future French president Paul Deschanel; gold, silver, 840 diamonds, enamel

The museum’s collection spans several centuries. Its curation focuses not only on the meaning behind the award itself but on the items’ craftsmanship, and on their importance as ’wearable awards’. The permanent exhibition is displayed in three halls covering the history of orders, the awarding system, and its significance in Europe, the Americas, Africa, and the Far East. The display information often details the aesthetic symbolism of each award, such as how ribbon colours are often strongly connected to their national or principal identity.

Many older orders have interesting origin stories, which are based both in fact and in fiction. Such as the Danish Order of the Dannebrog, which is closely tied with Tallinn through the Battle of Lyndanisse; the Japanese Order of the Sacred Treasures, which refers to the time when Japan received its first Emperor; the Order of the Garter, allegedly named for a ladies garter which fell to the floor during a ball; and the most romantic order of them all – the Order of the Rose of the Empire of Brazil, with its motto For Love and Fidelity (Portuguese: Amor e Fidelidade).

In 2021 the basic exhibition of the museum was completely renewed to better present a clearer difference between grand orders in one grade and orders of merit in several grades and their evolution into today's awarding system. Additionally, the collection was divided into subject themes, such as exclusive military orders for bravery on the battlefield and orders for military and civil services awarded in peace time. Orders exclusively for ladies, a tradition dating back to the 17th century, are presented in two separate showcases. Separately presented are orders and awards for Science and Art and Red Cross decorations.

The exhibition also includes original robes of such orders as the Bavarian Order of St George, the English Order of the Garter, the Maltese Order and others.

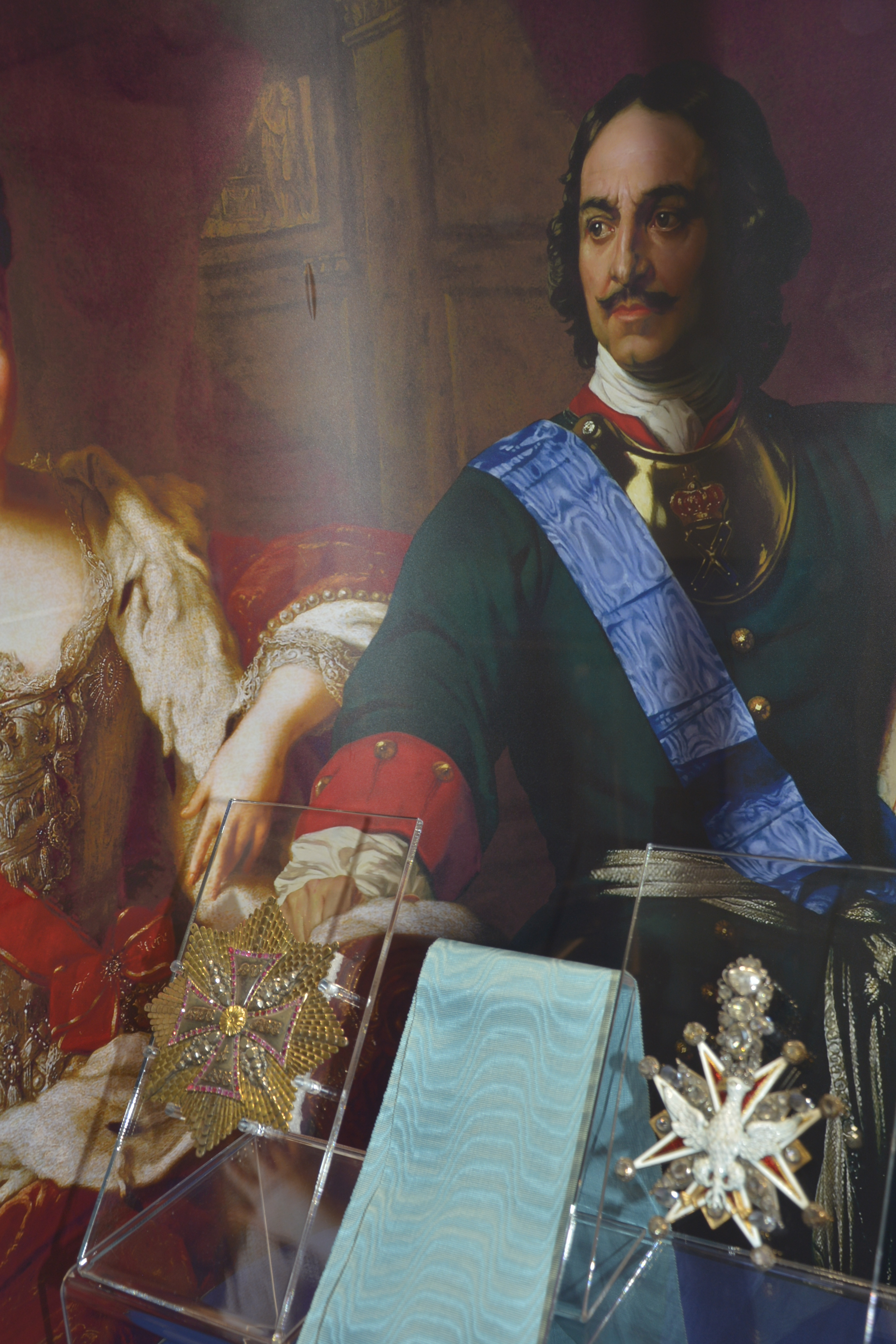
Showcase with the badge of the Order of the White Eagle presented in 1712 to Peter the Great of Russia by the founder of the order – Augustus the Strong, Peter's ally in the Great Northern War. Gold, silver, enamel, diamonds

Some of the most significant exhibits in the museum are the badge of the Polish Order of the White Eagle that belonged to Russian Emperor Peter the Great, the neck badge of the Austrian Order of the Golden Fleece worn by chancellor Klemens von Metternich, the badge of the Order of Saint Alexander Nevsky presented to French president Paul Deschanel, the Order of the Starry Cross which belonged to Empress Charlotte of Mexico.

== Work with the community ==
The museum supports young collectors. In 2018 the museum took an active part in the International Philatelic Exhibition in Tallinn, presenting its own prize for Best Exhibit by Young Collectors.

The museum has a fully equipped Scientific Laboratory. It supports future young scientists and curators with its annual summer programme.

The museum offers guided tours tailored to the specific audience. There is a special educational programme aimed at children.

== Research and publications ==
There have been several publications about the museum in the Bulletin Société des Amis du Musée de la Légion D'honneur Orders et Distinctions, France; Numismaatikko, Finland; Svensk Numismatisk Tidskrift, Sweden; Eesti Ajalugu, Estonia, and others. The museum was featured of the Estonian TV Programme Herald's Stories, ETV+ Morning Programme and others.

=== Publications ===
- TALLINN MUSEUM OF ORDERS OF KNIGHTHOOD – A SHORT HISTORY OF ORDERS FROM THE COLLECTION OF THE MUSEUM A short guide to the Tallinn Museum of Orders of Knighthood, with photographs of the insignia displayed at the museum and short information on the orders. In 4 languages: Estonian, Russian, English, Finnish.
- ESTONIAN RED CROSS 100 EXHIBITION CATALOGUE. In 3 languages: Estonian, Russian, English.
- MATERIALS OF THE XI EUROPEAN CONFERENCE OF PHALERISTIC SOCIETIES. In English.

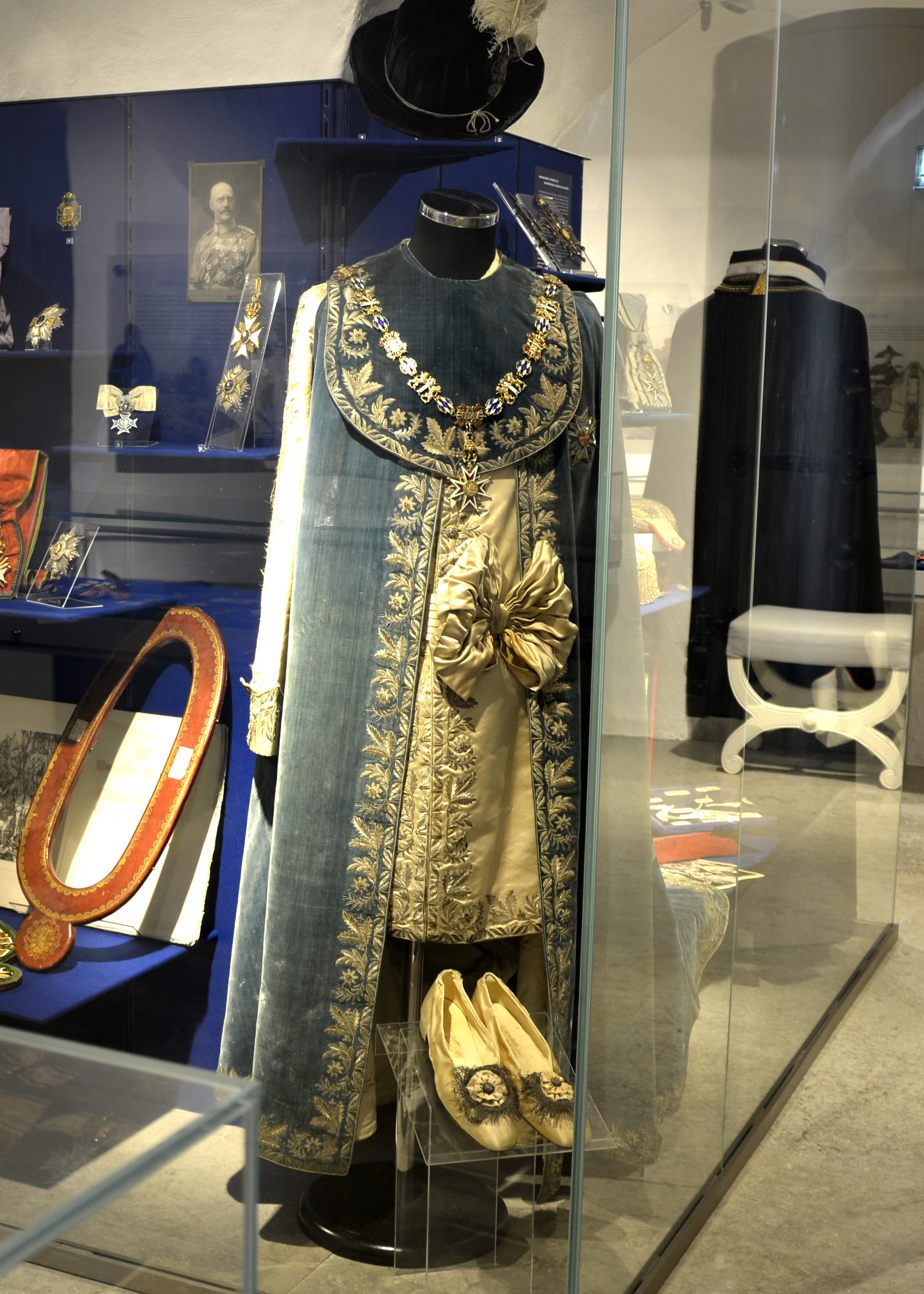
The Ceremonial Robes of the Order of St George (Bavaria). Early 19th century. Velvet, satin, silk, silver thread, ostrich feathers

Articles by the museum's researchers are also published in scientific publications and on the museum's website.
