= Valter Klauson =

Soviet Estonian politician

Valter Klauson (2 January 1914 – 5 December 1988) was a Soviet and Estonian politician.

From 1961 to 1984, he was the Chairman of the Council of Ministers of the Estonian Soviet Socialist Republic. He was born in Tolmachyovo and died in Tallinn.
