= Coat of arms of the Nguyễn dynasty =

Coat of arms of the Nguyễn dynasty Quốc huy triều Nguyễn (國徽朝阮)

Versions
- Variant coat of arms.
- Armiger: Nguyễn dynasty
- Adopted: Thành Thái 15 (1903)
- Relinquished: Bảo Đại 20 (1945) (Note: Abdication of Bảo Đại, see: August Revolution.)
- Supporter: Five-clawed dragon
- Motto: 大南 "Đại Nam" "The Great South"
- Use: Official coat of arms of the Nguyễn dynasty government.

The coat of arms of the Nguyễn dynasty (Vietnamese: Quốc huy triều Nguyễn; Hán-Nôm: 國徽朝阮), officially the national coat of arms of Đại Nam (Vietnamese: Quốc huy Đại Nam; Hán-Nôm: 國徽大南), was the national coat of arms of the Nguyễn dynasty adopted during the reign of the Thành Thái Emperor to be used when accepting diplomatic missions and foreign dignitaries at the Imperial City of Huế.

The coat of arms of the Nguyễn dynasty would later also be used as a personal symbol of its emperors replacing the characters 大南 with their reign era, with the latest of these variants being used in official correspondence during the State of Vietnam period. Khải Định's imperial seal contained a version of the imperial coat of arms but with the six Chinese characters Khải Định Đại Nam Hoàng đế (啟定大南皇帝) on the scroll instead of the country's name. During the Bảo Đại period the scroll only contained two Chinese characters bearing the reign era of the emperor.

== Description ==
A sword per fess charged with a scroll, inscribed with two traditional Chinese characters Đại Nam (大南) and supported by a single five-clawed dragon. (Note: Vietnamese language description: "Quốc Huy Triều Nguyễn với rồng năm móng và 2 chử Đại Nam (大南) viết trên cuốn thư trên thanh kiếm nằm ngang.")

The dragon depicted on the coat of arms has five-claws, which is a sign of imperial authority in imperial China and imperial Vietnam. During the Later Lê and Nguyễn dynasties four-clawed and three-clawed dragons were reserved for subjects as strict regulations existed in how many claws a dragon may have based on the status of the person, only the emperor and his government were allowed to use five-clawed dragons. The scroll depicts the Hán characters 大南 (Đại Nam) as it was the quốc hiệu (國號, 'national name') of Vietnam during most of the Nguyễn dynasty period.

== History ==
According to historians Trần Đức Anh Sơn and Philippe Trương, in 1903 emperor Thành Thái ordered from the Alfred Hache & Co. porcelain factories in Vierzon, Cher department and Paris approximately 310 ceramic items, including four dining sets, four dessert sets, and four tea sets. The common feature of this set is the porcelain white colour, decorated with gold trim in the mouth, lid, inside of the dish, handles. Below the base are two titles: A H & C^{o} and 1889 GD Diplôme d'Honneur Alfred Hache & CE (1889 was the year the Alfred Hache factory won the gold medal at the Paris exhibition, together with the Manufacture nationale de Sèvres). This set also features 116 items belonging to the Bộ đồ sứ Đại Nam (Đại Nam porcelains) which feature the national coat of arms of the Nguyễn dynasty, the highlight of these porcelain ware is that in the middle of each object the coat of arms is prominently displayed with the Hán characters 大南 (Đại Nam) as a representative image of the nation to use in the international stage. During the Thành Thái period the Đại Nam porcelains were used to entertain foreign diplomats and delegations. In 1910, during the Duy Tân period, the Tả Vu of the Cần Chánh Palace (Đại Nội) was transformed into a European-style reception room to welcome European delegations, this is also the space for displaying many diplomatic gifts of the French government and Chinese delegations.

As coats of arms were considered national symbols representing the sovereignty of a country in the international arena the usage of this "Đại Nam coat of arms" was considered to be a radical expression of nationalism while the country was under French domination.

On 14 August 1922, during his visit to France, the Khải Định Emperor a set of "Chinese-style" tea set from the Manufacture nationale de Sèvres in Paris. This set of tableware is today known as the Khải Định porcelains and depict a different version of the coat of arms of the Nguyễn dynasty, featuring a grey scroll and a silver sword. This set is decorated with blue enamel and was used in the An Định Palace.

In the 1941 book Hymnes et pavillons d'Indochine published by the Government-General of French Indochina, which features the flags, national anthems, and other symbols of its constituent countries, a completely golden version of the coat of arms (attributed to the Empire of Annam) is shown without any Hán characters on the scroll. The book also features an alternative coat of arms showing a five-clawed dragon positioned affronté, both heraldic symbols are listed in the book as the Armoiries de l'Annam (coats of arms of Annam).

=== After 1945 ===
After the abolition of the Nguyễn dynasty the coat of arms and its variants continued to be used by members of the House of Nguyễn Phúc; for example, the Bảo Đại version was used on envelopes sent by Chief of State Bảo Đại and crown prince Nguyễn Phúc Bảo Long during the State of Vietnam period. In 1980 former emperor Bảo Đại used his personal variant as the cover of his autobiographic work S.M. Bao Daï, Le Dragon d'Annam published by Plon.

The coat of arms of the Nguyễn dynasty also appeared on the cover of the book The European ceramics at the Huế Royal Antiques Museum – Đồ gốm sứ Châu Âu tại Bảo tàng cổ vật cung đình Huế about the ceramics found in the Huế Museum of Royal Fine Arts published in 2018.

== Misattribution ==
The exact origins of this tableware has been disputed, as R. de la Susse reported in 1913 that the tableware containing the Huy hiệu An Nam was originally ordered from Paris during the Đồng Khánh period in the 1880s. Antique expert Philippe Trương disputes this claim and states that the reason the French deliberately misattributed the coat of arms was because the Thành Thái Emperor was disposed by the French authorities and to the French attributing the coat of arms to Đồng Khánh, who was more amicable towards the French, would whitewash the history of both the Đại Nam porcelains and the coat of arms. Philippe Trương debunked the earlier claims by stating that because the tableware bear the inscription A H & C^{o} that they could not have been created any earlier than 1903. This was because in 1903 Pierre-Emile Jullien had died leading to Alfred Hache changing the name of the workshop to Alfred Hache & Cie., the products were titled "Alfred Hache" and "A.H. & Cie". After World War I in 1914, the Hache workshop was dissolved.

During the years 1889 and 1900 the Hache workshop was very popular and could compete with the National Sèvres workshop. Besides this, the Hache workshop at the time also had a strong export market, with Hache having been present on the Vietnamese market since around 1850 to 1872. The Huế Royal Antiques Museum also keeps a bowl of sauce with the title "A. Hache & Pepin Lehalleur" (1850–1872) and a large oval plate, titled "Hache, Jullien & Cie" (1885–1903). But the main reason that the Nguyễn dynasty court ordered from the Hache workshop was because they made blue and gold enamel tableware for the French Residency in Huế. Therefore, the Thành Thái Emperor had ordered Đại Nam porcelains at Alfred Hache factory.

== Gallery ==
=== Variants ===
==== Personal coats of arms of emperors ====
The personal coat of arms of the Khải Định Emperor.

The personal coat of arms of the Bảo Đại Emperor.

==== Military divisions ====
Insignia of the Imperial Guards.

Insignia of the Imperial Guards, with red characters.

=== Uses of the coat of arms and its variants ===
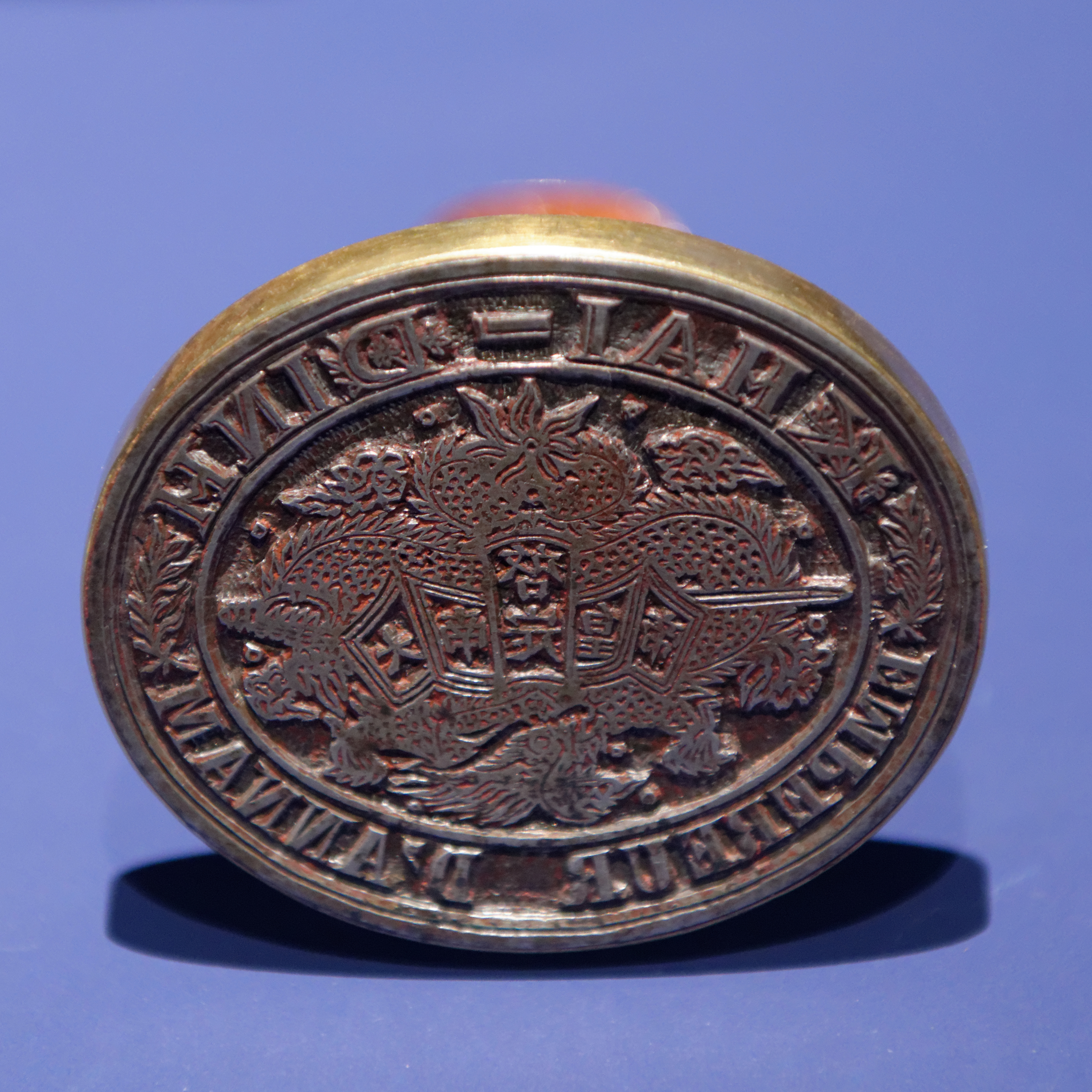
Khải Định's personal coat of arms on his French-style seal.

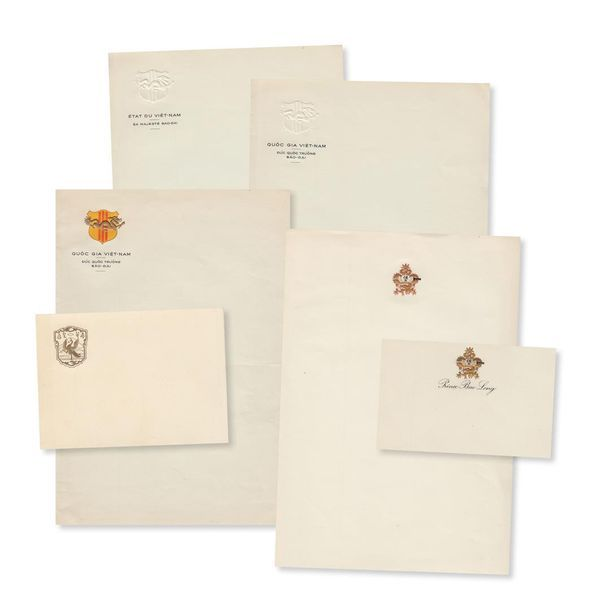
Official envelopes of the government of H.M. Bảo Đại during the State of Vietnam period.

== Other coats of arms ==
Historical heraldry used during the Nguyễn dynasty period
Symbol	Use	Duration	Description
Cities
	Coat of arms of Hanoi, Tonkin.	1888—1954	
	Coat of arms of Hải Phòng, Tonkin.	1888—1954	
	Coat of arms of Hải Dương, Tonkin.		
	Coat of arms of Nam Định, Tonkin.		
	Coat of arms of Đà Lạt, Annam.	1930—1975	Or, Lang Biang mountains Gules, on a chief Gules, a tiger passant Proper. Supporters dexter a naked aboriginal Koho woman Proper, sinister an aboriginal Koho man Proper holding his spear Sable. Motto: DAT ALIIS LÆTITIAM ALIIS TEMPERIEM.
Nobility and personal coats of arms
	Coat of arms of the baron of An Phước.		A seal with the seal script characters "An Phước" (安福), written right-to-left, with a French-style baronial coronet.
	Personal coat of arms of empress Nam Phương.		A blazon containing a phượng hoàng standing (rampant) in front of a mountain with the Chinese characters "Nam Phương hoàng hậu" (南芳皇后) written right-to-left above the bird.

== See also ==
- Emblem of Vietnam
- Flags of the Nguyễn dynasty's administrative units
- Seals of the Nguyễn dynasty

== Sources ==
- Hội đồng trị sự Nguyễn Phúc Tộc (1995), Nguyễn Phúc Tộc thế phả, NXB. Thuận Hoả Huế.
- Trần Đức Anh Sơn (June 2018). Đồ Sứ Ký Kiểu Thời Nguyễn (Song Ngữ) (in English and Vietnamese). NXBTH TPHCM.
