= Flags of the Nguyễn dynasty's administrative units =

Flags of the Nguyễn dynasty's administrative units were used since about 1868 to 1885, with 1:1 ratio.

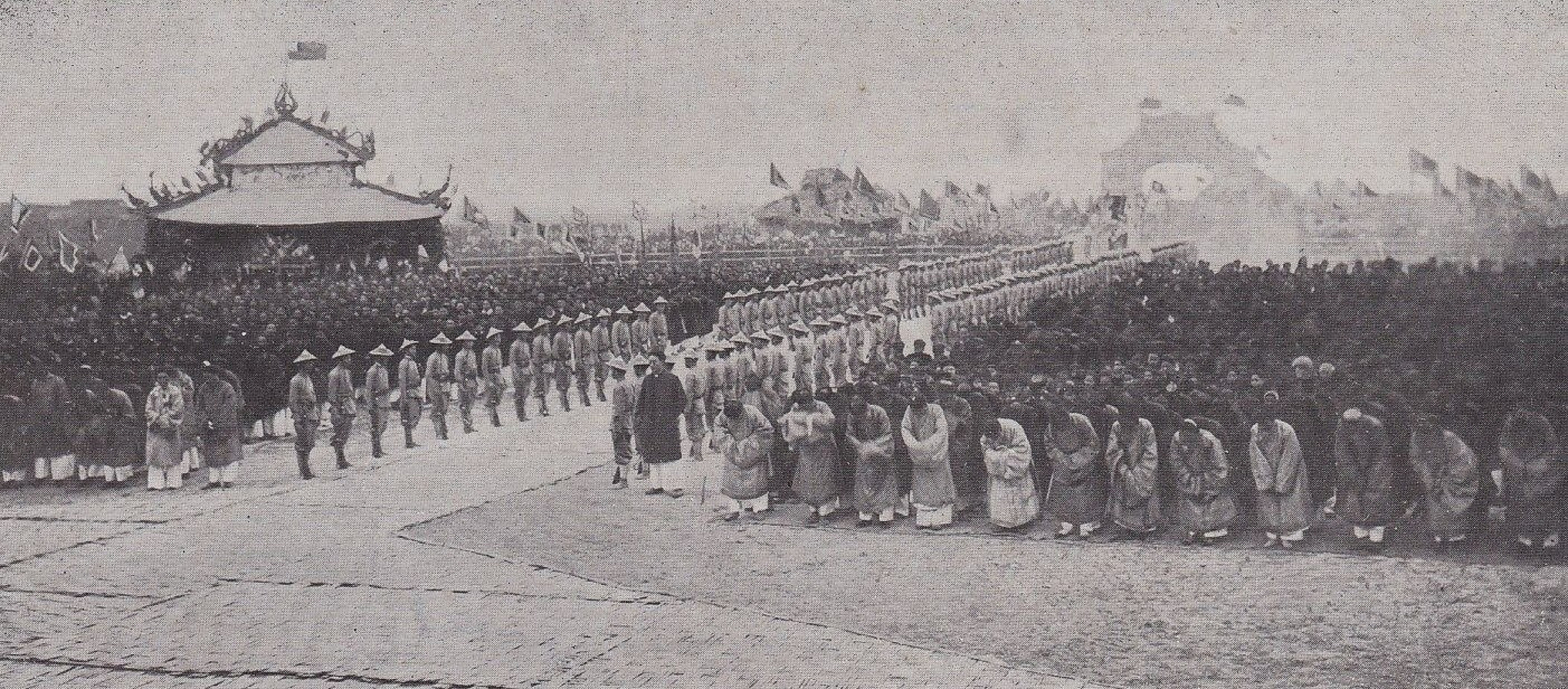
Emperor Bảo Đại at the Tombs of the Ancestors of the Dynasty at Thanh-Hóa, 4 November 1932. Flags can be seen in the background.

== Northern Region (北圻之省) ==
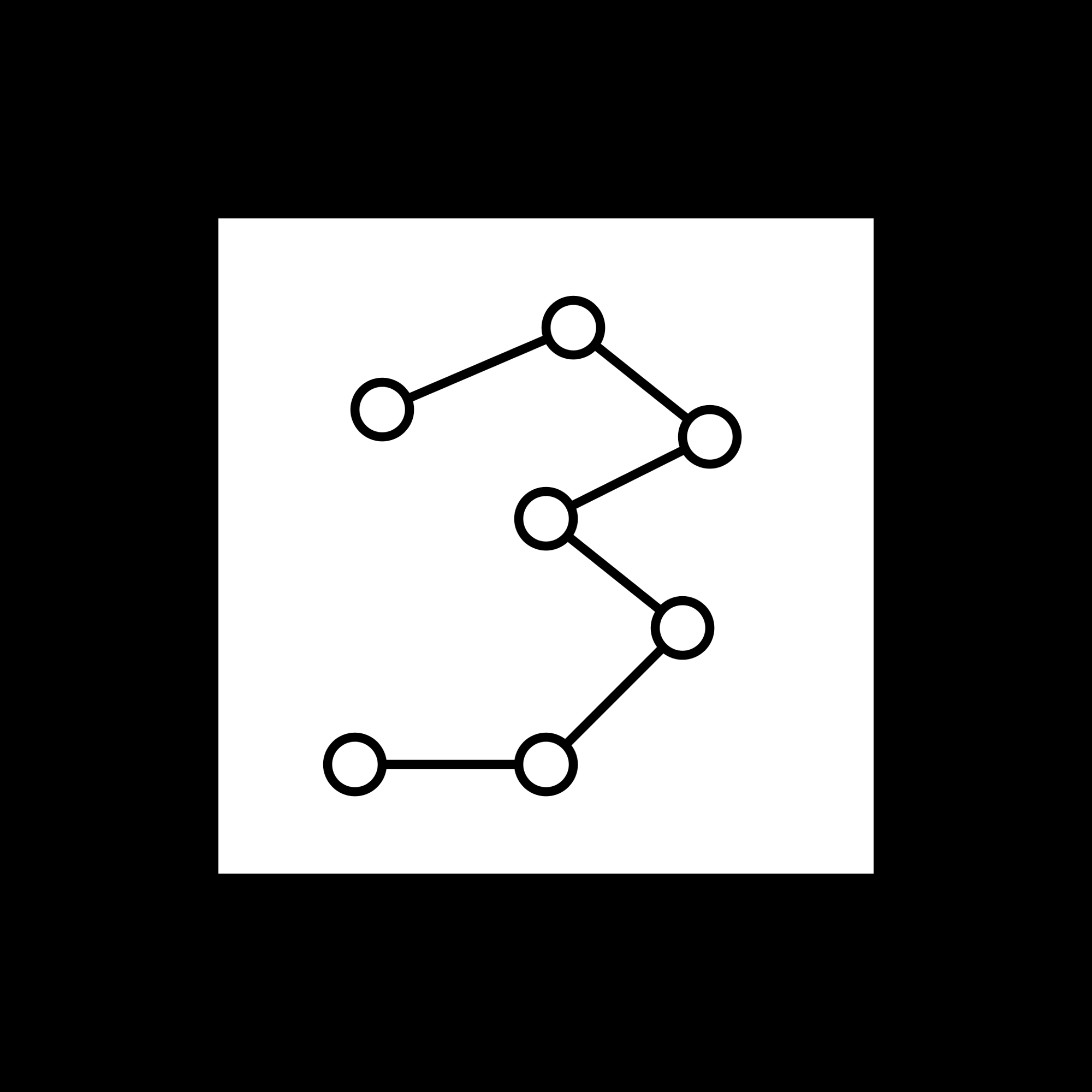
Hà Nội (Hà Nội tỉnh, 河內省)

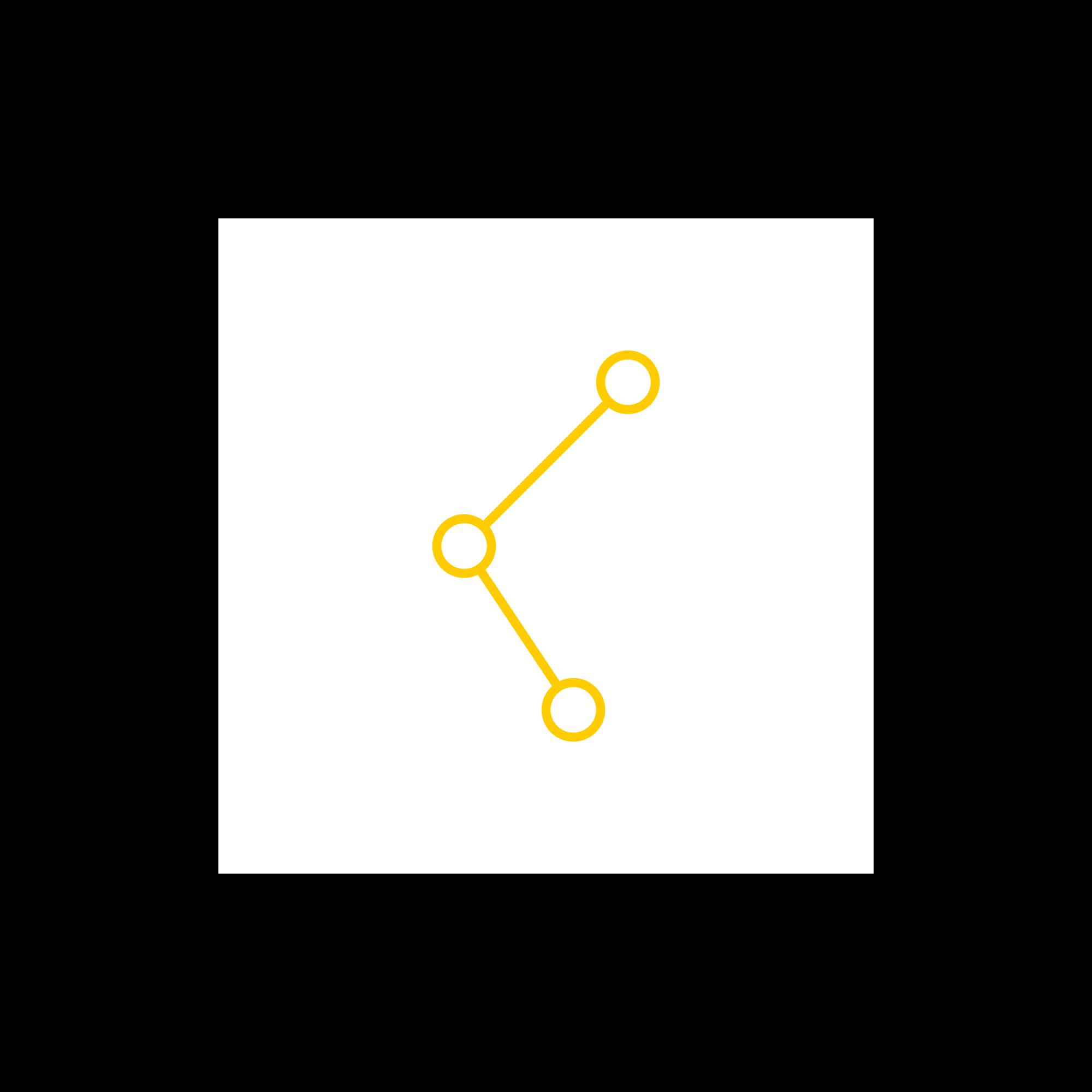
Sơn Tây (Sơn Tây tỉnh, 山西省)

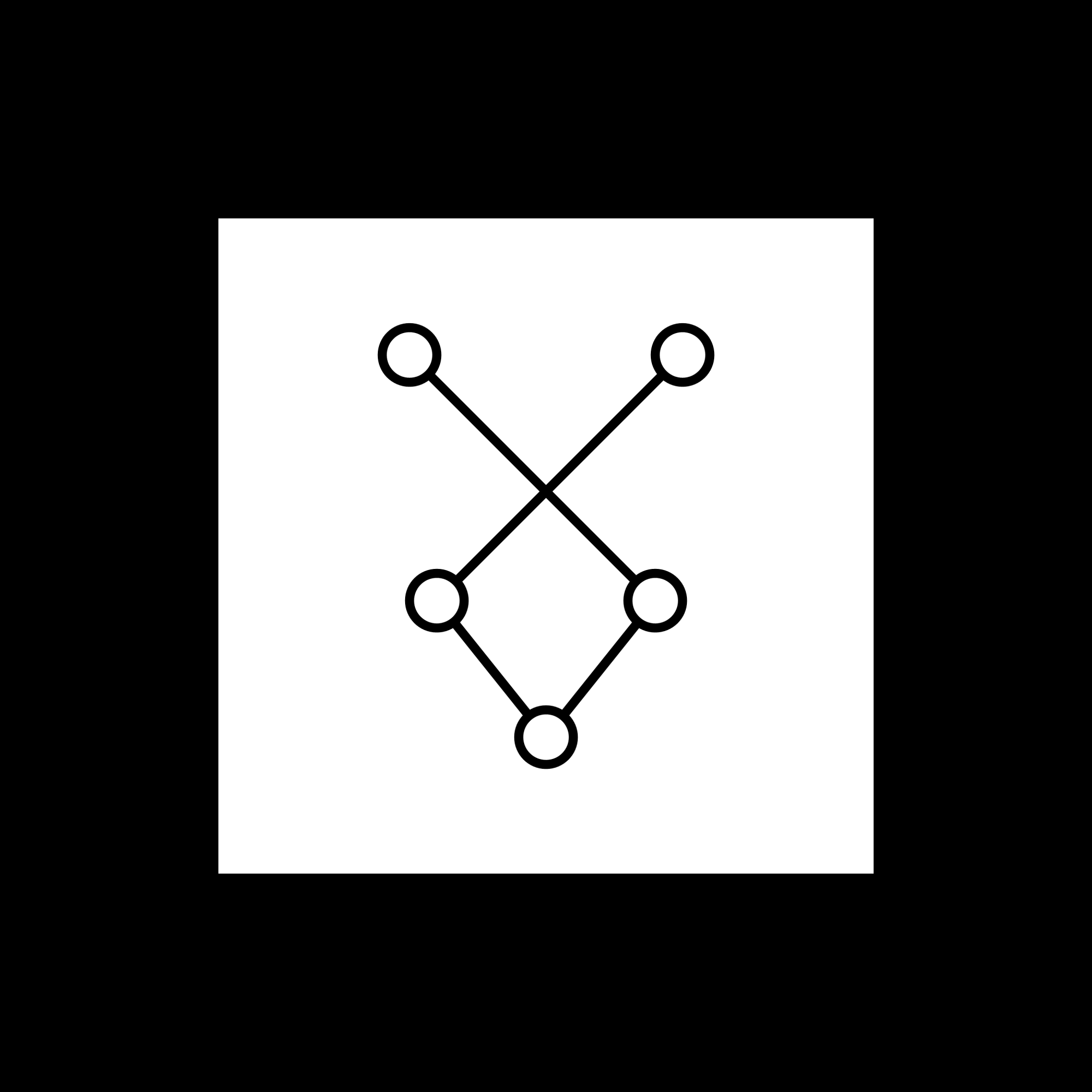
Bắc Ninh (Bắc Ninh tỉnh, 北寧省)

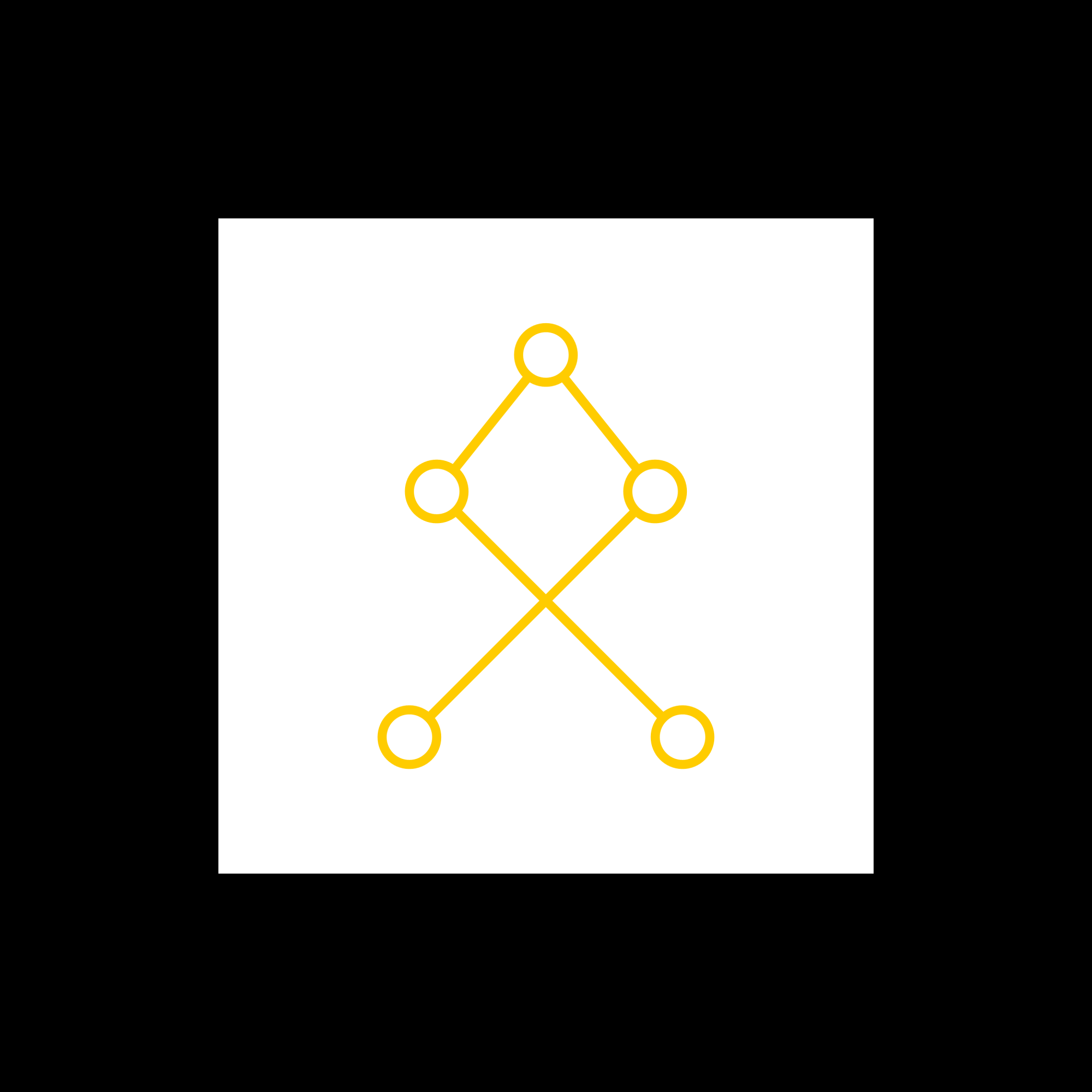
Lạng Sơn (Lạng Sơn tỉnh, 諒山省)

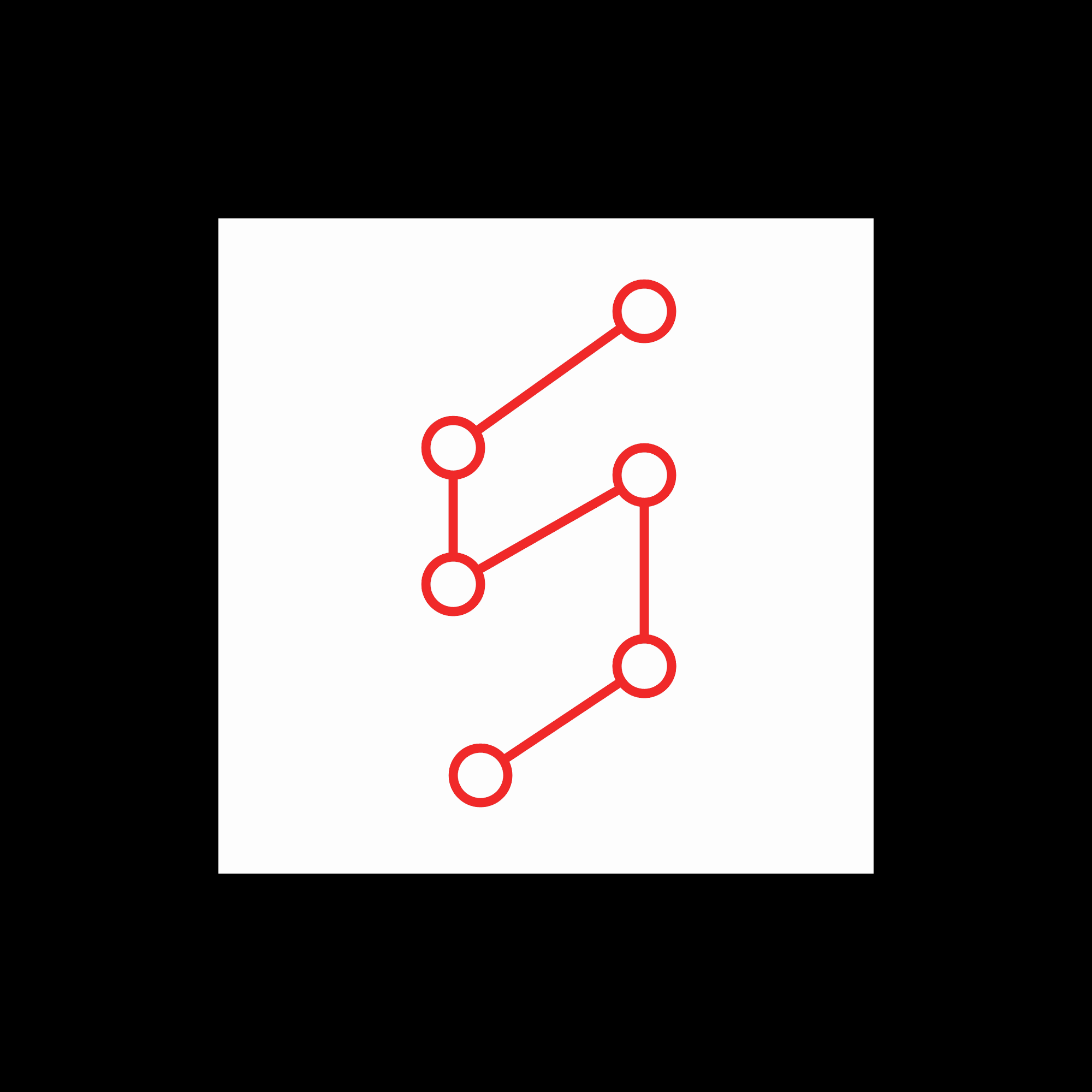
Nam Định (Nam Định tỉnh, 南定省)

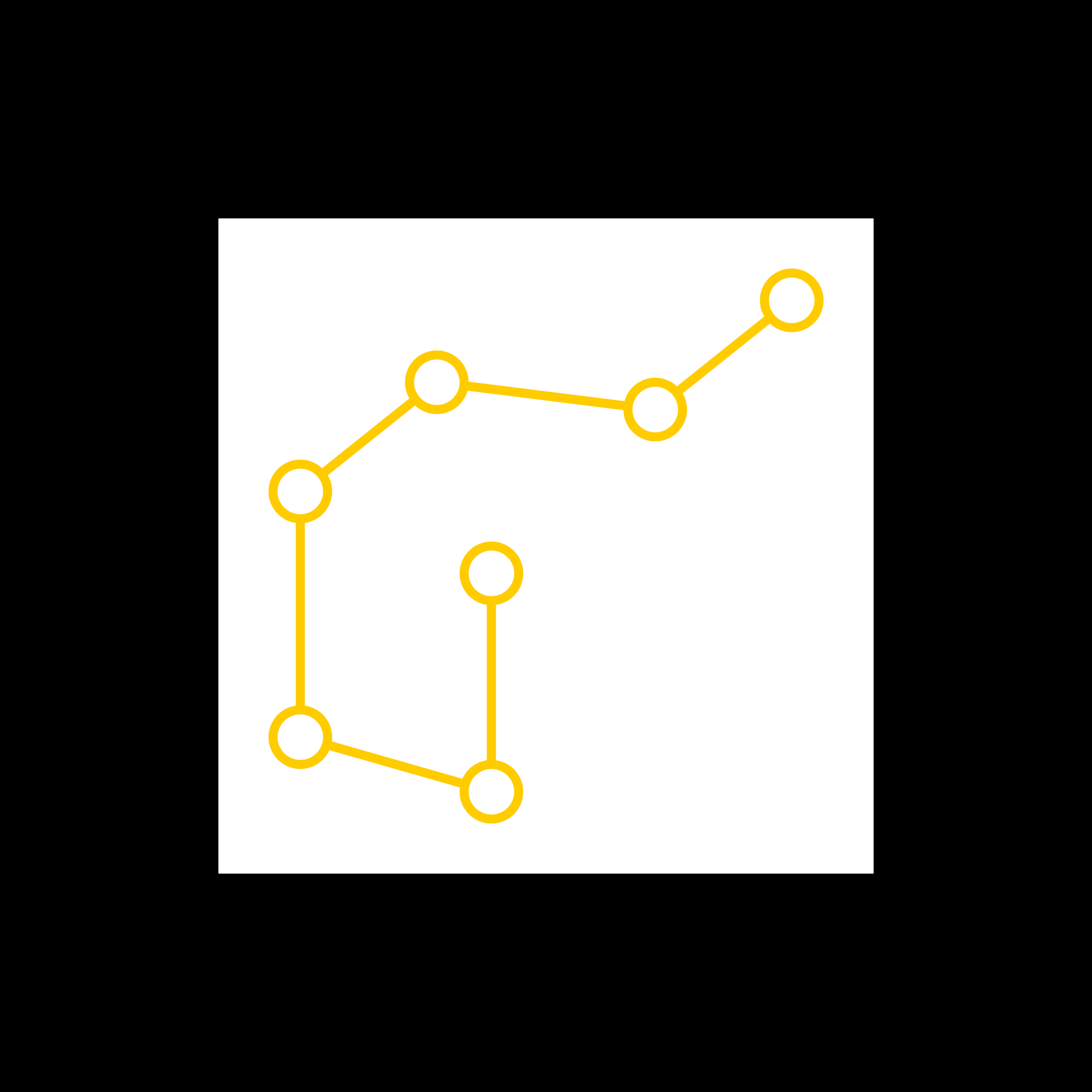
Hải Dương (Hải Dương tỉnh, 海陽省)

== Right Region (右圻之省) ==
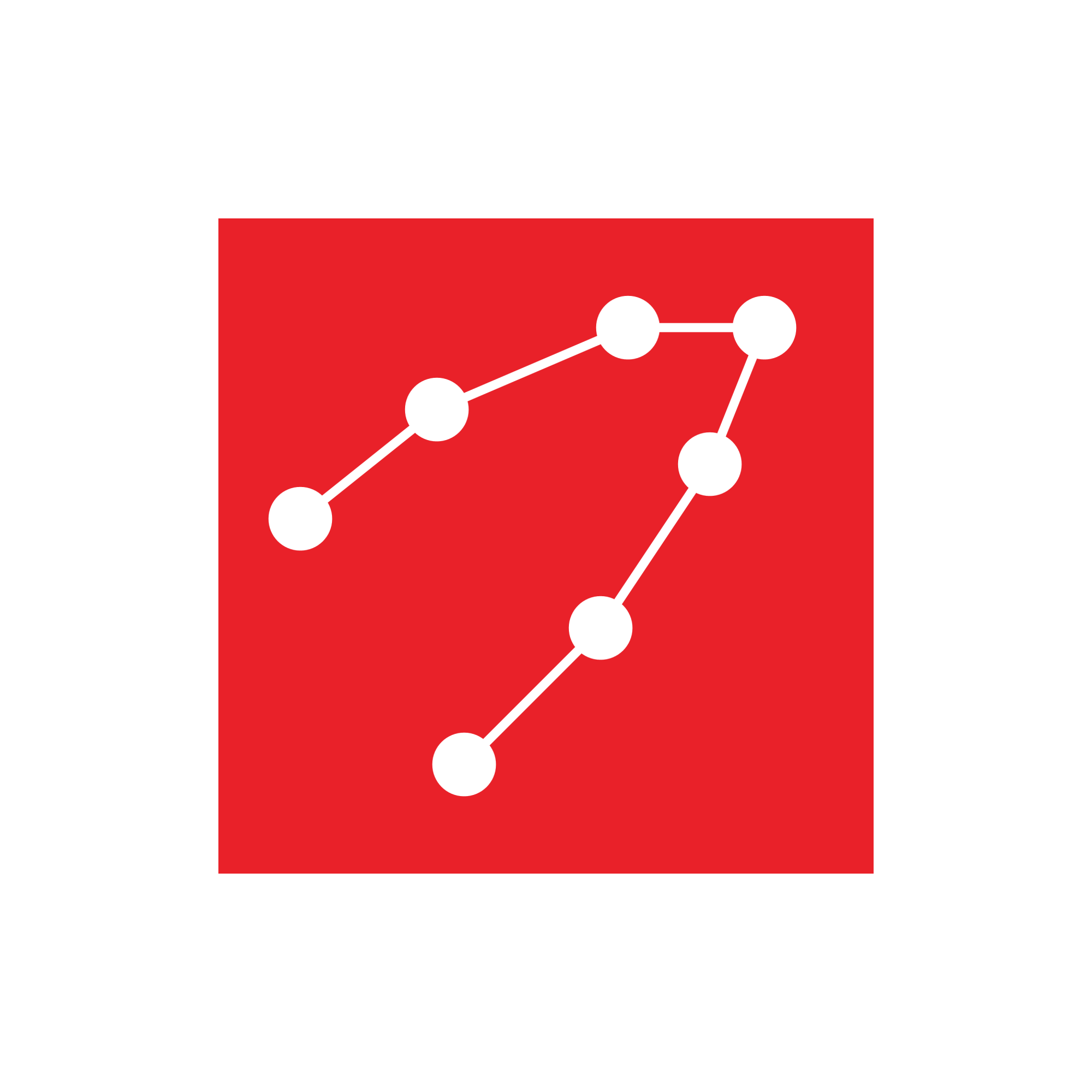
Thanh Hóa (Thanh Hóa tỉnh, 清化省)

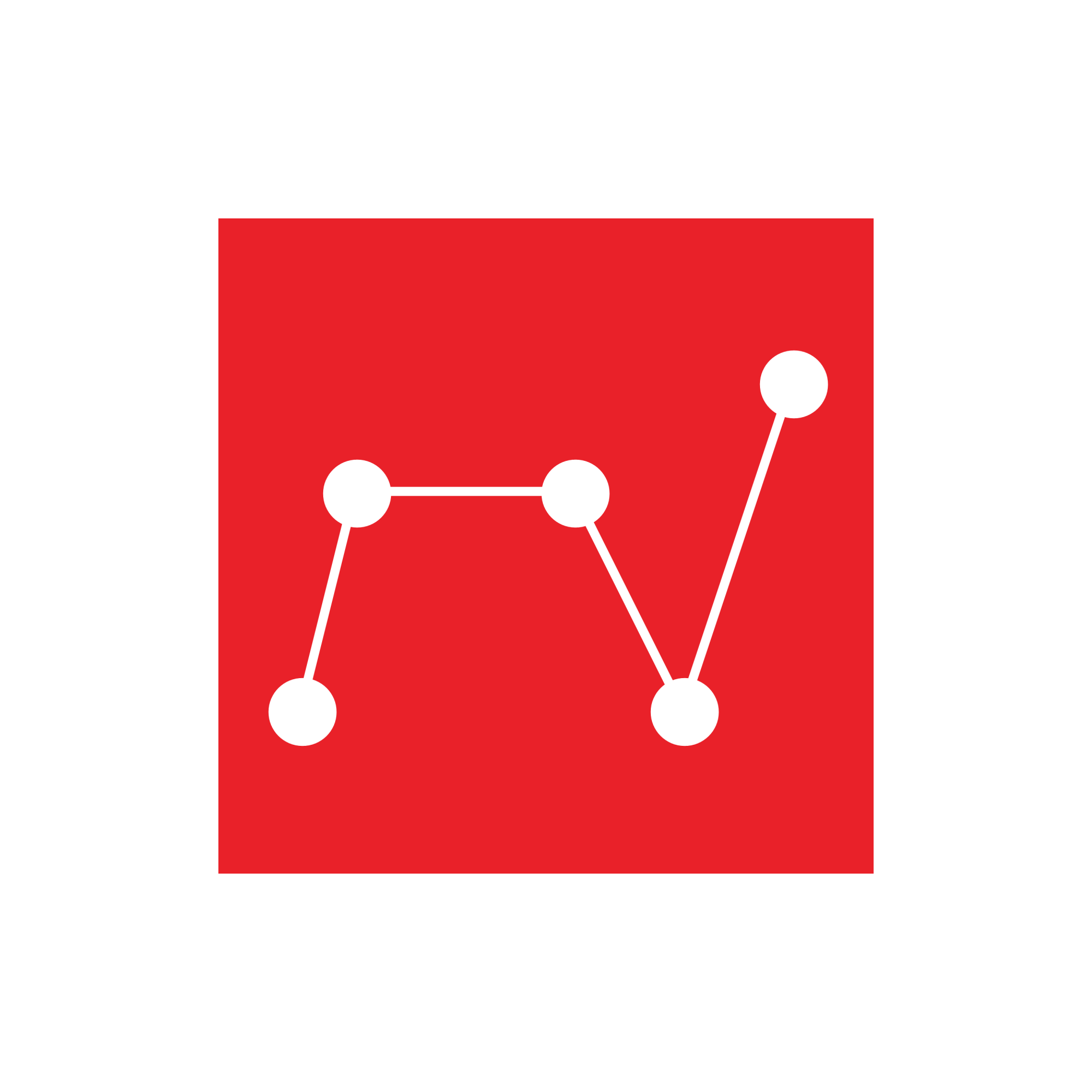
Nghệ An (Nghệ An tỉnh, 乂安省)

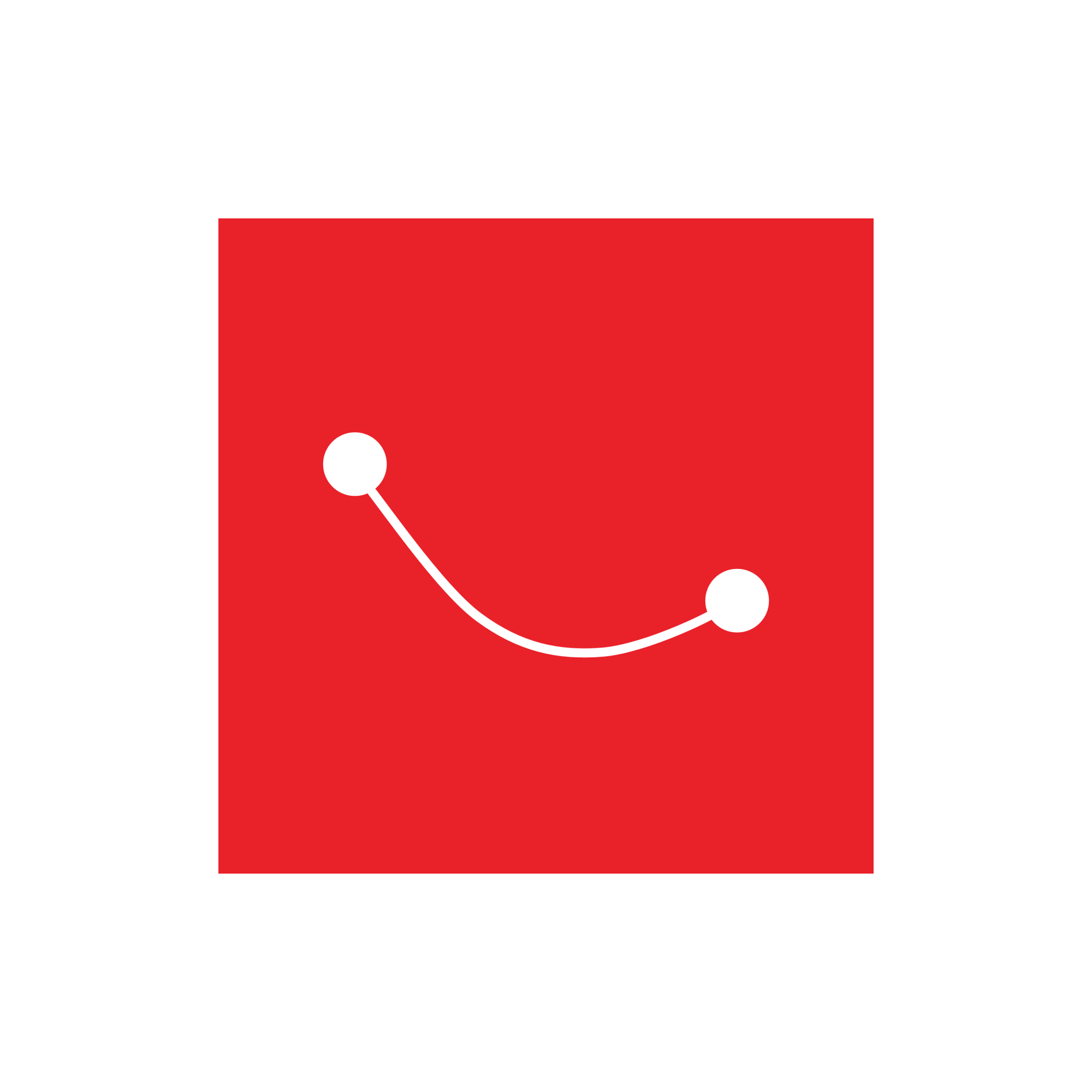
Hà Tĩnh (Hà Tĩnh tỉnh, 河靜省)

== Straight Region (直圻之省) ==
Thừa Thiên (Thừa Thiên phủ, 承天府)

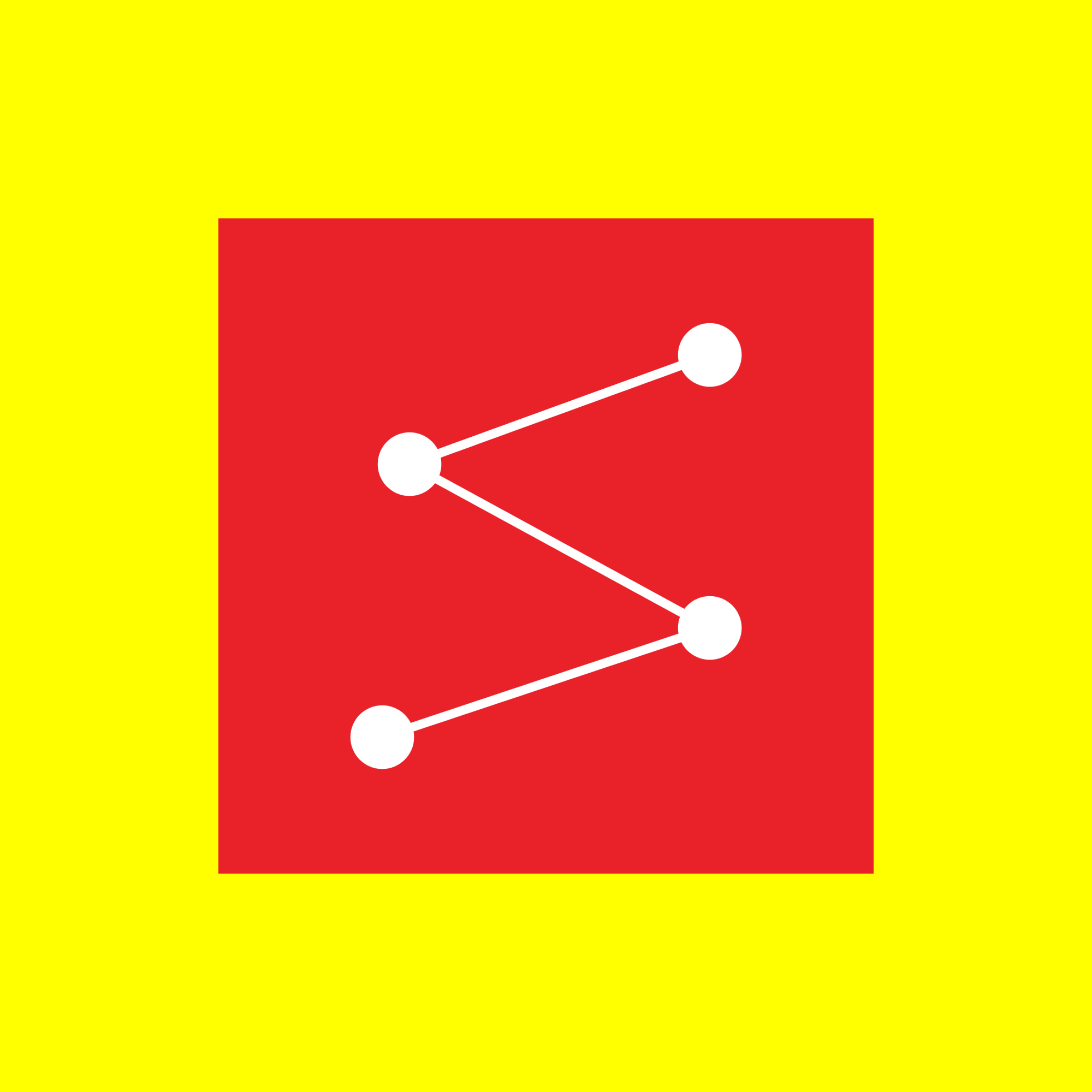
Quảng Bình (Quảng Bình tỉnh, 廣平省)

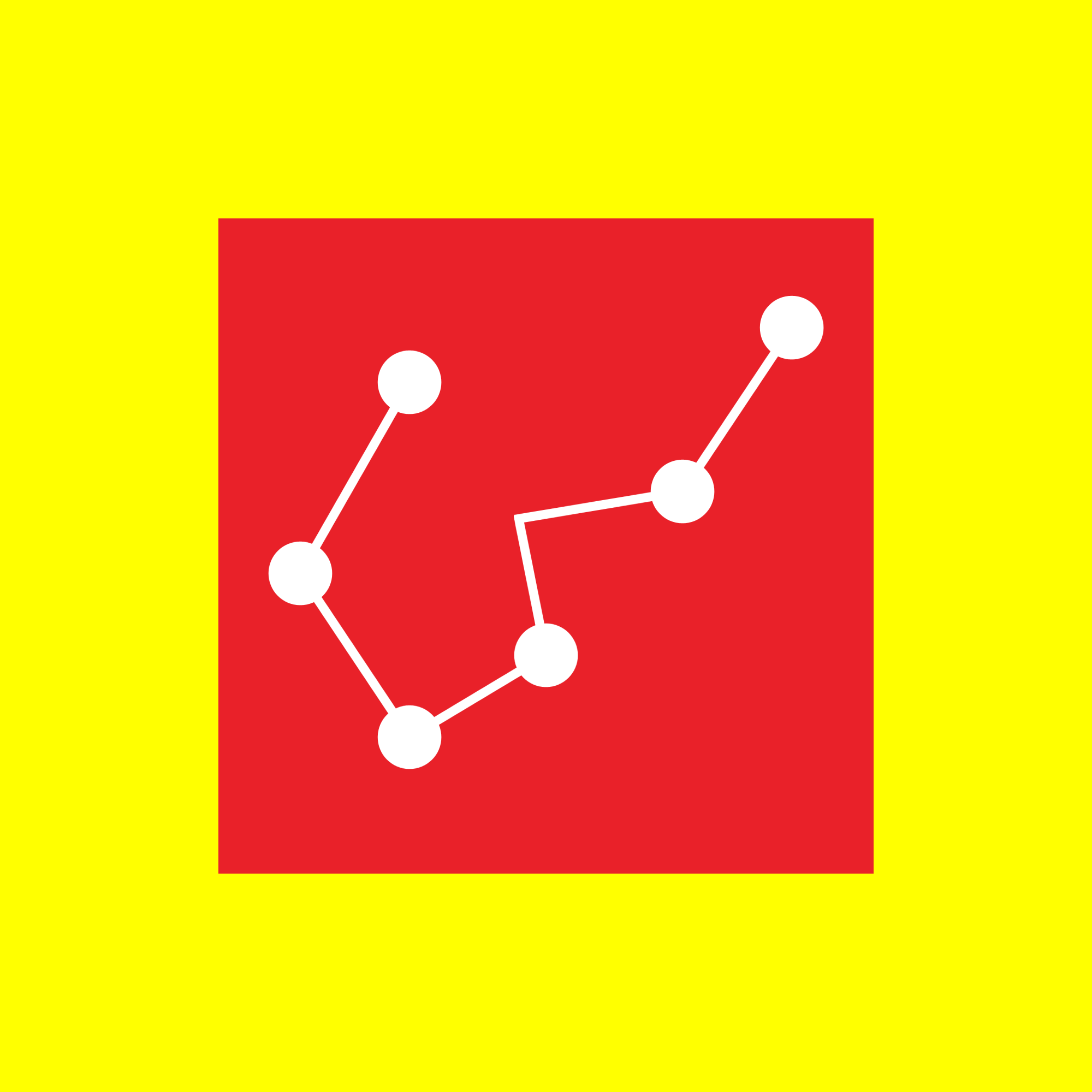
Quảng Trị (Quảng Trị tỉnh, 廣治省)

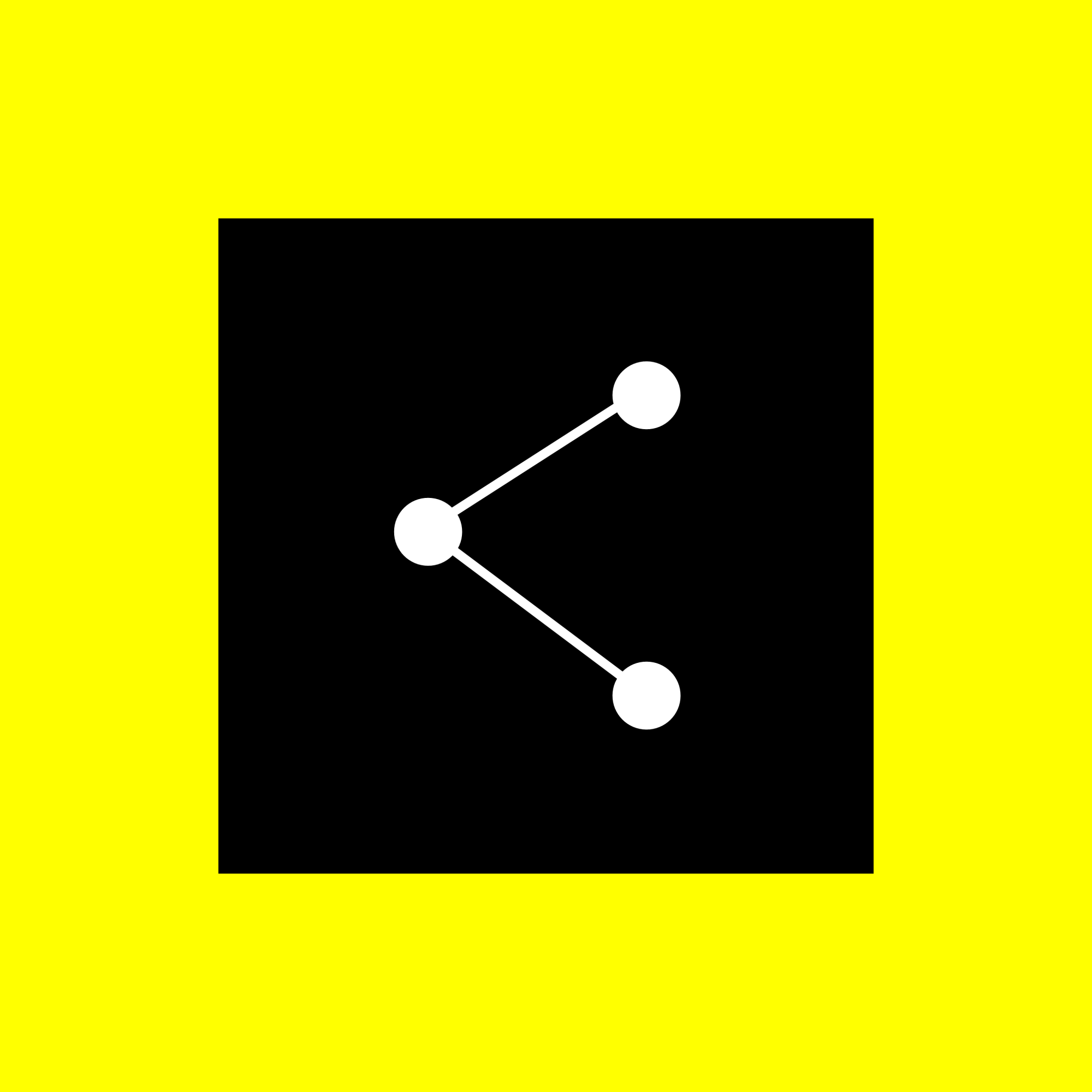
Quảng Nam (Quảng Nam tỉnh, 廣南省)

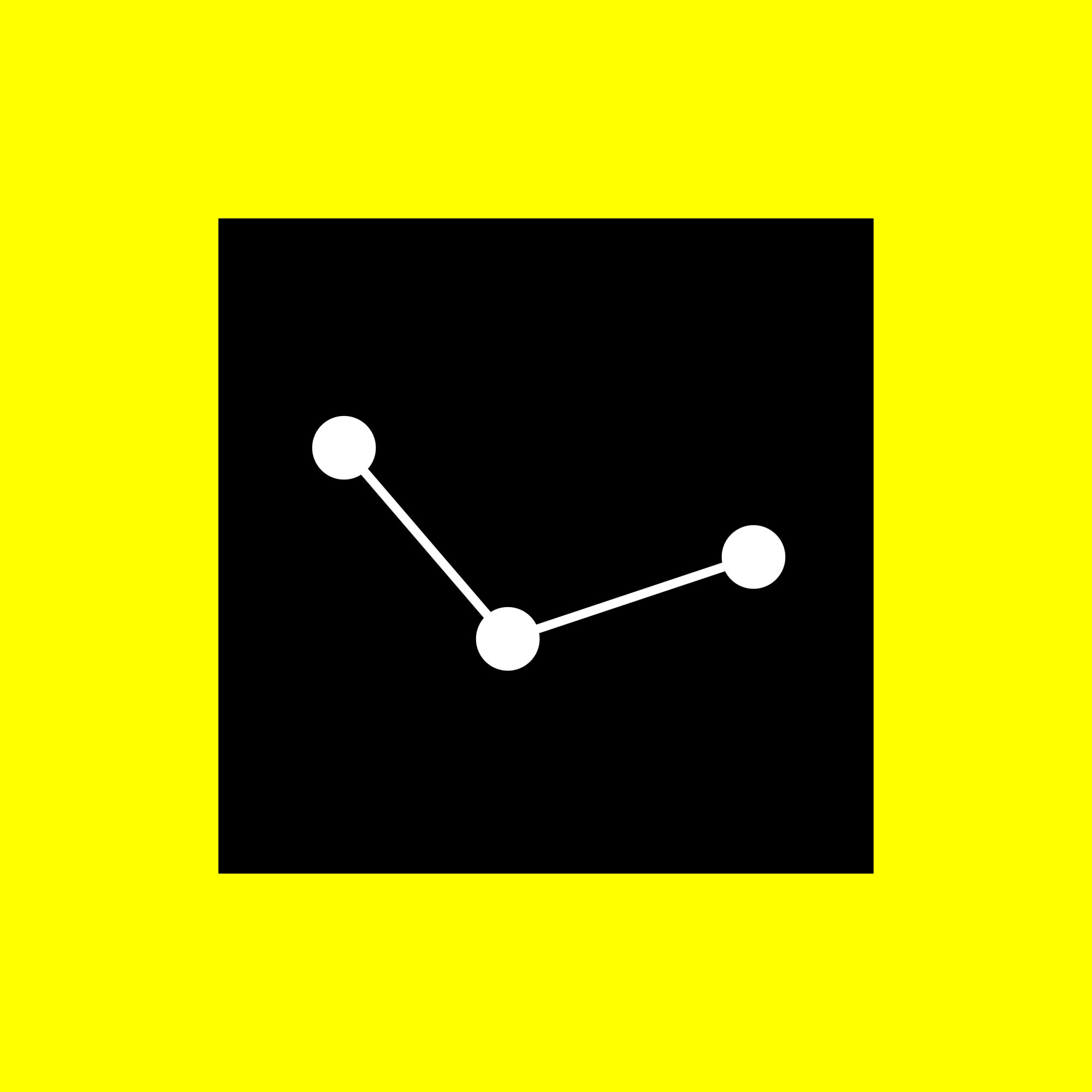
Quảng Ngãi (Quảng Ngãi tỉnh, 廣義省)

== Left Region (左圻之省) ==
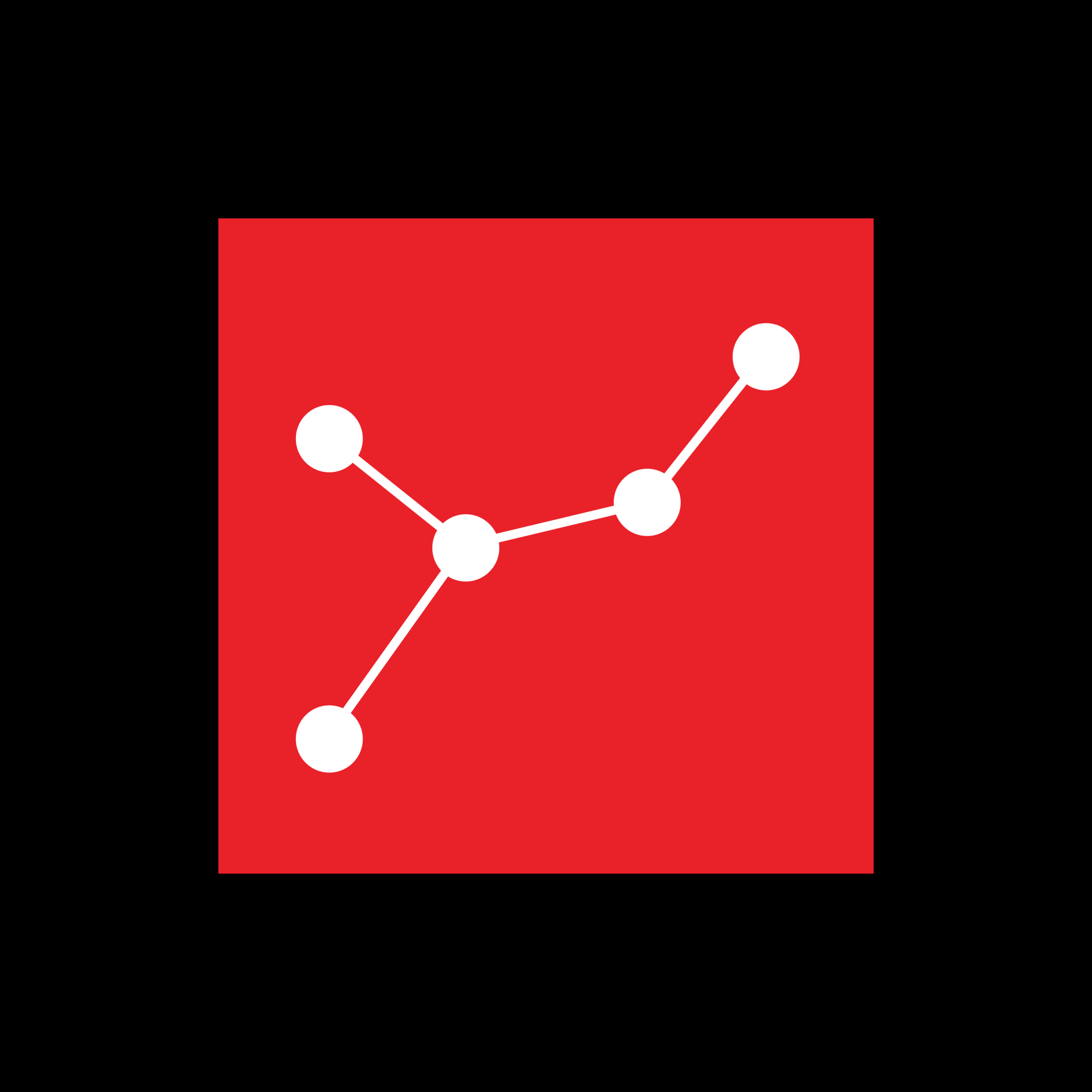
Bình Định (Bình Định tỉnh, 平定省)

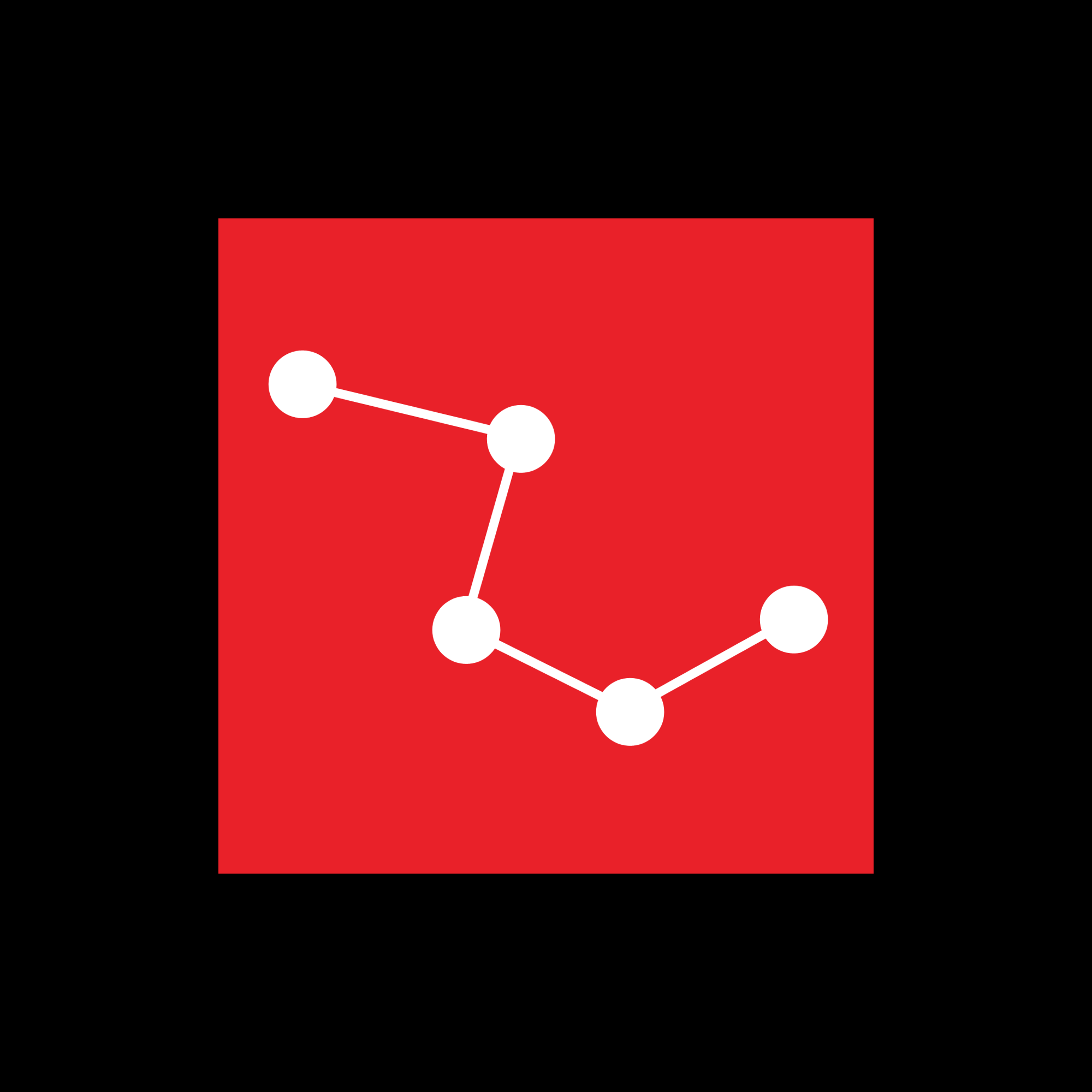
Phú Yên (Phú Yên tỉnh, 富安省)

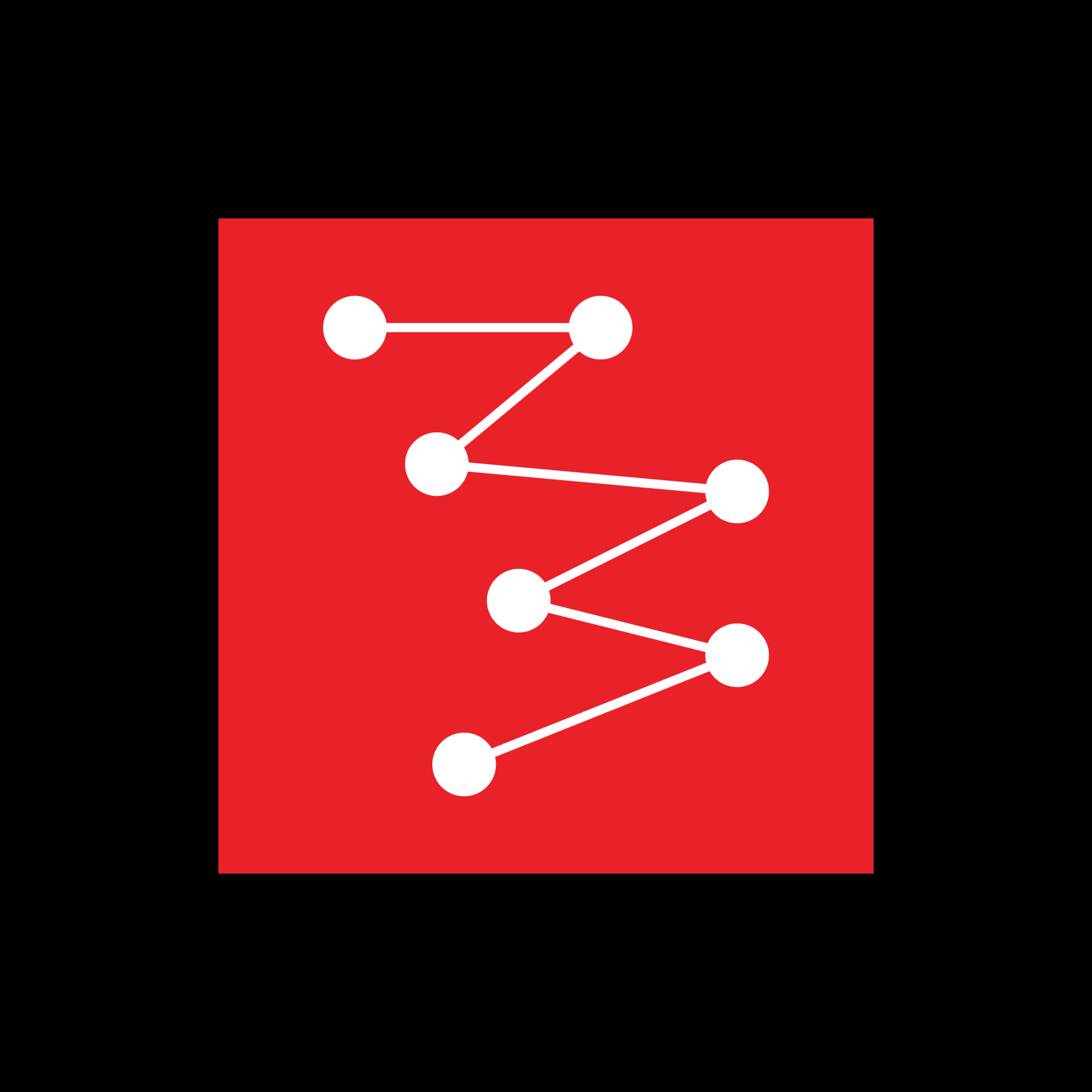
Khánh Hòa (Khánh Hòa tỉnh, 慶和省)

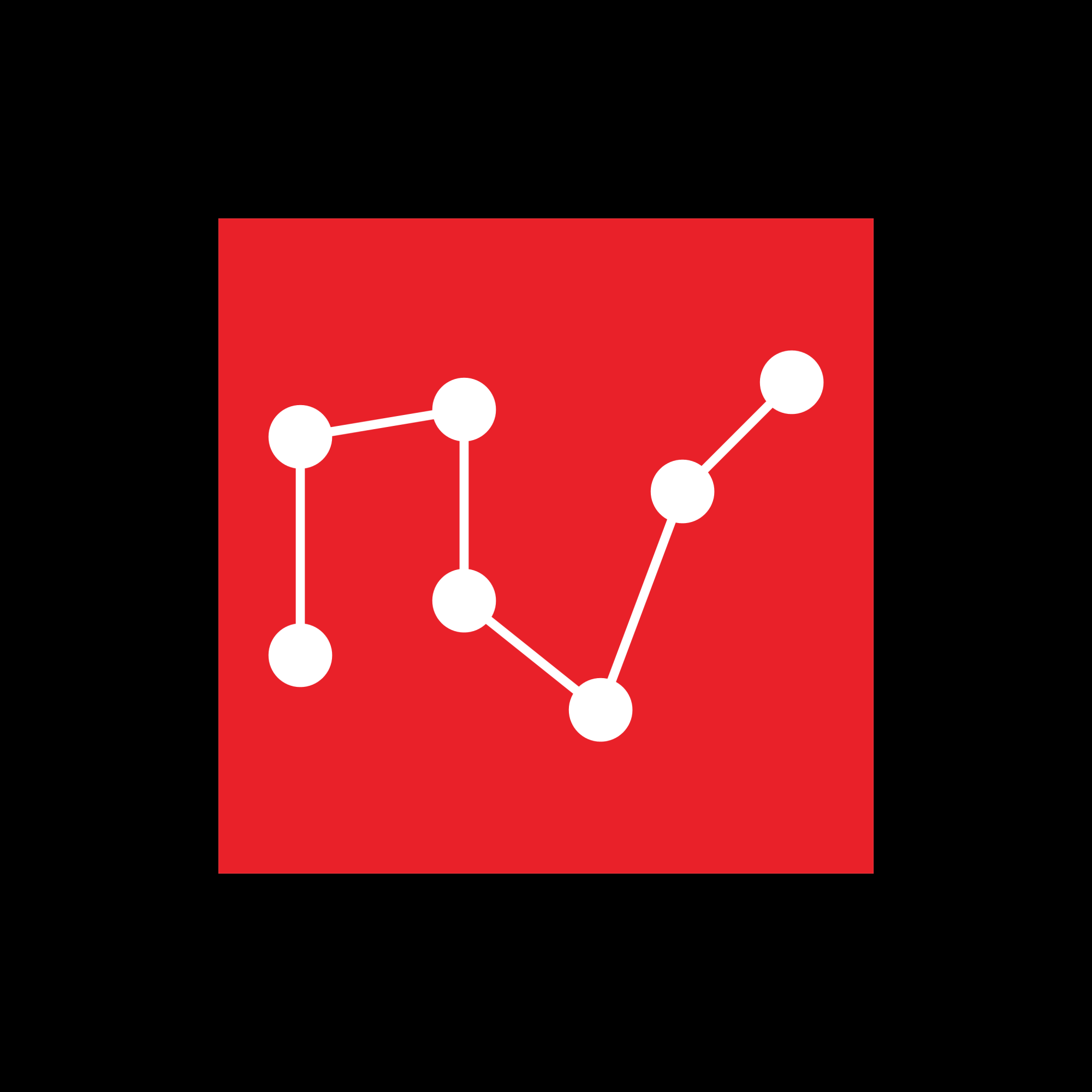
Bình Thuận (Bình Thuận tỉnh, 平順省)

== See also ==
- Provinces of Vietnam
- Flags of the subjects of Vietnam
- List of flags of Vietnam

== Sources ==
- Peter Truhart, Regents of Nations, K.G Saur Münich, 1984–1988 ISBN 359810491X, Art. «Vietnamese Dynasties/Vietnamesische Dynastien», pp. 1786–1790.
- The star icon in Vietnamese consciousness (TTXVA.NET).
- Hervé Calvarin, Olivier Corre: L'Indochine. Étude d'Histoire vexillologique. In: Franciae Vexilla. (Bulletin de la Société Française de Vexillologie) Numéro spécial 2005, 20e anniversaire de la Société Française de Vexillologie-SFV, ISSN 1270-0096, S. 89-126; 147-162. (in French).
